= List of compositions by Jean Sibelius =

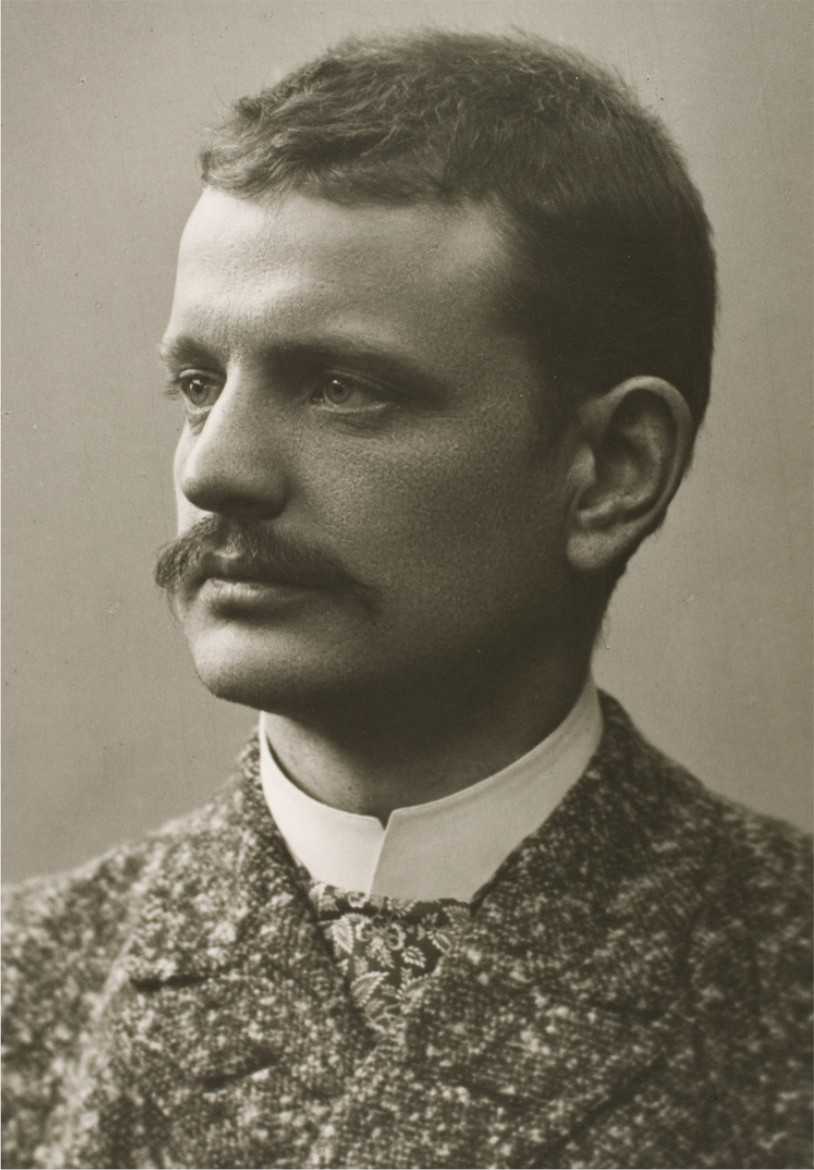
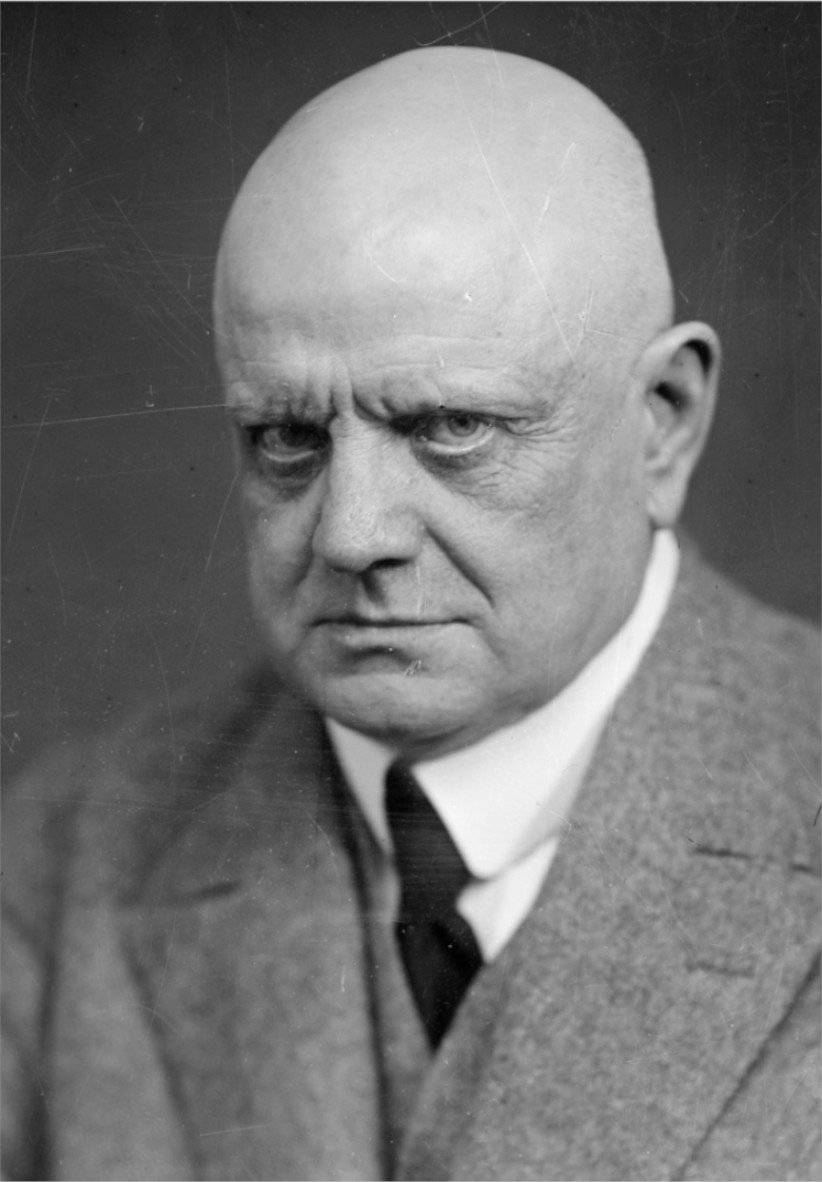
Sibelius at the time of Kullervo (left, 1892) and Tapiola (right, 1926), two celebrated works that bookended his career

The Finnish composer Jean Sibelius (1865–1957) wrote over 550 original works during his eight-decade artistic career. This began around 1875 with a short miniature for violin and cello called Water Droplets (Vattendroppar), and ended a few months before his death at age 91 with the orchestration of two earlier songs, "Kom nu hit, död" ("Come Away, Death") and "Kullervon valitus" ("Kullervo's Lament", excerpted from Movement III of Kullervo).

However, the 1890s to the 1920s represent the key decades of Sibelius's production. After 1926's Tapiola, Sibelius completed no new works of significance, although he infamously labored until the late-1930s or the early-1940s on his Eighth Symphony, which he never completed and probably destroyed c. 1944. This thirty-year creative drought—commonly referred to as the "Silence of Järvenpää", in reference to the sub-region of Helsinki in which the composer and his wife, Aino, resided—occurred at the height of his international and domestic celebrity.

Today, Sibelius is remembered principally as a composer for orchestra: particularly celebrated are his symphonies, tone poems, and lone concerto, although he produced viable works in all major genres of classical music. While his orchestral works meant the most to him, Sibelius refused to dismiss his miniatures (piano pieces, songs, etc.) as insignificant, seeing them instead as "represent[ative of] his innermost self".

== Navigating Sibelius's oeuvre ==
Sibelius's Opp. 1–116
(disaggregated) by category
1. Orchestral works (Note: The opus numbers for orchestral works are: Opp. 6 (one), 7 (one; choral symphony aggregated), 9 (one), 10 (one), 11 (one; suite aggregated), 14 (one), 15 (two; tone poem and melodrama), 16 (one), 19 (one), 22 (one; suite aggregated), 25 (one; suite aggregated), 26 (one), 27 (one; incidental music aggregated), 28 (one), 29 (one), 30 (one), 31 (three), 32 (one), 33 (one), 39 (one), 42 (one), 43 (one), 44 (two), 45 (two), 46 (one; suite aggregated), 47 (one), 48 (one), 49 (one), 51 (one; suite aggregated), 52 (one), 53 (one), 54 (one; suite aggregated), 55 (one), 59 (one), 62 (two), 63 (one), 64 (one), 66 (one; suite aggregated), 69 (two), 70 (one), 71 (one; through-composed score aggregated), 73 (one), 77 (two), 82 (one), 83 (one; through-composed score aggregated), 87 (two), 89 (four), 91 (two), 92 (one), 93 (one), 95 (one), 96 (three), 98 (one; two suites aggregated), 100 (one; suite aggregated), 104 (one), 105 (one), 109 (three; two suites aggregated and a prelude), 110 (one), and 112 (one). Finally, to avoid double counting opus numbers, this count excludes two orchestral works Sibelius subsequently arranged from Opp. 4 (one) and 5 (one).) (23.0%)
2. Chamber works (Note: The opus numbers for chamber works are: Opp. 2 (two pieces), 4 (one), 8 (one; incidental music aggregated), 20 (one), 56 (one), 78 (four), 79 (six), 80 (one), 81 (five), 102 (one), 106 (five), 115 (four), and 116 (three). Finally, to avoid double counting opus numbers, this count excludes a duo for violin and piano that Sibelius subsequently arranged from Op. 71.) (10.0%)
3. Solo instrument (Note: The opus numbers for solo piano are: Opp. 5 (six pieces), 12 (one), 24 (ten), 34 (ten), 40 (ten), 41 (one; suite aggregated), 58 (ten), 67 (three), 68 (two), 74 (four), 75 (five), 76 (thirteen), 85 (five), 94 (six), 97 (six), 99 (eight), 101 (five), 103, (five), and 114 (five). Finally, to avoid double counting opus numbers, this count excludes the two piano pieces Sibelius subsequently arranged from Op. 71. Only one opus number, 111, includes works for organ (two).) (34.0%)
4. Songs (Note: The opus numbers for the songs are: Opp. 1 (five songs), 3 (one), 13 (seven), 17 (seven), 35 (two), 36 (six), 37 (five), 38 (five), 50 (six), 57 (eight), 60 (two), 61 (eight), 72 (six, albeit with two lost), 86 (six), 88 (six), and 90 (six). This count excludes the following songs from orchestral works Sibelius subsequently transcribed for voice and piano: Opp. 7 (one, from Kullervo), 27 (one, from King Christian II), 33 (one, The Rapids-Rider's Brides), 46 (one, from Pelléas et Mélisande), and 70 (one, Luonnotar).) (25.0%)
5. Choral works (Note: The opus numbers for choral works are: Opp. 18 (six songs), 21 (one), 23 (ten; song cycle disaggregated), 65 (two), 84 (five), 108 (two), and 113 (one; through-composed score, aggregated, that also includes the "Finlandia-hymni" ("Finlandia Hymn") that Sibelius subsequently arranged from Op. 26). Finally, to avoid double counting opus numbers, this count excludes "Nejden andas" ("The Landscape Breathes"), which Sibelius arranged from Op. 30 (one).) (8.00%)

=== Works with and without opus ===
Sibelius's final opus list dates to 1952 and ranges from Opp. 1 to 116, albeit with Op. 107 (Note: Sibelius's final opus list from 1952 did not assign Op. 107 to any composition. However, earlier personal lists indicate that c. 1930 the composer had labeled the Three Introductory Antiphons (Kolme johdantovuorolaulua) for baritone soloist (liturgist), mixed choir (congregation), and organ (1925, JS 110/1–3), as well as "Herran siunaus" ("The Lord's Blessing") for organ and liturgist (1925, JS 95), as Op. 107. The Three Introductory Antiphons were demoted c. 1942, while "Herran siunaus" lost its place c. 1951. Some evidence also exists that Sibelius, after demoting the antiphons, may have considered replacing them with the orchestral song "Onward, Ye Brethren" (from No. 6 of the Op. 113 Masonic Ritual Music).) unassigned and Op. 117 (Note: The Suite for Violin and String Orchestra (1929; JS 185) is sometimes designated as Sibelius's de facto Op. 117, because the composer referred to it as such in a 15 February 1929 letter to Carl Fischer Music. Nevertheless, Fischer's rejection of the Suite led Sibelius to demote the work from his opus list, and his personal catalogue from 1930 listed the Academic March (Promootiomarssi; JS 155, 1919) and the patriotic piece for male choir and piano "Karjalan osa" ("Karelia's Fate"; JS 108, 1930), respectively, as Opp. 117/1 and 117/2. By 1942, Sibelius had again changed his mind, with the orchestrated version of Andante festivo (JS 34b; 1922, arranged 1938) now labeled as Op. 117/a. His final opus list from 1952, however, did not assign Op. 117 to any composition.) holding ambiguous status. Among the 115 active numbers, however, are many collections; disaggregating these multi-work numbers reveals that—counting conservatively—about 342 compositions comprise the list:

- 77 orchestral works, spanning 59 opus numbers
- 35 chamber works, spanning 13 opus numbers
- 117 works for solo instrument (115 for piano, two for organ), spanning 20 opus numbers
- 86 songs, spanning 16 opus numbers
- 27 works for choir, spanning seven opus numbers

When ordered numerically, Sibelius's opus list is an imperfect indicator of his stylistic maturation over time. This is because Sibelius curated the collection according to his ever-changing assessment of his oeuvre (highly self-critical, he became especially ambivalent later in life towards his early period), promoting works to or demoting them from the catalogue and filling the resulting vacancies without a strict regard for compositional chronology. (Note: The 1952 list superseded several earlier personal catalogues, the first of which dates to 1896. For a detailed discussion of Sibelius's various personal catalogues, see Erik Tawaststjerna's Sibelius, Vol. III: 1914–1957, pp. 41–47, as well as Fabian Dahlström's "Die Opuszahlen" in Jean Sibelius: Thematisch-bibliographisches Verzeichnis seiner Werke, which traces Sibelius's cataloguing changes both numerically by opus (pp. 680–687) and alphabetically by name of composition (pp. 687–692).) Among the pieces that at one point held, but later lost, a place on Sibelius's opus list are numerous large-scale works from the 1880s and 1890s, including his only opera, three cantatas, a melodrama, and several multi-movement compositions for chamber ensembles. (Note: Notable demotions include: String Quartet in A minor (JS 183, 1889) → WoO in 1911; Violin Sonata in F major (JS 178, 1889) → WoO in 1897; Piano Quintet in G minor (JS 159, 1890) → WoO in 1915; Overture in E major (JS 145, 1891) → WoO in 1915; Ballet Scene (JS 163, 1891) → WoO in 1914 → promoted in 1915 → WoO again by 1931; Nights of Jealousy (JS 125, 1893) → WoO in 1915 → promoted 1925 → WoO again by 1931; Promotional Cantata of 1894 (JS 105) → WoO by 1911; Coronation Cantata (1896) → WoO by 1910; The Maiden in the Tower (JS 101, 1896) → WoO in 1914; Promotional Cantata of 1897 (JS 106) → WoO in 1905) Sibelius also demoted his first two orchestral compositions, the Overture in E major and Ballet Scene, which were originally intended as movements in a symphony before the composer abandoned the project.

For works without opus, the convention since the late-1990s has been to follow the supplemental JS numbering system of the Finnish musicologist Fabian Dahlström, which he finalized in 2003 with the publication of Jean Sibelius: A Thematic Bibliographic Index of His Works. This list runs from JS 1 to 225 and includes not only compositions Sibelius demoted from his opus list but also those that never held an opus number at any point during his career.

=== Sibelius and his publishers ===
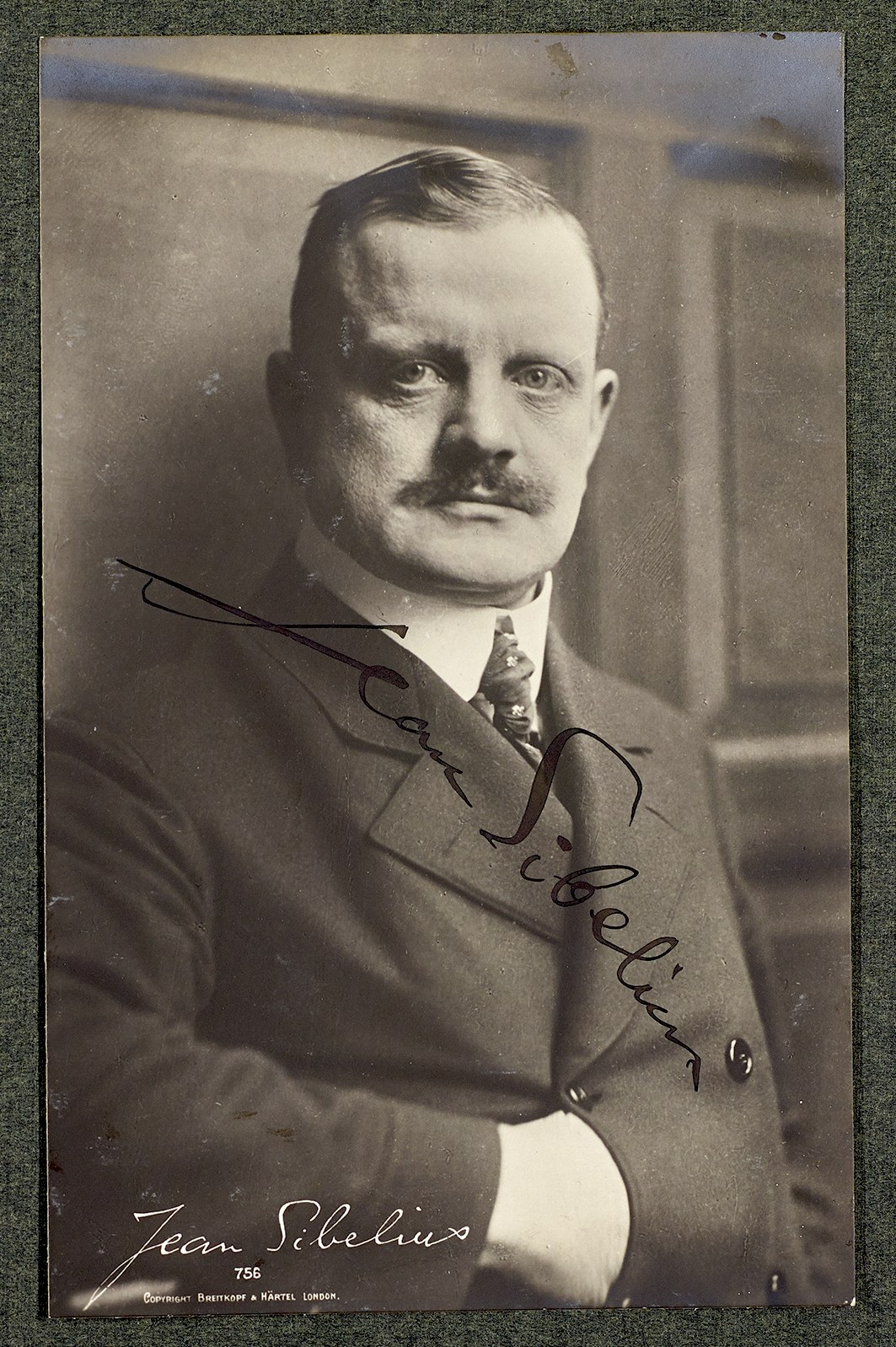
An autographed postcard of Sibelius (c. 1912), printed in Berlin by Breitkopf & Härtel

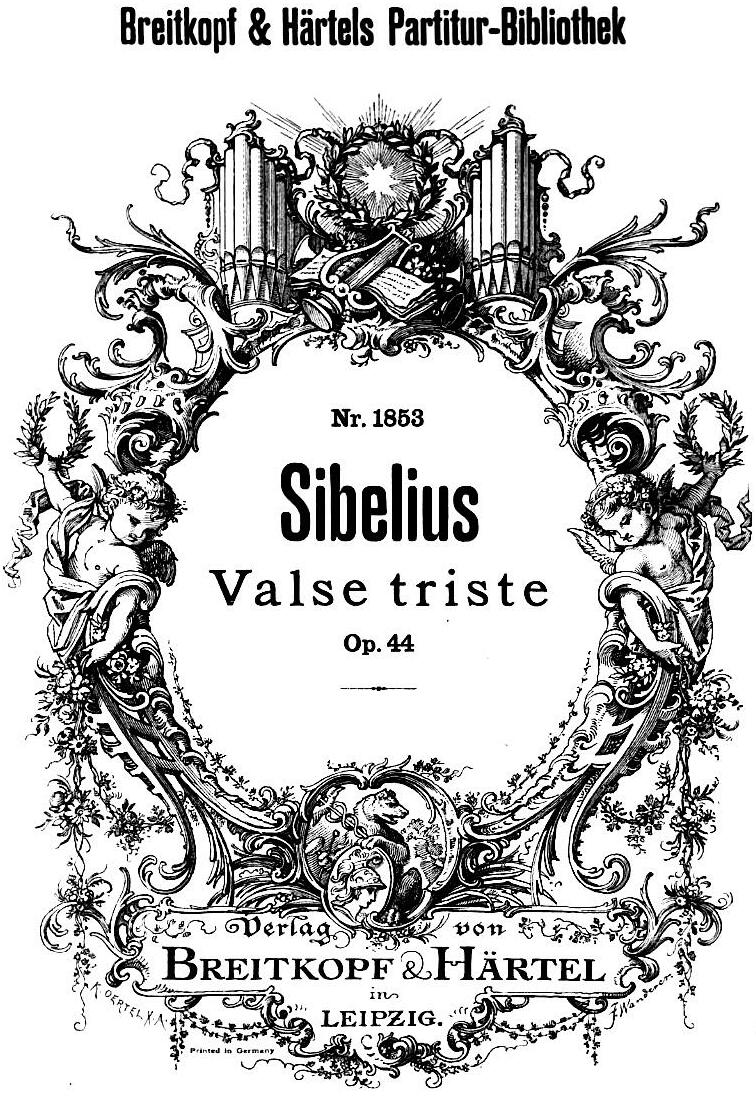
Breitkopf & Härtel's first edition of Valse triste, Sibelius's most famous composition

Sibelius sold his music to several publishers over the course of his career. As a relatively unknown composer in the 1890s and early 1900s, he worked with domestic firms in Helsinki, including the eponymous operations of Axel E. Lindgren and Karl F. Wasenius, as well as Helsingfors Nya Musikhandel, a joint venture of Konrad G. Fazer and Robert E. Westerlund until the latter withdrew in 1904 to begin his own firm. (Note: Because Imperial Russia—and by extension the Grand Duchy of Finland—was not a member of the Berne Convention of 1886, these Finnish publishers in turn relied upon the Leipzig-based firm of Breitkopf & Härtel for copyright protection in the major European markets, as well as in the United States, the independent copyright regime of which Breitkopf & Härtel had the resources to navigate.) As Sibelius's international reputation grew, the major German firms came calling, and he relished not only the prestige but also the opportunity to free himself from the cumbersome domestic publishing process. He contracted with Berlin's Robert Lienau Musikverlag from 1905 to 1909 and with Leipzig's Breitkopf & Härtel from 1910 to 1918. The arrival of the First World War in 1914, however, disrupted business with Germany, and Sibelius's royalty payments had to be rerouted through neutral Denmark. Ever in debt, Sibelius churned out undistinguished, "bread-and-butter" violin duos and piano pieces for R. E. Westerlund and A. E. Lindgren, each of whom lacked the means to print the works but viewed them as shrewd investments. (Note: Westerlund took on Lindgren's contracts upon the latter's death in 1919. Many of Westerlund's purchases from this period, in turn, were acquired later by Edition Wilhelm Hansen in Copenhagen. Some of these Edition Wilhelm Hansen acquired directly from Westerlund, whereas other Westerlund sold to the London-based firms of Augener & Co. and J. & W. Chester, who then later sold them to Hansen.)

The end of the war brought little relief, as famine and civil war gripped newly-sovereign Finland and reparations wrecked the German economy. Breitkopf & Härtel wrote to the composer in May 1918 to express its regret that it could not accept the Fifth Symphony due to the post-war circumstances. Into the breach stepped Edition Wilhelm Hansen in Copenhagen, which directly contracted with Sibelius in 1920 and, over the next half decade, emerged as Sibelius's leading publisher. (Note: During this time, Sibelius also signed with Carl Fischer Music in New York; Hansen, however, acquired the right to produce parallel editions.) In 1926, Breitkopf & Härtel was able to resume its publishing relationship with Sibelius, although it now had to share the composer with Hansen and others. At any rate, Sibelius spent the 1930s battling with the never-realized Eighth Symphony, and by the 1940s he had drifted into quasi retirement. Following his death in 1957, many compositions remained in manuscript, and the process of publishing his works posthumously began. Over the following decades, the Sibelius family agreed to allow several first editions variously by Hansen, Breitkopf & Härtel, and Musiikki-Fazer. (Note: In 1967, Fazer acquired Westerlund's remaining Sibelius editions; in 1994, Warner/Chappell Music Finland Oy purchased Fazer.)

=== Sibelius's manuscripts ===
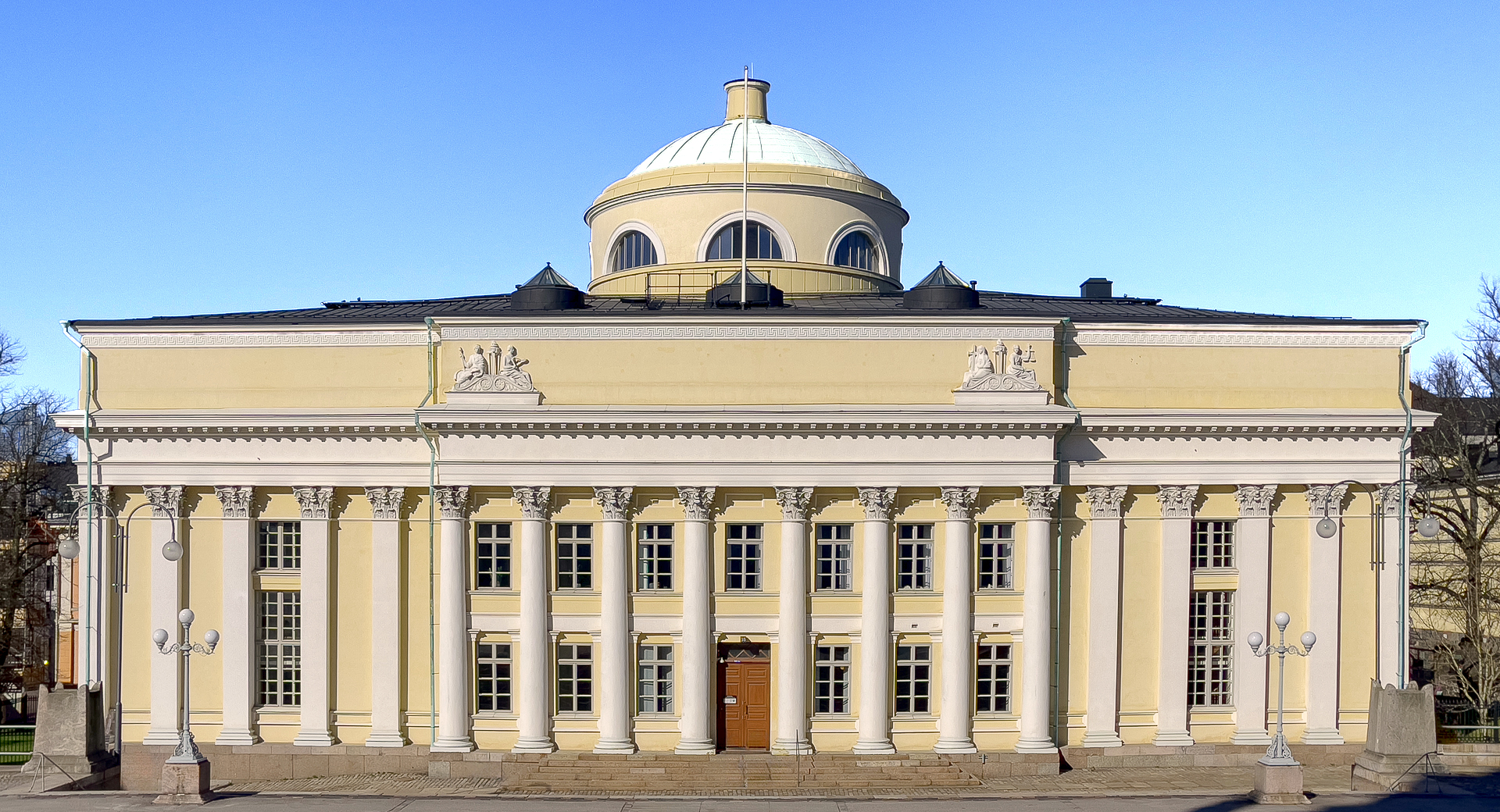
The National Library of Finland in Helsinki has custodianship over the vast majority of Sibelius's manuscripts.

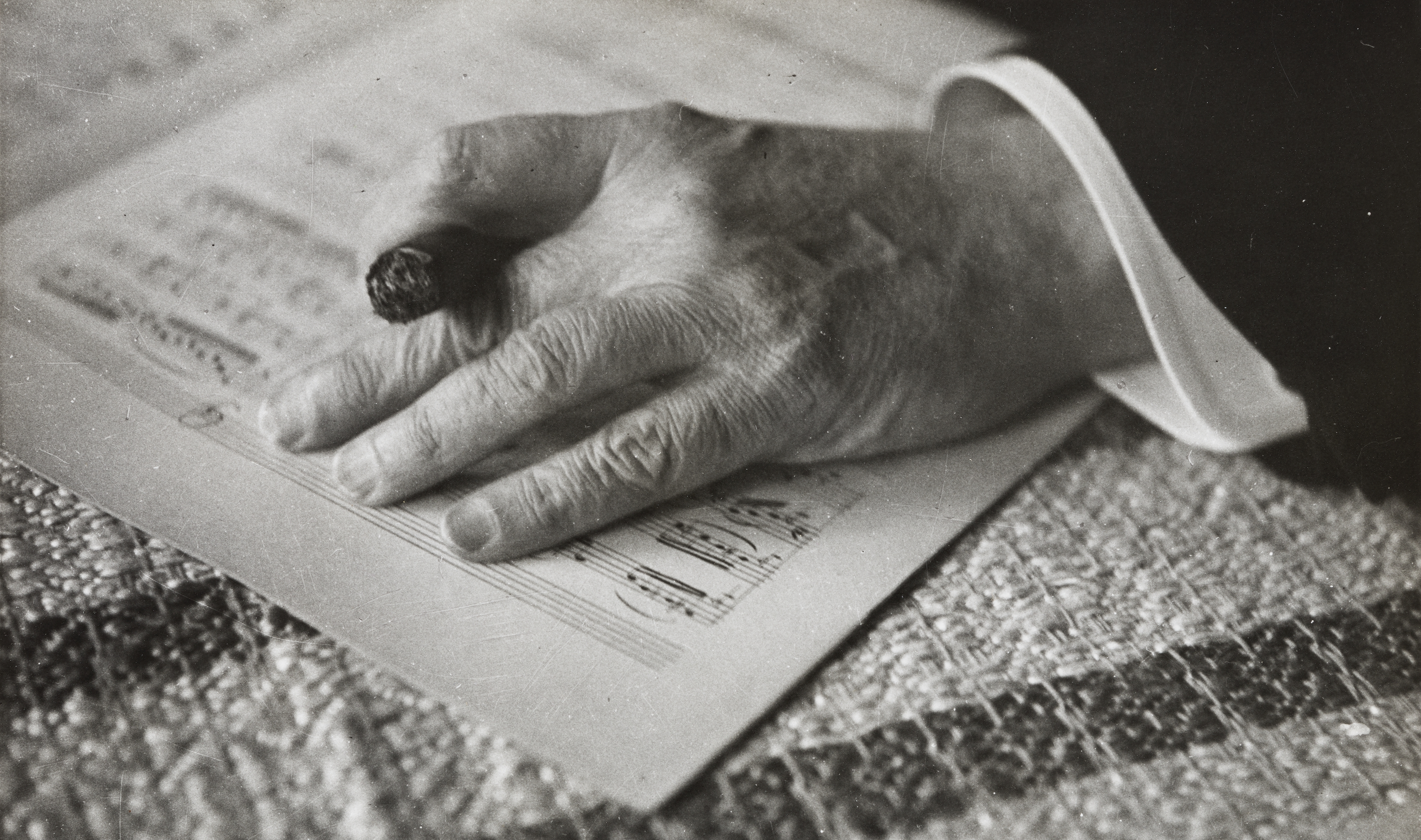
Sibelius, a cigar connoisseur, places a hand on one of his scores (c. 1930).

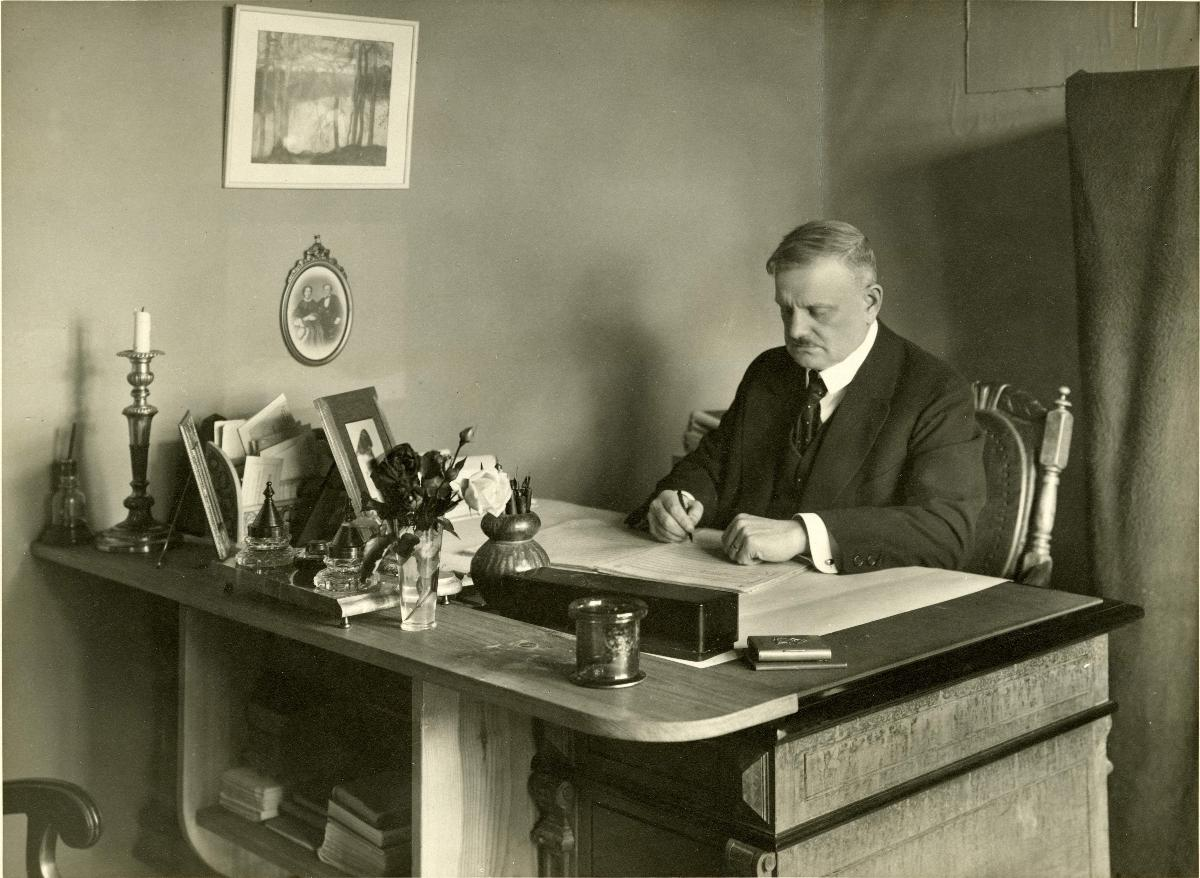
Sibelius pictured (1915) in his study at Ainola; in this house, he composed most of his works, post-1904.

The largest and most comprehensive collection of Sibelius's manuscripts is owned by the National Library of Finland at the University of Helsinki. The institution began in earnest its mission to acquire the composer's literary estate in 1970, with the purchase—from the London auction house Sotheby's—of manuscripts that had once belonged to A. E. Lindgren and, thereafter, R. E. Westerlund. The National Library's holdings ballooned (and the need for a supplemental catalogue became especially acute), however, in 1982, when the Sibelius family donated all papers still in its possession. The gift more than doubled Sibelius's catalogue: among the nearly 2,000 manuscripts were not only drafts, thematic sketches, and page proofs related to known compositions, but also hitherto unknown juvenilia.

In 1991, the Finnish musicologist Kari Kilpeläinen published The Jean Sibelius Musical Manuscripts at Helsinki University Library: A Complete Catalogue, in which each manuscript received a Helsinki University Library (HUL) identifier. The JS and HUL numbering systems, moreover, are compatible; for example, Sibelius's destroyed Eighth Symphony is numbered JS 190 by Dahlström, with the surviving so-called Three Late Fragments that have been tentatively connected to the Eighth Symphony labeled as HUL 1325, HUL 1326/9, and HUL 1327/2 by Kilpeläinen. A third notable acquisition occurred shortly after Kilpeläinen published his book, when in 1997 the National Library obtained manuscripts that had belonged to Edition Wilhelm Hansen. Finally, in 2020, the institution purchased a 1,200-page collection from Robert Lienau Musikverlag. In 2021, the UNESCO National Committee of Finland inducted the National Library's Jean Sibelius Musical Manuscripts into the country's Memory of the World Register, describing it as a "carefully nurtured national cultural treasure ... [that] has crucially expanded and shaped the image of how Sibelius composed and produced his works".

Within Finland, additional manuscripts are held by the Sibelius Museum at Åbo Akademi University in Turku, the Sibelius Academy (the composer's alma mater, formerly the Helsinki Music Institute), the Helsinki Philharmonic Orchestra (which premiered most of his orchestral works), and the National Archives of Finland. It is not legally possible to export Sibelius's manuscripts from Finland without permission, which in any case the Finnish authorities would probably not give. Outside of Finland, Breitkopf & Härtel possesses the most notable collection of Sibelius manuscripts.

=== Notable surveys of the oeuvre ===
In addition to Dahlström's comprehensive 2003 book, two additional surveys of Sibelius's oeuvre are of note. First, an ongoing collaborative project involving the National Library, Breitkopf & Härtel, and the Sibelius Society of Finland is the publication of the Jean Sibelius Works (JSW) critical edition, the text-critical approach of which utilizes "Sibelius's autograph musical manuscripts, copies made of them, instrumental parts, as well as first editions and their proofs ... the composer's correspondence, his diary, scribes' receipts, publishers' accounts, and newspaper reviews". Began in 1996, the JSW is projected at 52–60 volumes and will cover all of Sibelius's completed compositions (and arrangements), many of which remain in manuscript and, therefore, will receive first editions. The current editor-in-chief is the Finnish musicologist Timo Virtanen. (Note: The Jean Sibelius Works (JSW) critical edition has had three editors-in-chief, as follows: Fabian Dahlström (1996–2000), Glenda Dawn Goss (editor: 1998–2000; editor-in-chief: 2000–2004), and Timo Virtanen (acting editor-in-chief: 2004–2005; permanent editor-in-chief: 2006–present). In addition, Esko Häkli (chair of the editorial committee, 1996–2019), Kari Kilpeläinen (editor: 1996–2002 and 2005–2015), and Jukka Tiilikainen (editor: 1996–2003) were founding contributors.)

A second important survey is The Sibelius Edition recording project by the Swedish label BIS, for which the Sibelius biographer Andrew Barnett served as project advisor. Released from 2007 to 2011, this 13-volume series, which sought to record every surviving "note [Sibelius] put down to paper", comprises 80+ hours of music over 68 discs and also includes the original versions of works the composer revised. (Note: In addition, the Finnish labels Finlandia (which Warner Music acquired in 1994) and Ondine, as well as the budget label Naxos, have recorded not only Sibelius's orchestral works, but also the less well-known portions of his oeuvre, including his chamber works, songs, piano pieces, and choral music.)

== Table of compositions ==
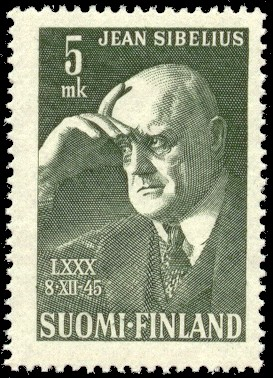
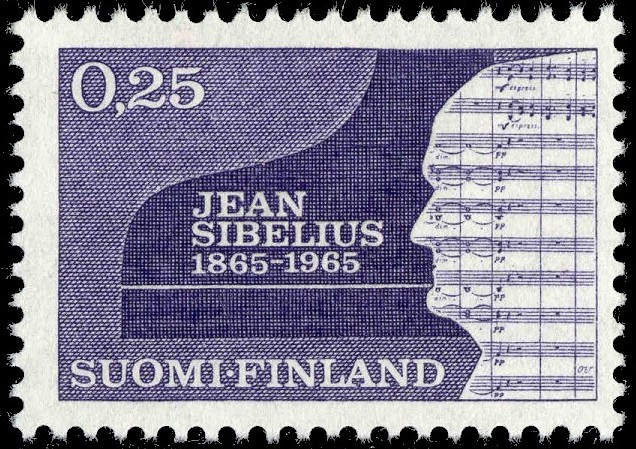
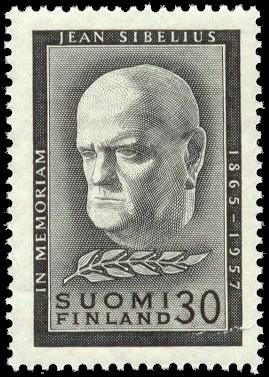
Finnish postage stamps honoring Sibelius, a cultural icon

The table below is a complete list of works by Jean Sibelius, compiled with reference to two sources: first, Dahlström's 2003 Jean Sibelius: A Thematic Bibliographic Index of His Works; and second, the track listings for all 13 volumes of BIS's The Sibelius Edition. The table contains six sortable parameters: genre, title, year of composition, catalogue number (either Op. or JS), instrumentation, and text author (if applicable). The default ordering is, first, by genre and, second, by year of composition. Finally, to aid visualization, the table is divided into color-coded subsections, as follows:

§ Orchestral works; § Chamber works	§ Works for solo instrument; § Songs	§ Choral works; § Preliminary versions, fragments

Genre	Title	Year(s) composed	Catalogue	Instrumentation	Text (Note: For compositions that include words, this column provides the name of the text's author (e.g., poet, librettist, etc.) or, in cases where there is no author, the name of the text (e.g., the Kalevala or the Kanteletar). In addition, relevant text information is provided parenthetically for a subset of compositions without words, if they: were derived from an earlier work with words (e.g., the orchestral overture Sibelius arranged from his opera The Maiden in the Tower is listed as: "– (R. Hertzberg)"); were intended to accompany a literary source (e.g., the purely instrumental incidental music Sibelius wrote for Strindberg's play Swanwhite is listed as: "– (A. Strindberg)"); were inspired by a literary source (e.g., the tone poem Pohjola's Daughter, which wordlessly portrays a story from the Finnish national epic, is listed as: "– (Kalevala)"))	Notes
=== Orchestral works ===						
Symphony	Kullervo: 1. Introduction (Johdanto). Allegro moderato; 2. Kullervo's Youth (Kullervon nuoruus). Grave; 3. Kullervo and His Sister (Kullervo ja hänen sisarensa). Allegro vivace; 4. Kullervo Goes to War (Kullervon sotaanlähtö). Alla marcia; 5. Kullervo's Death (Kullervon kuolema). Andante	1891–1892 (withdrawn 1893)	Op. 7	S, B, mchor., orch.	Kalevala, Runos XXXV–VI	(Note: In 1893, Sibelius withdrew Kullervo, saying he wanted to revise it; he never did so. Nevertheless, in 1892–1893, he excerpted Kullervo's concluding monologue from Movement III and arranged it for voice (in German, rather than the Finnish original) and piano as Kullervos Wehruf (Kullervo's Lament); due to the differences between Finnish and German, he made alterations to the metre of the vocal line. Later in 1917–1918, he used the German arrangement to make new one in Finnish for voice and piano, changing the metre back (Kullervon valitus). Finally, in 1957, he arranged Kullervo's Lament for baritone and orchestra.)
Symphony	Symphony No. 1 in E minor: 1. Andante, ma non troppo – Allegro energico; 2. Andante (ma non troppo lento); 3. Scherzo. Allegro; 4. Finale (Quasi una fantasia). Andante – Allegro molto	1898–1899, rev. 1900	Op. 39	orch.	–	(Note: From 1898–1899, Sibelius worked on his First Symphony (Op. 39). In 1900, in preparation for the Finnish music program at the Paris World Exhibition, he revised the symphony. (the original version does not survive, although a complete draft score made during the revision process is extant).)
Symphony	Symphony No. 2 in D major: 1. Allegretto; 2. Tempo andante, ma rubato; 3. Vivacissimo –; 4. Finale. Allegro moderato	1901–1902	Op. 43	orch.	–	(Note: From 1901–1902, Sibelius worked on his Second Symphony (Op. 43); two themes that eventually ended up in Movement II were briefly intended for projected works that never materialized: first, a theme labeled "Death" (related to Don Juan) was meant for 'Festival: Four Tone-Poems for Orchestra'; and second, a theme labeled "Christus" was related to a composition after Dante's Divine Comedy. Finally, in 1902, Sibelius made a few minor changes in preparing the symphony for publication.)
Symphony	Symphony No. 3 in C major: 1. Allegro moderato; 2. Andantino con moto, quasi allegretto; 3. Moderato – Allegro (ma non tanto)	1904–1907	Op. 52	orch.	–	(Note: The second movement of the Third Symphony contains material from 1905's abandoned oratorio Marjatta.)
Symphony	Symphony No. 4 in A minor: 1. Tempo molto moderato, quasi adagio; 2. Allegro molto vivace; 3. Il tempo largo; 4. Allegro	1909–1911	Op. 63	orch.	–	(Note: From late 1909–1911, Sibelius busied himself with his Fourth Symphony (Op. 63)—the first, germinal ideas appear to have been piano sketches from September 1909 called 'The Mountain' and 'Thoughts of a Wayfarer', which may have ended up in the symphony's first and third movements, respectively. Moreover, in November 1910, Sibelius began working on a new orchestral song, for the Finnish soprano Aino Ackté, based on Poe's poem The Raven. By December, however, he had abandoned the project; nevertheless, some of the material from "The Raven" eventually made its way into the finale of the Fourth. In late 1911, Sibelius made a few minor changes in preparing the symphony for publication.)
Symphony	Symphony No. 5 in E♭ major: 1. Tempo molto moderato – Allegro moderato; 2. Andante mosso, quasi allegretto; 3. Allegro molto – Largamente assai	1914–1915, rev. 1916 & 1917–1919	Op. 82	orch.	–	(Note: Sibelius's work on his Fifth (Op. 82), Sixth (Op. 104), and Seventh (Op. 105) symphonies overlapped, as he sorted his motifs and refined his symphonic ideals. In 1915, Sibelius completed the Symphony No. 5, which was then in four movements. However, in 1916, he substantially revised the piece, and by merging the first two movements, created a three-movement work. From 1918–1919, Sibelius undertook a second revision and produced the final, three-movement version of the Fifth. (Two ideas he considered but ultimately rejected were: first, to write an entirely new first movement; and second, to scrap Movements II–III.) The original 1915 version of the symphony is extant, while the intermediate 1916 version is—with the exception of a double bass part—lost.)
Symphony	Symphony No. 6 in D minor: 1. Allegro molto moderato; 2. Allegretto moderato; 3. Poco vivace; 4. Allegro molto	1914–1923	Op. 104	orch.	–	(Note: Sibelius's work on his Fifth (Op. 82), Sixth (Op. 104), and Seventh (Op. 105) symphonies overlapped, as he sorted his motifs and refined his symphonic ideals. The Symphony No. 6—at one point referred to as Fantasia I—also incorporated material from a 1919–1920 (eventually abandoned) Kalevala-themed project: a tone poem called The Moon Goddess (Kuutar; no catalogue number). Moreover, a theme initially intended for the symphony eventually made its way into the finale of the Violin Sonatina in E major (Op. 80).)
Symphony	Symphony No. 7 in C major, in one movement	1914–1924	Op. 105	orch.	–	(Note: Sibelius's work on his Fifth (Op. 82), Sixth (Op. 104), and Seventh (Op. 105) symphonies overlapped, as he sorted his motifs and refined his symphonic ideals. His initial plan (c. 1918) for what would become Op. 105 was a symphony in three movements; by 1922, this had evolved into a four-movement work and, by 1923, finally into a single-movement composition that eroded the traditional subdivisions of sonata form. The completed piece initially premiered under the ambivalent title of Fantasia sinfonica, but at some point in 1924–1925, Sibelius decided to 'promote' it to his Symphony No. 7. Two different preliminary endings [HUL 0354 and HUL 0353] are extant.)
Symphony	Symphony No. 8	1924–c. late 1930s–1945 (abandoned)	JS 190	orch. (projected)	–	(Note: Manuscript destroyed by composer, likely in the 1940s; very few sketches survive.)
Concertante	Violin Concerto in D minor: 1. Allegro moderato; 2. Adagio di molto; 3. Allegro (ma non tanto)	1903–1904, rev. 1905	Op. 47	vl., orch.	–	(Note: Sibelius heavily revised the Violin Concerto in 1905 (the original version is extant). That same year, he transcribed the piece for violin and piano.)
Concertante	Serenade No. 1 in D major	1912	Op. 69a	vl., orch.	–	(Note: These works comprise the Op. 69 Two Serenades. Sibelius considered—but decided against—titling the D major serenade I gammalt hem (In the Old Home) and the G minor serenade Romance.)
Concertante	Serenade No. 2 in G minor	1912–1913	Op. 69b	vl., orch.	–	
Concertante	Serious Melody No. 1: Cantique	1914 (arr. 1916)	Op. 77/1	vl. (or vc.), orch.	–	(Note: These works, Cantique and Devotion, comprise the Op. 77 Two Serious Melodies. They are also known by their Latin subtitles, respectively as: Laetare anima mea" ("Rejoice My Soul") and "Ab imo pectore" ("From My Very Heart"). In 1915, Sibelius transcribed the melodies for violin and piano. The year after, he arranged them for cello and orchestra and made transcriptions for cello and piano.)
Concertante	Serious Melody No. 2: Devotion	1915 (arr. 1916)	Op. 77/2	vl. (or vc.), orch.	–	
Concertante	Humoresque No. 1 in D minor	1917, rev. 1940	Op. 87/1	vl., orch.	–	(Note: Although published over two opus numbers (Opp. 87/1–2 and 89/1–4), Sibelius intended the Six Humoresques to be played as a suite. In 1940, he revised No. 1's instrumentation after the 1917 version was lost (this version was rediscovered in 1982 and is now extant).)
Concertante	Humoresque No. 2 in D major	1917	Op. 87/2	vl., orch.	–	
Concertante	Humoresque No. 3 in G minor	1917	Op. 89a	vl., str.	–	
Concertante	Humoresque No. 4 in G minor	1917	Op. 89b	vl., str.	–	
Concertante	Humoresque No. 5 in E♭ major	1917	Op. 89c	vl., orch.	–	
Concertante	Humoresque No. 6 in G minor	1918	Op. 89d	vl., orch.	–	
Concertante	Suite for Violin and String Orchestra: 1. Country Scenery; 2. Serenade: Evening in Spring; 3. In the Summer	1929	JS 185	vl., str.	–	(Note: In 1929, Sibelius composed the Suite for Violin and String Orchestra (JS 185). Upon its rejection by a publisher, however, Sibelius began—but did not complete—a revision.)
Tone poem	En saga (Satu)	1890–1892, rev. 1902	Op. 9	orch.	–	(Note: Sibelius composed En saga (Op. 9)—sometimes translated as A Fairy Tale, A Saga, or A Legend—in 1892–1893. Some scholars believe the piece began as a chamber work for flute, clarinet, and string sextet or septet from 1890–1891, although the original sketches do not survive. In 1902, Sibelius substantially revised En saga; the original 1893 version is extant.)
Tone poem	Spring Song (Vårsång)	1894, rev. 1895	Op. 16	orch.	–	(Note: In 1894, Sibelius composed an Improvisaatio (Improvisation) for orchestra. However, in 1895, he withdrew and revised the piece, changing the key from F major to D major and renaming it Spring Song (Vårsång). Scholars formerly believed that a second revision to Spring Song had occurred in 1902, but more recent scholarship has established that a second revision never took place. The original 1894 version is extant.)
Tone poem	The Wood Nymph (Skogsrået)	1894–1895	Op. 15	orch.	– (V. Rydberg)	(Note: The Wood Nymph (Op. 15), to which Sibelius gave the subtitle "Ballade pour l'orchestre", refers to two thematically-related compositions: first, a tone poem for orchestra; and second, a melodrama for narrator, piano, two horns, and strings. Sibelius claimed to have completed the melodrama first, which he then expanded into the longer tone poem. Musicologists, however, suspect the reverse is true: that the tone poem came first and then was condensed into the melodrama. Scholars also suspect that some of The Wood Nymph's material may have originated from Sibelius's discarded opera project, The Building of the Boat. The tone poem was thought lost until its rediscovery in the early 1990s by Kari Kilpeläinen. Finally, in 1895, Sibelius arranged the coda for solo piano as Ur Skogsrået.)
Tone poem	The Swan of Tuonela (Tuonelan joutsen)	1893–1895, rev. 1897 & 1900	Op. 22/2	orch.	– (Kalevala)	(Note: From 1895–1896, Sibelius composed the four-movement Lemminkäinen Suite (Lemminkäis-sarjaan, Op. 22). Surviving sketches indicate that Sibelius rescued some material from his discarded 1893 opera project, The Building of the Boat; for example, the opera's overture evolved into Lemminkäinen's The Swan of Tuonela. The original ordering of the Lemminkäinen Suite was as follows: Lemminkäinen and the Maidens of the Island (which is occasionally mistranslated as Lemminkäinen and the Maidens of Saari) was No. 1; Lemminkäinen in Tuonela was No. 2; The Swan of Tuonela was No. 3, and Lemminkäinen's Return (sometimes translated as Lemminkäinen's Homeward Journey) was No. 4. In 1897, Sibelius revised the entire suite, and in 1900, he again revised The Swan of Tuonela and Lemminkäinen's Return for publication in 1901. Lemminkäinen and the Maidens of the Island and Lemminkäinen in Tuonela were neglected for four decades until 1939, when Sibelius revised them for publication (although they were not published until 1954) and reversed the order of The Swan of Tuonela and Lemminkäinen in Tuonela (now Ops. 22/2 and 22/3, respectively). The original the 1895–1896 versions of all but The Swan of Tuonela are extant; the 1897 version of The Swan of Tuonela is lost, while the 1897 versions of Lemminkäinen and the Maidens of the Island and Lemminkäinen in Tuonela are not performable; the 1897 Lemminkäinen's Return is extant. The thematic material (a fanfare) that forms the basis of A Song for Lemminkäinen comes from the original, 1895–1896 ending of Lemminkäinen's Return (Op. 22/4). Upon revising the piece (either in 1897 or 1900), Sibelius transplanted this final section into the song for male choir and orchestra.)
Tone poem	Lemminkäinen's Return (Lemminkäinen palaa kotitienoille)	1895, rev. 1897 & 1900	Op. 22/4	orch.	– (Kalevala)	
Tone poem	Lemminkäinen and the Maidens of the Island (Lemminkäinen ja saaren neidot)	1895, rev. 1897 & 1939	Op. 22/1	orch.	– (Kalevala)	
Tone poem	Lemminkäinen in Tuonela (Lemminkäinen Tuonelassa)	1895, rev. 1897 & 1939	Op. 22/3	orch.	– (Kalevala)	
Tone poem	Finlandia, from the Press Celebrations Music	[1899], arr. 1900	Op. 26	orch.	–	(Note: Extracted by the composer from the sixth tableau, Suomi herää (Finland Awakes), of JS 137.)
Tone poem	Pohjola's Daughter (Pohjolan tytär)	1903–1906	Op. 49	orch.	– (Kalevala)	(Note: Pohjola's Daughter (Pohjolan tytär, Op. 49), to which Sibelius gave the subtitle Symphonische Fantasie (Symphonic Fantasy), was composed in 1906. However, some of its themes trace to an earlier project on the subject of Luonnotar from 1903–1905; that 'Luonnotar' (for which a fragment is extant) grew out of the abandoned oratorio Marjatta (without catalogue number) and, by 1906, evolved into the Op. 49 tone poem. It is thematically unrelated to the later Luonnotar (Op. 70) tone poem for soprano and orchestra from 1913; that same year, Sibelius arranged Luonnotar for soprano and piano.)
Tone poem	Nightride and Sunrise (Öinen ratsastus ja auringonnousu)	1908	Op. 55	orch.	–	
Tone poem	The Dryad (Dryadi)	1910	Op. 45/1	orch.	–	(Note: In 1910, Sibelius arranged The Dryad for solo piano.)
Tone poem	The Bard (Barden)	1913, rev. 1913	Op. 64	orch.	–	(Note: The Oceanides (Aallottaret, Op. 73) survives in three forms: first, a three-movement preliminary orchestral suite in E♭ major that dates to 1913 (No. 1 is lost, while Nos. 2–3 are extant); second, the initial ("Yale") version of the tone poem in D♭ major that dates to 1914; and third, the revised version of the tone poem in D major that Sibelius undertook en route to America. Barnett (2007) has also speculated that the lost first movement from the "pre-Oceanides suite" may be the missing first version of the tone poem The Bard (Barden, Op. 64), which Sibelius had written—and also revised—in 1913.)
Tone poem	Luonnotar	1913	Op. 70	S, orch.	Kalevala, Runo I	
Tone poem	The Oceanides (Aallottaret)	1913–1914, rev. 1914 & 1914	Op. 73	orch.	–	
Tone poem	Kuutar (The Moon Goddess)	1919–early 1920s (abandoned)	–	orch. (projected)	– (Kalevala)	
Tone poem	Tapiola	1926	Op. 112	orch.	– (Kalevala)	(Note: Although Sibelius's final tone poem, Tapiola (Op. 112), takes its inspiration from the Kalevala, it does not depict an actual story from within its runos—indeed, Sibelius (with his wife's assistance) suggested the English translation should be The Forest, rather than the literal translation of The Realm of Tapio. Sibelius considered making cuts to Tapiola prior to its November premiere, but was unable to do so because the publisher had already been engraved the piece.)
Opera	The Building of the Boat (Veneen luominen)	1893–1894 (abandoned)	–	soloists, chor., orch. (projected)	J. Sibelius & J.H. Erkko; Kalevala, Runos VIII & XVI	(Note: The Building of the Boat was Sibelius's plan for a Wagnerian grand opera. By September 1894, however, he had abandoned the project and began to rework most of its material into the Lemminkäinen Suite (and perhaps, too, The Wood Nymph, Op. 15). For example, the opera's overture became The Swan of Tuonela (Op. 22/2).)
Opera	The Maiden in the Tower (Jungfrun i tornet), dramatized Finnish ballad in 1 act	1896 (withdrawn 1896)	JS 101	S, A, T, B, chor., orch.	R. Hertzberg	(Note: In 1896, Sibelius withdrew The Maiden in the Tower (for which a rehearsal score for soloists, mixed choir, and piano accompaniment is also extant), saying he wanted to revise it; he never did. In the 2010s, a 12-minute, derivative concert overture for orchestra—marked by Sibelius and "hiding among the [original 1896] orchestral parts"—was "discovered" by Tuomas Hannikainen. It is not to be confused with the actual 3-minute overture of the opera.)
Stage	King Christian II (Kuningas Kristian II), play in 5 acts	1898, rev. 1898	Op. 27	B, orch.	A. Paul	(Note: The incidental music for King Christian II was originally in four numbers for the 24 February 1898 premiere: 1) Elegie, 2) Musette, 3) Menuetto, and 4) Fool's Song of the Spider (Sången om korsspindeln). No. 3 is a reworking of an earlier orchestral work—Menuetto (JS 127)—that dates to 1894, while No. 4 is an orchestral song for baritone. In the summer of 1898, Sibelius added three additional movements: 5) Nocturne, 6) Serenade, and 7) Ballade; shortly thereafter, he arranged a five-movement concert suite for orchestra (also Op. 27). Moreover, in 1898, Sibelius arranged Nos. 1–4 from the theatre score for solo piano, as well as No. 4 as a song for baritone and piano.)
Stage	Death (Kuolema), play in 3 acts	1903	JS 113	Mz, B, str., perc.	A. Järnefelt	(Note: Nos. 2—Moderato (Paavali's Song)–and 3—Moderato assai – Moderato (Elsa's Song) – Poco adagio—from the incidental music for [[Kuolema (Sibelius)|Kuolema]] are orchestral songs for baritone and mezzo-soprano, respectively. Sibelius excerpted and revised the score to produce two concert pieces for orchestra: in 1904, No. 1—Tempo di valse lente – Poco risoluto—as Valse triste (Op. 44/1); and in 1906, the outer sections of No. 3 (Moderato assai and Poco adagio) with No. 4—Andante—as Scene with Cranes (Op. 44/2). In 1904, he also transcribed Valse triste for solo piano. Finally, for a 1911 production of the play, he wrote two new numbers for a revised version of Järnefelt's play: Canzonetta (Op. 62/1)—originally titled Rondo der Liebenden (Rondo of the Lovers) and written in 1906—and Valse romantique (Op. 62/1)—originally titled Vals-intermezzo.)
Stage	Pelléas et Mélisande (Pelléas och Mélisande), play in 5 acts	1904–1905	JS 147	Mz, orch.	M. Maeterlinck – B. Gripenberg, trans. (sv)	(Note: No. 6—The Three Blind Sisters (De trenne blinda systrar)—from the incidental music for [[Pelléas et Mélisande (Sibelius)|Pelléas et Mélisande]] is an orchestral song for mezzo-soprano; in 1905, Sibelius arranged it for voice and piano (JS 147/6). Moreover, in 1905, Sibelius derived a nine-movement concert suite for orchestra (Op. 46); he also transcribed it for solo piano the same year (except No. 2a).)
Stage	Belshazzar's Feast (Belsazars gästabud), play in 4 acts	1906	JS 48	Mz, orch.	H. Procopé	(Note: No. 2b— The Jewish Girl's Song (Den judiska flickans sång)—from the incidental music for Belshazzar's Feast is an orchestral song for mezzo-soprano; in 1907 (revised 1939), Sibelius arranged it for voice and piano (JS 48/2b). Moreover, from 1906–1907, Sibelius derived a four-movement concert suite for orchestra (Op. 51); he also transcribed it for solo piano the same year.)
Stage	Canzonetta, added to Death (Kuolema)	1906, rev. 1911	Op. 62/1	str.	– (A. Järnefelt)	
Stage	Swanwhite (Svanevit), play in 3 acts	1908	JS 189	orch. + organ	– (A. Strindberg)	(Note: A fragment for an alternative version of No. 9—Largo—is extant. In 1908, Sibelius derived from the incidental music for Swanwhite a seven-movement concert suite (Op. 54).)
Stage	The Language of the Birds (Die Sprache der Vögel)	1911	JS 62	orch.	– (A. Paul)	(Note: Publisher: MFz (1997). Sibelius composed a wedding march for Act III of The Language of the Birds (although no production of the play appears to have used the piece).)
Stage	Valse romantique, added to Death (Kuolema)	1911	Op. 62/2	orch.	– (A. Järnefelt)	
Stage	Scaramouche, ballet-pantomime in 2 acts	1912–1913	Op. 71	orch. + pf.	P. Knudsen	(Note: Sibelius derived three additional works from Scaramouche: Danse élégiaque and Scène d'amour were arranged in 1914 for solo piano, and in 1925, the Sibelius arranged (or perhaps more accurately, revised as "almost a new piece") the latter for violin and piano. The twenty-minute 'Scaramouche Suite' is a sanctioned excerption by the composer's son-in-law, Jussi Jalas, that maintains Sibelius's original orchestration.)
Stage	Everyman (Jedermann or Jokamies), play in 1 act	1916	Op. 83	Mz, T, B, chor., orch. + pf., organ	H. von Hofmannsthal – H. Jalkanen, trans. (fi)	(Note: In 1925, Sibelius considered excerpting a suite from Everyman, but never did so. In the end, in 1925, he merely arranged for solo piano Nos. 2 (Largo), 4 (Tempo commodo), and 8 (Allegretto – Allegro) as, respectively, Episodio, Canzone, and Scéna.)
Stage	The Tempest (Stormen), play in 5 acts	1925, rev. 1927	JS 182	S, Mz, T, T, B, chor., orch. + harmonium	W. Shakespeare – E. Lembcke, trans. (da, 1926) – P. Cajander, trans. (fi, 1927)	(Note: In 1925, for the Royal Danish Theatre, Sibelius completed the incidental music to Shakespeare's The Tempest (JS 182, Danish-language translation by Edvard Lembcke). In 1927, a production at the Finnish National Theatre used a Finnish-language translation by Paavo Cajander, and Sibelius took the opportunity to add the concluding Epilogue (No. 34b), based on an earlier work from 1904: Cassazione (Op. 6). Also in 1927, he derived two, nine-movement concert suites (Op. 109/2–3), as well as the stand-alone Prelude (Op. 109/1), from the incidental music; each is for orchestra and is without voices. In the same year, he also transcribed three numbers for solo piano as Episode (Miranda), Dance of the Nymphs, and Scène. Finally, in 1929, Sibelius revised No. 5—Canon—from the first orchestral suite; the 1927 of Canon version is extant.)
Stage (arr.)	King Christian II Suite (Kuningas Kristian II): 1. Nocturne; 2. Elegie; 3. Musette; 4. Serenade; 5. Ballade	[1898], arr. 1898	→ Op. 27	orch.	– (A. Paul)	
Stage (arr.)	The Maiden in the Tower Overture (Jungfrun i tornet)	[1896], arr. 1900 (score markings)	→ JS 101	orch.	– (R. Hertzberg)	
Stage (arr.)	Valse triste, from Death (Kuolema)	[1903], arr. 1904	Op. 44/1	orch.	– (A. Järnefelt)	
Stage (arr.)	Pelléas et Mélisande Suite (Pelléas och Mélisande): 1. At the Castle Gate (Vid slottsporten); 2. Mélisande (a) At the Seashore (På stranded vid havet); 3. By a Spring in the Park (En källa i parken); 4. The Three Blind Sisters (De trenne blinda systrar); 5. Pastorale; 6. Mélisande at the Spinning Wheel (Mélisande vid sländan); 7. Entr'acte (Mellanaktsmusik); 8. The Death of Mélisande (Mélisandes död)	[1905], arr. 1905	Op. 46	orch.	– (M. Maeterlinck)	
Stage (arr.)	Scene with Cranes (Kurkikohtaus), from Death (Kuolema)	[1903], arr. 1906	Op. 44/2	orch.	– (A. Järnefelt)	
Stage (arr.)	Belshazzar's Feast Suite (Belsazars gästabud): 1. Oriental Procession (Orientalisk marsch); 2. Solitude; 3. Nocturne; 4. Khadra's Dance (Khadras dans)	[1906], arr. 1907	Op. 51	orch.	– (H. Procopé)	
Stage (arr.)	Swanwhite Suite (Svanevit): 1. The Peacock (Påfågeln); 2. The Harp (Harpan); 3. The Maiden with the Roses (Tärnorna med rosor); 4. Listen! The Robins sings (Hör rödhaken slå); 5. The Prince Alone (Prinsen allena); 6. Swanwhite and the Prince (Svanevit och prinsen); 7. Song of Praise (Lovsång)	[1908], arr. 1908	Op. 54	orch.	– (A. Strindberg)	
Stage (arr.)	The Tempest Prelude (Stormen)	[1925], arr. 1927	Op. 109/1	orch.	– (W. Shakespeare)	
Stage (arr.)	The Tempest Suite No. 1 (Stormen): 1. The Oak Tree (Der Eichbaum); 2. Humoreske; 3. Caliban's Song (Calibans Lied); 4. The Harvesters (Die Herbstmänner); 5. Canon; 6. Scéne; 7. Intrada – Berceuse; 8. Entr'acte – Ariel's Song (Zwischenspiel – Ariels Lied); 9. The Storm (Der Strum)	[1925], arr. 1927, rev. 1929	Op. 109/2	orch.	– (W. Shakespeare)	
Stage (arr.)	The Tempest Suite No. 2 (Stormen): 1. Chorus of the Winds (Chor der Winde); 2. Intermezzo; 3. Dance of the Nymphs (Tanz Der Nymphen); 4. Prospero; 5. Song I (Lied I); 6. Song II (Lied II); 7. Miranda; 8. The Naiads (Die Najaden); 9. Dance Episode (Tanz-Episode)	[1925], arr. 1927	Op. 109/3	orch.	– (W. Shakespeare)	
Oratorio	Marjatta	1905 (abandoned)	–	soloists, chor., orch. (projected)	J. Finne; Kalevala, Runo L	(Note: Sibelius began working on the Marjatta oratorio in 1905, but soon abandoned his plans the same year, likely due to a waning enthusiasm for Finne's libretto (based on the Kalevala's biblically-inspired Runo L). Musicologists speculate that material from the oratorio eventually made its way into numerous compositions: 1906's 'Luonnotar' tone poem, which itself evolved into Pohjola's Daughter (Op. 49); 1907's Third Symphony (Op. 52); the second movement (Love Song) of 1912's Scènes historiques II (Op. 66); and, possibly, 1905's Not with Lamentation (Ej med klagan, JS 69), for mixed choir a cappella; 1909's In memoriam (Sibelius) (Op. 59); and 1922's Andante festivo (JS 34a).)
Cantata	Cantata for the University Graduation Ceremonies of 1894 (Kantaatti tohtorinja maisterinvihkijäisissä 1894): 1. "When the world, when nature was created ..." ("Syntyi kun maailmat, luonto kun luotiin ..."); 2. "We burned the wilderness ..." ("Kaskeksi korvet ne raadettiin ..."); 3. Andantino	1894 (partially survives)	JS 105	S, B, chor., orch.	K. Leino	(Note: Cantata for the Graduation Ceremonies of 1894, which is sometimes called the Promotional Cantata, only partially survives: the soprano part for the third movement is lost; however, a rehearsal score with piano accompaniment is extant. In 1896, Sibelius made an arrangement for mixed choir a cappella and retitled as Festive March (Juhlamarssi).)
Cantata	Cantata for the Coronation of Nicholas II (Kantaatti iloja onnentoivotusjuhlassa 1896): 1. "Hail, young prince ..." ("Terve nuori ruhtinas ..."); 2. "In the sure security of justice ..." ("Oikeuden varmassa turvassa ...")	1896	JS 104	chor., orch.	P. Cajander	(Note: Sometimes referred to as the Coronation Cantata; in 1896, Sibelius arranged for orchestra a section of Part I from the Cantata for the Coronation of Emperor Nicholas II as the Coronation March (Kröningsmarsch). Finally, in 1913, he arranged a portion of the cantata as Hail Princess (Terve Ruhtinatar), for female (or children's) choir a cappella.)
Cantata	Cantata for the University Graduation Ceremonies of 1897 (Kantaatti tohtorinja maisterinvihkijäisissä 1897): 1. "We, the Youth of Finland" ("Me nuoriso Suomen"); 2. "A Boat Bobbing in the Water" ("Veno kupliksi vesille"); 3. "These Young Guardians of Light" ("Tää valon nuori vartiasto"); 4. "Sweet is the Knowledge that Bears Fruit" ("Soma on tieto siemeniksi"); 5. "Take Heed, Hard Work is Needed" ("Hei tointa tarmosaapa tarvitaan"); 6. "... to Become a Wreck" ("... hylyksi jouda"); 7. "O Hope, Hope, You Dreamer" ("Oi toivo, toivo, sä lietomieli"); 8. "Many on the Sea of Life" ("Montapa elon merellä"); 9. "... Now it is Summer in Finland" ("... Suvi nyt on Suomessa"); 10. We Praise Thee, our Creator ("Soi kiitokseksi Luojan"); 11. "Alone, Life is Cheerless" ("Yksin on elo iloton"); 12. "O Love, Your Realm is Limitless" ("Oi Lempi, sun valtas ääretön on"); 13. "As the Swift Current" ("Kuin virta vuolas"); 14. "Listen to the Spruce Tree" ("Sitä kuusta kuuleminen")	1897 (partially survives)	JS 106	S, B, chor., orch.	A.V. Koskimies	(Note: The complete score of the Cantata for the Graduation Ceremonies of 1897 is lost, although some orchestral parts, as well as a rehearsal score with piano accompaniment, are extant. (In 2010, Kalevi Aho and Timo Hongisto used these sources to reconstruct a performing version of the cantata, albeit for soprano, tenor, mixed choir, and piano.) In 1898, Sibelius excerpted from the Cantata for the Graduation Ceremonies of 1897 ten songs and arranged them as the Op. 23 Songs for Mixed Chorus from the 1897 Promotional Cantata (Lauluja sekaköörille 1897 vuoden promotiooni kantaatista), while in 1913 he arranged No. 6a—We Praise Thee, Our Creator (Soi kiitokseksi Luojan—for female (or children's) choir a cappella.)
Cantata	The Origin of Fire (Tulen synty)	1902, rev. 1910	Op. 32	B, mchor., orch.	Kalevala, Runo XLVII	(Note: In 1910, Sibelius revised the 1902 version of The Origin of Fire—which is extant—and also transcribed it for baritone, male choir, and piano.)
Cantata	The Captive Queen (Vapautettu kuningatar)	1906 (arr. c. 1910)	Op. 48	chor. (or mchor.), orch.	P. Cajander	(Note: Sometimes translated as The Liberated Queen, The Captive Queen is also known as the Cantata in Celebration of Snellman's Birth (Snellmanin juhla-kantaatti). To avoid the ire of the Russian censors, the piece premiered under the title There Sings the Queen (Siell' laulavi kuningatar). By 1910 (but perhaps as early as 1906), Sibelius arranged the piece for male choir and orchestra.)
Cantata	My Own Land (Oma maa)	1918	Op. 92	chor., orch.	S.K. Bergh	(Note: Oma maa is sometimes translated as Our Native Land.)
Cantata	Song of the Earth (Jordens sång)	1919	Op. 93	chor., orch.	J. Hemmer	(Note: Subtitled Cantata for the Inaugural Ceremonies of Åbo Academy University 1919.)
Cantata	Hymn of the Earth (Maan virsi)	1920	Op. 95	chor., orch.	E. Leino	
Cantata	Väinämöinen's Song (Väinön virsi)	1926	Op. 110	chor., orch.	Kalevala, Runo XVIII	
Melodrama	The Wood Nymph (Skogsrået)	1894–1895	→ Op. 15	Nar., orch. + pf.	V. Rydberg	
Melodrama	The Breaking of the Ice on the Oulu River (Islossningen i Uleå älv)	1899	Op. 30	Nar., mchor., orch.	Z. Topelius	(Note: Sibelius gave The Breaking of the Ice on the Oulu River the subtitle of "improvisation". In 1913, Sibelius arranged a short portion of the melodrama as The Landscape Breathes (Nejden andas), for female (or children's) choir a cappella. An alternative ending for The Landscape Breathes is also extant.)
Melodrama	Snöfrid	1900	Op. 29	Nar., chor., orch.	V. Rydberg	(Note: Sibelius gave Snöfrid the subtitle of "improvisation". In 1929, Hansen was the first to publish parts and full score; however, the choir parts—without publisher information—appeared in 1904.)
Melodrama	The Countess's Portrait (Grevinnans konterfej)	1906	JS 88	Nar., str.	Z. Topelius	(Note: The Countess's Portrait is sometimes recorded without the narration.)
Melodrama	A Lonely Ski-Trail (Ett ensamt skidspår)	[1925], arr. 1948	JS 77b	Nar., harp, str.	B. Gripenberg	(Note: Originally for narrator and piano (JS 77a), Sibelius arranged A Lonely Ski-Trail for narrator, harp, and strings in 1948.)
Orch. song	"Serenad" ("Serenade")	1894–1895	JS 168	B, orch.	E.J. Stagnelius	(Note: The "Serenad" (JS 168, 1895; Stagnelius) for baritone and orchestra and the "Serenad" (JS 167, 1888; Runeberg) for voice and piano are unrelated to each other.)
Orch. song	"Koskenlaskijan morsiamet" ("The Rapids-Rider's Brides")	1897	Op. 33	B, orch.	A. Oksanen	(Note: Originally for soloist and orchestra, Sibelius later made two arrangements of "Koskenlaskijan morsiamet" ("The Rapids-Rider's Brides"): in 1897–1899, for voice and piano; and in 1943, for male choir and orchestra. The song is sometimes translated as "The Ferryman's Brides" or "The Rapids-Shooter's Brides".)
Orch. song	"Se'n har jag ej frågat mera" ("Since Then I Have Questioned No Further")	[1891–1892], arr. 1903	→ Op. 17/1	voice, orch.	J.L. Runeberg	(Note: These songs comprise the Op. 17 Seven Songs, of which five are sung in Swedish and two in Finnish. Sibelius subsequently arranged "Se'n har jag ej frågat mera" ("Since Then I Have Questioned No Further") for voice and orchestra)
Orch. song	"På verandan vid havet" ("On a Balcony by the Sea")	[1903], arr. 1903	→ Op. 38/2	voice, orch.	V. Rydberg	(Note: These songs comprise the Op. 38 Five Songs, each of which is sung in Swedish. Sibelius subsequently arranged "Höstkväll" ("Autumn Evening"), "På verandan vid havet" ("On a Balcony by the Sea"), and "I natten" ("In the Night") for voice and orchestra.)
Orch. song	"I natten" ("In the Night")	[1903], arr. 1903	→ Op. 38/3	voice, orch.	V. Rydberg	
Orch. song	"Höstkväll" ("Autumn Evening")	[1903], arr. 1904	→ Op. 38/1	voice, orch. (or str.)	V. Rydberg	
Orch. song	"Arioso"	1911	→ Op. 3	S, str.	J.L. Runeberg	(Note: "Arioso" is a Swedish-language songs. Sibelius appears to have worked on two versions simultaneously: one for soprano and strings, the other for soprano and piano.)
Orch. song	"Hertig Magnus" ("Duke Magnus")	[1909], arr. 1912	→ Op. 57/6	voice, orch.	E. Josephson	(Note: These songs comprise the Op. 57 Eight Josephson Songs, each of which is sung in Swedish. Sibelius subsequently arranged "Hertig Magnus" ("Duke Magnus") for voice and orchestra. (This version of the song was lost until its rediscovery in 1943, only to be lost again and relocated in 1994.))
Orch. song	"Der Rabe" ("The Raven")	1910 (abandoned)	–	S, orch. (projected)	E. Poe – [Unknown], trans. (de)	
Orch. song	"Våren flyktar hastigt" ("Spring Is Flying")	[1891], arr. 1913	→ Op. 13/4	voice, orch.	J.L. Runeberg	(Note: These songs comprise the Op. 13 Seven Runeberg Songs, each of which is sung in Swedish. Sibelius subsequently arranged "Våren flyktar hastigt" ("Spring is Flying") for voice and orchestra.)
Orch. song	"Soluppgång" ("Sunrise")	[1902], arr. 1913	→ Op. 37/3	voice, orch.	T. Hedberg	(Note: These songs comprise the Op. 37 Five Songs, each of which is sung in Swedish. Sibelius subsequently arranged "Soluppgång" ("Sunrise") for voice and orchestra.)
Orch. song	"Demanten på marssnön" ("The Diamond on the March Snow")	[1900], arr. 1917	→ Op. 36/6	voice, orch.	J.J. Wecksell	(Note: These songs comprise the Op. 36 Six Songs, each of which is sung in Swedish. Sibelius subsequently arranged "Demanten på marssnön" ("The Diamond on the March Snow") for voice and orchestra.)
Orch. song	"Autrefois"	1919, rev. 1920	Op. 96b	S, S, orch.	H. Procopé	(Note: In 1919, Sibelius wrote Autrefois as the second of the Op. 96 Three Pieces; although it is scored for two sopranos and orchestra, two clarinets may substitute if no vocalists are available. In 1920 made minor revisions for publication; at this time, he also arranged the piece for solo piano (with text written above the music), as well as for two sopranos and piano.)
Orch. song	"Kullervon valitus" ("Kullervo's Lament"), from Kullervo	[1892, arr. 1892–1893, 1917–1918], arr. 1957	→ Op. 7	B, orch.	Kalevala, Runo XXXV	
Orch. song	"Kom nu hit, död" ("Come Away, Death")	[1909], arr. 1957	→ Op. 60/1	B, str. + harp	W. Shakespeare – C.A. Hagberg, trans. (sv)	(Note: In 1909, Sibelius wrote two songs for a Swedish-language production of Shakespeare's Twelfth Night: "Kom nu hit, död" ("Come Away, Death") and "Hållilå, uti storm och i regn" ("Hey, Ho, the Wind and the Rain"). While each song was originally for voice and guitar, Sibelius arranged them for voice and piano in 1909. In 1957, he arranged "Kom nu hit, död" for baritone and orchestra.)
Misc. (– voice)	Overture in E major	1891	JS 145	orch.	–	(Note: Initially, Sibelius intended the Overture in E major (JS 145) and Ballet Scene (JS 163) as movements I and II, respectively, in a symphony; however, he abandoned this plan in April 1891.)
Misc. (– voice)	Ballet Scene (Scène de ballet)	1891	JS 163	orch.	–	
Misc. (– voice)	Fencing Music (Fäktmusik)	1891 (lost)	JS 80	orch. (probable)	–	(Note: This early orchestral work by Sibelius has not survived.)
Misc. (– voice)	Circus March (Zirkusmarsch)	1891 (lost)	JS 223	orch. (probable)	–	
Misc. (– voice)	Karelia Overture	[1893], arr. 1893	Op. 10	orch.	–	(Note: Extended title is Music for a Lottery Soireé in Aid of Education in the Province of Viipuri; reconstructed individually by Kalevi Aho and Jouni Kaipainen; the composer excerpted the overture as Op. 10 and arranged tableau No. 4 and the two intermezzi into the Op. 11 suite; tableau No. 8 includes the composer's arrangement of the Finnish national anthem, Maamme (Our Land).)
Misc. (– voice)	Karelia Suite: 1. Intermezzo; 2. Ballade; 3. Alla marcia	[1893], arr. 1893	Op. 11	orch.	–	
Misc. (– voice)	Presto, from the String Quartet in B♭ major	[1890], arr. 1894	→ Op. 4/3	str.	–	(Note: The String Quartet B♭ major—Sibelius's third—is in four movements. In 1894, Sibelius arranged Movement III for strings and titled it Presto (also known as Scherzo). Musicologists have speculated: first, that the Adagio in D minor (JS 12) may have been intended as a slow movement for the Op. 4 quartet; and second, that the Allegretto in B♭ major (without catalogue number) may be an abandoned sketch.)
Misc. (– voice)	Impromptu, from the Six Impromptus	[1893], arr. 1894	→ Op. 5/5–6	str.	–	(Note: In 1893, Sibelius reused themes from Nights of Jealousy—a melodrama for narrator, vocalise soprano, and piano trio–for Nos. 5–6 of the Six Impromptus for solo piano (Op. 5). In 1894, he combined the fifth and sixth impromptus in an arrangement for strings and titled the new piece Impromptu.)
Misc. (– voice)	Menuetto	1894	JS 127	orch.	–	(Note: Although the Menuetto dates to 1894, Sibelius subsequently revised and shortened the piece for inclusion as No. 3 in the King Christian II incidental music (Op. 27).)
Misc. (– voice)	Coronation March (Kröningsmarsch), from the Cantata for the Coronation of Nicholas II	[1896], arr. 1896	→ JS 104	orch.	–	
Misc. (– voice)	Music for the Press Celebrations Days (Musiikkia Sanomalehdistön päivien juhlanäytäntöön): 1. Preludio; 2. Tableau I: Väinämöinen Delights Nature, and the Peoples of Kalevala and Pohjola, with His Song (Väinämöinen ilahduttaa laulullaan luontoa, Kalevan ja Pohjolan kansaa); 3. Tableau II: The Finns are Baptized (Suomen kansa tulee kristityksi); 4. Tableau III: Scene from Duke Johan's Court (Juhana-herttuan hovista); 5. Tableau IV: The Finns in the Thirty Years War (Suomalaiset 30-vuotisessa sodassa); 6. Tableau V: The Great Hostility (Isonvihan aikana); 7. Tableau VI: Finland Awakes (Suomi herää)	1899	JS 137	orch.	–	(Note: Sibelius wrote the Press Celebrations Music to raise money for the Press Pension Fund. (This purpose, however, served as a cover for the actual cause: to support a free Finnish press, which had suffered censorship under the Tsar's February Manifesto.) Sibelius's music introduced dramatic tableaux by Kaarlo Bergbom, with declaimed verses by Eino Leino and Jalmari Finne. Sibelius later arranged tableaux Nos. 1, 3, and 4 as Scènes historiques I (Op. 25) and tableau No. 6 as Finlandia (Op. 26).)
Misc. (– voice)	March of the Pori Regiment (Porilaisten marssi), arrangement [II] of the original	arr. 1900	JS 152	orch.	–	(Note: Sibelius twice arranged the well-known Swedish/Finnish song March of the Pori Regiment: first, in 1892 for a chamber ensemble with unknown scoring ("piccolo, violin, viola, and a couple other instruments"), which was performed for the unveiling of the Finnish painter Albert Edelfelt's painting of the same name; and second, as an orchestral encore piece for the Helsinki Philharmonic Society's 1900 European tour. The 1892 arrangement is lost.)
Misc. (– voice)	Overture in A minor	1902	JS 144	orch.	–	(Note: Sibelius's fourth (and only mature) string quartet, Voces intimae)—its earliest sketches date to 1899–1903—is in five movements, of which Movement III's (marked Adagio di molto) opening idea originated in the Adagio in E major for solo piano (JS 13); and Movement V contains a motif original to the Overture in A minor for orchestra (JS 144). Finally, a short preliminary ending for Movement V is also extant.)
Misc. (– voice)	Cassazione	1904, rev. 1905	Op. 6	orch.	–	(Note: The 1904 version is extant.)
Misc. (– voice)	Romance in C major	1904	Op. 42	str.	–	(Note: Sibelius originally entitled the piece as Andante.)
Misc. (– voice)	Musik zu einer Szene (Music to a Scene)	1904	Op. 45/2	orch.	–	(Note: Sibelius wrote Musik zu einer Szene (Music to a Scene) to accompany a tableaux. However, in 1904 he shortened and arranged the piece—now titled Dance Intermezzo—for solo piano. Later, in 1907, he orchestrated Dance Intermezzo.)
Misc. (– voice)	Dance Intermezzo (Tanssi-Intermezzo)	[1904, rev./trans. 1904], arr. 1907	Op. 45/2	orch.	–	
Misc. (– voice)	Cortège	1905	JS 54	orch.	–	
Misc. (– voice)	Pan and Echo (Pan och Echo)	1906	Op. 53	orch.	–	(Note: Originally written to accompany a tableau, Sibelius gave the subtitle to Pan and Echo of Tanzintermezzo (Dance-intermezzo). In 1907, he arranged it for solo piano.)
Misc. (– voice)	In memoriam	1909, rev. 1910	Op. 59	orch.	–	(Note: Sibelius composed this funeral march in memory of Eugen Schauman. The 1909 version is extant.)
Misc. (– voice)	Rakastava (The Lover): 1. The Lover (Rakastava); 2. The Path of the Beloved (Rakastetun tie); 3. Good Evening ... Farewell! (Hyvää iltaa ... Jää hyvästi)	[1894], arr. 1911, rev. 1912	Op. 14	str., perc.	– (Kanteletar)	(Note: In 1894, Sibelius composed Rakastava (The Lover), a three-part choral suite for tenor and male choir a cappella (JS 160a); at this time, he also made an arrangement for tenor, male choir, and strings (JS 160b), in order to assist with the premiere performance. Later, in 1898, he made a second arrangement, this time for soprano, baritone, and mixed choir a cappella (JS 160c). Finally, in 1911 while visiting Paris, he orchestrated Rakastava for strings, timpani, and triangle as his Op. 14; a revision followed in 1912 in advance of publication. The 1911 'Paris' version, however, is extant.)
Misc. (– voice)	Scènes historiques I, from the Press Celebrations Music: 1. All'Overtura; 2. Scena; 3. Festivo	[1899], arr. 1911	Op. 25	orch.	–	(Note: In 1911, Sibelius arranged tableaux Nos. 1, 4, and 3 from the Music for the Press Celebrations Days (JS 137), respectively, as All'Overtura, Scena, and Festivo.)
Misc. (– voice)	Scènes historiques II: 1. The Hunt (Metsästys); 2. Love Song (Minnelaulu); 3. At the Draw-Bridge (Nostosillalla)	1912	Op. 66	orch.	–	(Note: No. 1 is sometimes translated as The Chase. The original order of the movements was: At the Draw-Bridge, Love Song, and The Hunt.)
Misc. (– voice)	Valse lyrique	[1914, rev. 1919 & 1919], arr. 1920	Op. 96a	orch.	–	(Note: These works for solo piano comprise the Op. 75 Five Pieces (original French title: Cinq Morceaux), although the collection is more commonly referred to as The Trees due to the thematic link between the descriptive titles of the pieces. Originally, the set included six, rather than five, pieces. However, in 1919 Sibelius decided to rework both No. 5 The Spruce (Granen) and No. 6 The Lilac (Syringa) into a single ABA waltz called Valse lyrique. Dissatisfied with the result, he again separated the two pieces, revising The Spruce into its final form and refashioning The Lilac into a second version, which took the name Valse lyrique and transferred from Op. 75/6 (its deprecated catalogue number) to Op. 96/1. (The initial versions of The Spruce [HUL 0732], The Lilac, and Valse lyrique [HUL 0734] are extant.) Moreover, in 1920, Sibelius orchestrated Valse lyrique. Finally, a preliminary version of No. 3 The Aspen (Aspen, c. 1912 [HUL 0730]) is also extant.)
Misc. (– voice)	Academic March (Promootiomarssi)	1919	JS 155	orch.	–	(Note: Sibelius composed the Academic March for the University of Helsinki's degree ceremony of 1919.)
Misc. (– voice)	Valse chevaleresque	1921–1922, rev. 1922	Op. 96c	orch.	–	(Note: From late 1921 to January 1922, Sibelius worked simultaneously on the piano and orchestral versions of Valse chevaleresque, which became the third of the Op. 96 Three Pieces. Later in 1922, he revised the piece in response to its rejection by a publisher. (The original for piano [HUL 1815] is extant).)
Misc. (– voice)	Suite mignonne: 1. Petite scène; 2. Polka; 3. Épilogue	1921	Op. 98a	str. + flutes	–	(Note: In 1921, Sibelius transcribed the Suite mignonne for piano.)
Misc. (– voice)	Suite champêtre: 1. Pièce caractéristique; 2. Mélodie élégiaque; 3. Danse	1922	Op. 98b	str.	–	(Note: In 1922, Sibelius transcribed the Suite champêtre for piano.)
Misc. (– voice)	Suite caractéristique: 1. Vivo; 2. Lento; 3. Comodo	1922	Op. 100	str. + harp	–	(Note: Sibelius suggested (unsuccessfully) to a publisher that the three movements should be called Danse passionée, Danse romantique, and Danse chevaleresque, respectively. In 1922, he transcribed the Suite caractéristique for piano.)
Misc. (– voice)	Morceau romantique	1925	JS 135a	orch.	–	(Note: Sibelius composed this piece, the extended title of which is Morceau romantique sur un motif de M. Jakob de Julin, after a waltz by the industrialist Jakob von Julin, who was a relative of General Gustaf Mannerheim. Sibelius also rendered the piece for solo piano (JS 135b), which indeed may have come first.)
Misc. (– voice)	Andante festivo	[1922], arr. 1938	JS 34b	str. + timpani	–	(Note: Originally for string quartet (JS 34a), Andante festivo may have drawn some of its material from 1905's abandoned oratorio project, Marjatta. In 1929, a double string quartet played the piece at the wedding of one of Sibelius's daughters, and the piece subsequently became common for strings. However, Sibelius did not make an official orchestration until 1938.)
Misc. (+ voice)	Lord, You are a Rock (Herr du bist ein Fels)	1889–1890, rev. 1889–1890	HUL 1260	chor., orch.	[Unknown]	(Note: Sibelius's earliest surviving compositions for orchestra, the so-called [Two Chorales] for mixed choir and orchestra were student exercises for Albert Becker, with whom Sibelius studied in Berlin. For each, two versions are extant, and it is likely the second set incorporates minor revisions suggested by Becker. An unfinished version of Herr du bist ein Fels for mixed choir and piano also survives.)
Misc. (+ voice)	Lord, Show Us Your Mercy (Herr erzeige uns deine Gnade)	1889–1890, rev. 1889–1890	HUL 1263	chor., orch.	[Unknown]	(Note: Sibelius's earliest surviving compositions for orchestra, the so-called [Two Chorales] for mixed choir and orchestra were student exercises for Albert Becker, with whom Sibelius studied in Berlin. For each, two versions are extant, and it is likely the second set incorporates minor revisions suggested by Becker. An unfinished version of Herr du bist ein Fels for mixed choir and piano also survives.)
Misc. (+ voice)	Karelia: 1. Overture; 2. Tableau I: A Karelian Home – News of War (1293) (Karjalainen koti – Sanoma sodasta); 3. Tableau II: The Founding of Viipuri Castle (1293) (Viipurin linnan perustaminen); 4. Tableau III: Narimont, the Duke of Lithuania, Levying Taxes in the Province of Käkisalmi (1333) (Liettuan herttua Narimont veronkannossa Käkisalmen läänissä); 5. Intermezzo I; 6. Tableau IV: Karl Knutsson in Viipuri Castle – Ballade (1446) (Kaarle Knuutinpoika Viipurin linnassa – Balladi); 7. Tableau V: Pontus De la Gardie at the Gates of Käkisalmi in 1580 (Pontus De la Gardie Käkisalmen edustalla 1580); 8. Intermezzo II; 9. Tableau VI: The Siege of Viipuri (1710) (Viipurin piiritys); 10. Tableau VII: The Reunion of Old Finland [Karelia] with the Rest of Finland (1811) (Vanhan Suomen [Karjalan] liittäminen jälleen Suomen ruhtinaskuntaan); 11. Tableau VIII: Maamme (Our Land) [the Finnish national anthem]	1893 (partially destroyed)	JS 115	B, 2 male folk singers, orch.	Kalevala, Runo XIV; Svenska fornsånger, Vol. II	
Misc. (+ voice)	Rakastava (The Lover): 1. "Rakastava" ("The Lover"); 2. "Rakastetun tie" ("The Path of the Beloved"); 3. "Hyvää iltaa ... Jää hyvästi" ("Good Evening ... Farewell!")	[1894], arr. 1894	JS 160b	T, mchor., str.	Kanteletar, Book I:173–74, 122	
Misc. (+ voice)	A Song for Lemminkäinen (Laulu Lemminkäiselle)	[1895–1896], arr. 1896	Op. 31/1	mchor., orch.	Y. Weilin	
Misc. (+ voice)	Sandels	1898, rev. 1915	Op. 28	mchor., orch.	J.L. Runeberg	(Note: In 1915, Sibelius made very minor revisions to Sandels; the 1898 version—of which Sibelius also made a transcription for male choir and piano—is extant.)
Misc. (+ voice)	Song of the Athenians (Athenarnes sång)	1899	Op. 31/3	mchor., bchor., orch.	V. Rydberg	(Note: Originally for male choir, boys' choir, and small orchestra, Sibelius made numerous arrangements of the Song of the Athenians in 1899: for solo piano; for male choir and boys' choir a cappella; for male choir, boys' choir, and piano; for male choir, boys' choir, piano, and ad libitum harmonium; and for male choir, boys' choir, brass septet, and percussion.)
Misc. (+ voice)	Impromptu	1902, rev. 1910	Op. 19	fchor., orch.	V. Rydberg	(Note: In 1910, Sibelius revised the 1902 version of the Impromptu for female choir and orchestra—which is extant—and also rendered it for female choir and piano. A transcription of the 1902 version for female choir and piano is extant.)
Misc. (+ voice)	Have You Courage? (Har du mod?)	1904, rev. 1911, 1912, & 1913–1914	Op. 31/2	mchor., orch.	J.J. Wecksell	(Note: Sibelius composed Have You Courage? (Har du mod?, Op. 31/2) for male choir and orchestra in 1904 [version I]; at this time, he also made an arrangement for male choir and piano. Unsatisfied with the piece, however, Sibelius revised the orchestral version of Have You Courage? three more times: in 1911 [version II; also arranged for male choir and piano]; 1912 [version III]; and 1914 [version IV], which is based likely on a 1913 transcription/revision of version III for solo piano (with text written above the music). All versions are extant. A preliminary study of Wecksell's poem for male choir a capella (JS 93) dates to 1903–1904; its thematic material is completely different from that of Op. 31/2.)
Misc. (+ voice)	Jäger March (Jääkärien marssi)	[1917], arr. 1918	→ Op. 91a	mchor., orch.	H. Nurmio	(Note: The extended title of the Jäger March is March of the Finnish Jäger Battalion. Originally composed in 1917 for male choir and piano, Sibelius initially withheld his name from the first edition of the work. In 1918, he arranged the Jäger March for male choir and orchestra.)
Misc. (+ voice)	Scout March (Partiolaisten marssi)	[1918], arr. 1918	→ Op. 91b	chor., orch.	J. Finne	(Note: Originally composed in 1918 for piano (with the text written above the music), Sibelius later—likely in 1918 but perhaps as late as 1921—arranged the Scout March for mixed choir and orchestra. Two additional arrangements followed: in 1921, for mixed choir and piano; and in 1952, for female choir and piano, retitled as "The World Song of the World Association of Girl Scouts and Girl Guides" and set to either an English-language text by Gavin Ewart or a French-language text by Francine Cockenpot. Finally, the origins of the Scout March have been traced to a sketch—[March], with an incomplete percussion part—for brass septet and percussion from the 1897–1899.)
Misc. (+ voice)	Processional, from the Masonic Ritual Music	[1927], arr. 1938	→ Op. 113/6	chor., orch.	V. Rydberg – M. Kernochan, trans. (en)	(Note: In 1927, Sibelius wrote music for the masonic lodge he had joined in 1922: Musique religieuse, for tenor and harmonium (Op. 113), of which No. 6–Salem–was set to words by Viktor Rydberg. A non-Sibelius arrangement for mixed choir and harmonium appeared in 1929, with Marshall Kernochan translating Rydberg's poem to English as Onward, Ye Brethren (or Onward, Ye Peoples) and Channing Lefebvre covering the original tenor part for choir. In 1938, Sibelius added to the Kernochan–Lefebvre collaboration an orchestral arrangement that replaced the harmonium and renamed the piece Processional. The piece can also be performed by orchestra alone by omitting the choral part (which the orchestra doubles).)
Misc. (+ voice)	"Koskenlaskijan morsiamet" ("The Rapids-Rider's Brides")	[1897], arr. 1943	→ Op. 33	mchor., orch.	A. Oksanen	
=== Chamber works ===					(↑ to top)	
Stage	Ljunga Wirginia: 1. Moderato quasi andantino – Cantabile – Recitativo; 2. Prestissimo; 3. Largo; 4. Andantino; 5. Allegretto; 6. Allegro – Più vivo quasi Presto – Allegro con fuoco – [Moderato]	1885 (partially survives)	HUL 0542–46	pf. (4-hands), vl., vc.	W. von Konow	(Note: Ljunga Wirginia (without catalogue number), which a young Sibelius called an "opera", is his earliest surviving attempt at dramatic music. The project was a collaboration between Sibelius and his childhood friend, Walter von Konow. Although the latter's libretto is lost, Movements I–V of Sibelius six-movement score are extant, as well as the violin part for Movement VI; no vocal parts, if ever written, have survived. Two years later in 1887, Sibelius and von Konow briefly revived their plans for the opera, with Sibelius producing a new piece, the Scherzo in E minor (JS 165), which only partially survives. Kalevi Aho has completed the piano and cello parts of Ljunga Wirginia's sixth movement, as well as (with Timo Hongisto) the Scherzo in E minor.)
Stage	Scherzo in E minor	1887 (partially survives)	JS 165	pf. (4-hands), vl., vc.	W. von Konow	
Stage	The Lizard (Ödlan): 1. Adagio – Più adagio; 2. Grave – Adagio	1909	Op. 8	vl. solo, 2 vl., va., vc., db.	– (M. Lybeck)	(Note: A chamber piece, Sibelius noted that the string ensemble for The Lizard should be no more than nine players, the violin soloist included. Nevertheless, it has been recorded by full string orchestra.)
Melodrama	The Watersprite (Näcken) in A♭ major	1888	JS 138	Nar., S, pf., vl., vc.	G. Wennerberg	(Note: In 1888, Sibelius collaborated with his teacher, Martin Wegelius on the incidental music for a "dramatic runic sorcery" titled The Watersprite (Näcken); Wegelius composed Nos. 1 and 3–6, while Sibelius wrote No. 2. A separate fragment for piano trio—[Allegretto] in A♭ major (without catalogue number)—may have served as a preliminary version of Sibelius's piece.)
Melodrama	Nights of Jealousy (Svartsjukans nätter)	1893	JS 125	Nar., S (voc.), pf., vl., vc.	J.L. Runeberg	
Brass septet	Overture in F minor	1889	JS 146	torviseitsikko	–	
Brass septet	Allegro in G minor	1889	JS 25	torviseitsikko, perc.	–	
Brass septet	Andantino	1890	JS 45	torviseitsikko	–	
Brass septet	Menuetto	1890	JS 45	torviseitsikko	–	
Brass septet	Preludium (Förspel)	1891	JS 83	torviseitsikko, perc.	–	
Brass septet	Tiera	1899	JS 200	torviseitsikko, perc.	– (Kalevala)	
Brass septet	Song of the Athenians (Athenarnes sång)	1899	→ Op. 31/3	mchor., bchor., torviseitsikko, perc.	V. Rydberg	
Quintet	Andante – Allegro	1888–1889	JS 31	pf., 2 vl., va., vc.	–	(Note: Sibelius's earliest surviving piece for piano quintet, the Andante – Allegro (which "comprises a complete sonata exposition") may have been a student exercise completed under the guidance of this teacher, Martin Wegelius.)
Quintet	[Vivace]	1890	HUL 0517	pf., 2 vl., va., vc.	–	(Note: The Piano Quintet in G minor is in five movements. When composing the piece, Sibelius replaced his original Movement IV (marked Vivace) with a Scherzo (Vivacissimo); the earlier Vivace is extant. At neither of the two concerts at which the quintet was played was it heard in its entirety; Movement V went unperformed until 1965. As a result, Sibelius rescued themes from the quintet's finale by reusing them for the Rondo in D minor (JS 162) for viola and piano duo, as well as the first of the Six Impromptus (Op. 5/1) for solo piano.)
Quintet	Piano Quintet in G minor: 1. Grave – Allegro; 2. Intermezzo. Moderato; 3. Andante; 4. Scherzo. Vivacissimo; 5. Moderato – Vivace	1890	JS 159	pf., 2 vl., va., vc.	–	
Quartet	Piano Quartet in D minor: 1. Andante molto – Allegro moderato; 2. Adagio; 3. Menuetto; 4. Grave – Rondo. Vivacissimo	1884	JS 157	pf., vl., va., vc.	–	(Note: In 1884, Sibelius composed the four-movement Piano Quartet in D minor, which is in "an essentially Viennese classical style". Movement IV of the quartet contains material that Sibelius initially intended for a fourth movement to the Piano Trio in A minor (JS 206) he had written a few months earlier; the Piano Trio ended up in three movements.)
Quartet	Molto moderato – Scherzo	1885	JS 134	2 vl., va., vc.	–	(Note: The String Quartet in E♭ major—Sibelius's first—is in four movements. It appears in the same sketchbook as two other brief pieces for string quartet: first, the Molto moderato – Scherzo (JS 134), which is Sibelius's earliest piece in the genre; and second, a fragmentary [Scherzo] in B minor (without catalogue marking; completed by Kalevi Aho).)
Quartet	String Quartet in E♭ major: 1. Allegro; 2. Andante molto; 3. Scherzo. Allegretto; 4. Vivace	1885	JS 184	2 vl., va., vc.	–	
Quartet	Harmonium Quartet in G minor	1887	JS 158	harmonium, pf., vl., vc.	–	(Note: The Harmonium Quartet in G minor is in one movement and shares a theme with the [Catalogue of Themes, 50 Short Pieces], a composition exercise for solo piano that Sibelius completed for his teacher, Martin Wegelius.)
Quartet	[Four Themes]	1887	HUL 0796/2	2 vl., va., vc.	–	(Note: At the Helsinki Music Institute, Sibelius studied under Martin Wegelius, the teaching method of whom had pupils master the smallest of compositional units before advancing to longer, more complex ones. Among Sibelius's student exercises for Wegelius are a handful of short pieces for string quartet: the [Four Themes]—in G major, E♭ major, A minor, and E minor–(without catalogue number), Alla Marcia in E minor (JS 16), the Presto in F major (JS 154), the Theme and Variations in G minor (JS 197), and the [Thirty-three Small Pieces] (without catalogue number).)
Quartet	Alla marcia in E minor	1888	JS 16	2 vl., va., vc.	–	
Quartet	Presto in F major	1888	JS 154	2 vl., va., vc.	–	
Quartet	Theme and Variations in G minor	1888	JS 197	2 vl., va., vc.	–	
Quartet	Allegretto in D major	1888	JS 20	2 vl., va., vc.	–	
Quartet	Andantino in C major	1888	JS 39	2 vl., va., vc.	–	(Note: From 1887–1888, Sibelius planned a melodrama for narrator and string quartet after Hans Christian Andersen's The Little Mermaid (JS 59). Envisioned as a series of musical episodes, Sibelius only made it through four sections before abandoning the project. Although only the first violin part survives for the first four episodes, it makes clear that he had planned to reuse earlier chamber works: the second episode corresponds to the Allegretto in A major (JS 17) and Più lento in F major (JS 149), while the third episode is based on the Andantino in C major (JS 39). The first episode, as well as the brief fourth, are original compositions.)
Quartet	Theme and Variations in C♯ minor	1888 (partially survives)	JS 195	2 vl., va., vc.	–	(Note: Until 1911, Sibelius listed the Theme and Variations in C♯ minor for string quartet as his Op. 1. The piece only partially survives, having lost five bars at the beginning of Variation III, although Kalevi Aho has made a performing version. (It is possible, however, that one or more complete variations, too, are lost.))
Quartet	[Thirty-three Small Pieces]	1888–1889	HUL 0618	2 vl., va., vc.	–	
Quartet	Moderato – Allegro appassionato in C♯ minor	1888–1889	JS 131	2 vl., va., vc.	–	(Note: Sibelius composed the Moderato – Allegro appassionato in C♯ minor (JS 131), the Andante molto sostenuto in B minor (JS 37), the Andante – Allegro molto in D major (JS 32), and the [Allegro] in G minor (without catalogue number)—each for string quartet—as student exercises under the direction of his teacher, Martin Wegelius.)
Quartet	Andante molto sostenuto in B minor	1888–1889	JS 37 (fragment)	2 vl., va., vc.	–	
Quartet	Andante – Allegro molto in D major	1888–1889	JS 32	2 vl., va., vc.	–	
Quartet	[Allegro] in G minor	1888–1889	HUL 0620	2 vl., va., vc.	–	
Quartet	Allegro in E minor	1888–1889	JS 28	2 vl., va., vc.	–	
Quartet	Adagio in F minor	1888–1889	JS 14	2 vl., va., vc.	–	
Quartet	Allegretto in A major	1888–1889	JS 17	2 vl., va., vc.	–	
Quartet	Più lento in F major	1888–1889	JS 149	2 vl., va., vc.	–	
Quartet	Fugue for Martin W. (Fuga för Martin W.)	1889	JS 85	2 vl., va., vc.	–	(Note: The String Quartet in A minor—Sibelius's second—is in four movements. The initial finale was the Fugue (JS 85) that Sibelius had written as an academic exercise under the direction of his teacher, Martin Wegelius. It was subsequently replaced by the concluding Allegro.)
Quartet	String Quartet in A minor: 1. Andante – Allegro; 2. Adagio ma non tanto; 3. Vivace; 4. Allegro	1889	JS 183	2 vl., va., vc.	–	
Quartet	Allegretto in B♭ major	1889	HUL 0621	2 vl., va., vc.	–	
Quartet	String Quartet in B♭ major: 1. Allegro; 2. Andante sostenuto; 3. Presto; 4. Allegro	1889–1890	Op. 4	2 vl., va., vc.	–	
Quartet	Adagio in D minor	1890	JS 12	2 vl., va., vc.	–	
Quartet	Piano Quartet in C minor	1891 (partially survives)	JS 156	pf., vl., va., vc.	–	(Note: In 1891, Sibelius composed the Theme and Variations in C minor for solo piano (JS 198), and later that year, he expanded it into the single-movement Piano Quartet in C minor (JS 156). Neither JS 198 nor the piano part to JS 156 have survived.)
Quartet	String Quartet, Voces intimae, in D minor: 1. Andante – Allegro molto moderato; 2. Vivace; 3. Adagio di molto; 4. Allegretto (ma pesante); 5. Allegro	1908–1909	Op. 56	2 vl., va., vc.	–	
Quartet	Andante festivo	1922	JS 34a	2 vl., va., vc.	–	
Trio	[Menuetto] in D minor	c. 1882–1885	HUL 0538	pf., vl., vc.	–	(Note: Scholars believe the [Menuetto] in D minor (without catalogue number) to be Sibelius's earliest surviving piece for piano trio, although it cannot be date with precision.)
Trio	Trio in 'G major': 1. Andante – Allegro; 2. Adagio; 3. Vivace	1883	JS 205	pf., 2 vl.	–	(Note: In 1883, Sibelius wrote the three-movement Trio (JS 205) for piano and two violins, the first movement of which is only partially in G major, the key he assigned the piece. A second piece from this time, the Menuetto in F major (JS 126) may have been intended as a fourth movement to JS 205 or, perhaps, as a movement for a never-realized second trio.)
Trio	Menuetto in F major	1883	JS 126	pf., 2 vl.	–	
Trio	[Andante] – Adagio – Allegro maestoso	c. 1883–1885	HUL 0539	pf., vl., vc.	–	(Note: The [Andante] – Adagio – Allegro maestoso (without catalogue number), an early work by Sibelius for piano trio, cannot be dated with precision.)
Trio	Piano Trio in A minor: 1. Allegro con brio; 2. Andante; 3. Menuetto	1884	JS 206	pf., vl., vc.	–	
Trio	Allegro in D major	1886	JS 27	pf., vl., vc.	–	
Trio	Piano Trio, Hafträsk, in A minor: 1. Allegro maestoso; 2. Andantino; 3. Scherzo. Vivace; 4. Rondo	1886	JS 207	pf., vl., vc.	–	(Note: The Piano Trio in A minor, Hafträsk—Sibelius's second—is in four movements. Immediately upon its completion, he substantially revised the first movement; this revised version, however, is fragmentary, although the cello part is complete. The trio derives its nickname from the small village of Hafträsk (on Norrskata, an island located in the Turku archipelago), at which the Sibelius family summered in 1886.)
Trio	Serenata in D minor	1887	JS 169	2 vl., vc.	–	(Note: Scholars have speculated that Sibelius may have originally intended the Serenata in D minor (JS 169) and the Minuet – Allegro (JS 128), each for two violins and cello, as a single, multi-movement work.)
Trio	Minuet and Allegro	1887	JS 128	2 vl., vc.	–	
Trio	Piano Trio, Korpo, in D major: 1. Allegro moderato; 2. Fantasia. Andante – Andantino –; 3. Finale. Vivace	1887	JS 209	pf., vl., vc.	–	(Note: The Piano Trio in D major, Korpo—Sibelius's third, and most significant, trio—is in three movements. The trio derives its nickname from Korpo (an island located in the Turku archipelago), at which the Sibelius family summered in 1887.)
Trio	Andantino in G minor	1887	JS 43	pf., vl., vc.	–	(Note: The Andantino in G minor (JS 43) cannot be dated with precision; the manuscript paper hints that it was composed around the same time as the Korpo piano trio (JS 209).)
Trio	[Allegretto] in A♭ major	c. 1887–1888	HUL 0547	pf., vl., vc.	–	
Trio	Piano Trio, Lovisa, in C major: 1. Allegro; 2. Andante; 3. Lento – Allegro con brio	1888	JS 208	pf., vl., vc.	–	(Note: The Piano Trio in C major, Lovisa—Sibelius's fourth—is in three movements. The trio derives its nickname from Lovisa, the municipality in which the composer's aunt (and, before her death, his paternal grandmother) lived; Sibelius summered there in 1888.)
Trio	Suite in A major: 1. Prélude. Vivace; 2. Andante con moto; 3. Menuetto; 4. Air. Andante sostenuto; 5. Gigue. Allegretto	1889 (partially survives)	JS 186	pf., vl., vc.	–	(Note: In 1889, Sibelius wrote the five-movement Suite in A major (JS 186) for piano trio; the violin part to Movement IV is lost. Scholars have speculated that Sibelius may have initially intended a second piece, the Andantino in A major (JS 38), as the suite's first movement. In 1911, Sibelius sought to publish (and made minor revisions to) the first three movements and provisionally labeled them as his Op. 1; however, the piece did not appear in print.)
Trio	Andantino in A major	1889	JS 38	pf., vl., vc.	–	(Note: JS 38/186)
Trio	La pompeuse Marche d'Asis	1891 (other arrangements lost)	JS 116	pf., vl., vc.	–	(Note: In February 1891, Sibelius composed La pompeuse Marche d'Asis (JS 116) at the request of his brother, Christian Sibelius, who was a medical student at the Anatomical Institute of Helsinki University (ASIS). The piece appears to have been originally for string quartet (this version is lost). In November, Sibelius arranged the it for piano, two violins, and cello (this, too, is lost), as well as for piano trio (the only extant version).)
Duo	Water Droplets (Vattendroppar)	c. 1875–1881	JS 216	vl., vc. (pizz.)	–	(Note: Vattendroppar is believed to be Sibelius's earliest surviving work, although it cannot be dated with precision.)
Duo	Castles in the Air (Luftslott)	c. 1881	JS 65	2 vl.	–	(Note: Luftslott–a duo for two violins–is believed to be Sibelius's second earliest surviving work (and the earliest surviving autograph manuscript), although it cannot be dated with precision.)
Duo	Violin Sonata in A minor: 1. Un poco lento – Più mosso quasi presto; 2. Andantino; 3. Tempo di menuetto; 4. Rondo. Presto	1884	JS 177	vl., pf.	–	
Duo	Andantino in C major	1884	JS 40	vc., pf.	–	
Duo	Andante grazioso in D major	1884–1885	JS 35	vl., pf.	–	
Duo	[Moderato] – Presto – Tempo I in A minor	1886	JS 7	vl., pf.	–	
Duo	[Andantino] in A minor	1886–1887	JS 8	vl., pf.	–	
Duo	[Tempo di valse] in B minor	1886–1887	JS 89 (fragment)	vl., pf.	–	(Note: Fragmentary; completed by Jaakko Kuusisto.)
Duo	[Mazurka] in A major	1886–1887	JS 4	vl., pf.	–	
Duo	[Andante molto] in C major	1886–1887	JS 49	vl., pf.	–	
Duo	[Aubade] in A major	1886–1887	JS 3	vl., pf.	–	
Duo	[Menuetto] in E minor	1886–1887	JS 67	vl., pf.	–	
Duo	[Scherzino] in F major	1886–1887	JS 78	vl., pf.	–	
Duo	[Allegretto] in G major	1886–1887, rev. 1886–1887	JS 86	vl., pf.	–	(Note: A premilimary version of the [Allegretto] in G major (JS 86) is extant.)
Duo	[Duo] in E minor	1887	JS 68	vl., vc.	–	
Duo	Andante cantabile in E♭ major	1887	JS 30b	harmonium, pf.	–	
Duo	Andante cantabile in G major	1887	JS 33	vl., pf.	–	
Duo	Andante molto in F minor	1887	JS 36	vc., pf.	–	
Duo	Tempo di valse in G minor	1887 (partially survives)	JS 193	vc., pf.	–	(Note: Piano part is lost, but was reconstructed by Kalevi Aho in 2006.)
Duo	[Sonata Allegro Exposition] in B minor	1887	JS 90	vl., pf.	–	
Duo	Suite in D minor: 1. Un poco adagio – Andante; 2. Vivace; 3. Andantino; 4. Vivacissimo; 5. Moderato; 6. Quasi presto	1887–1888	JS 187	vl., pf.	–	(Note: Sometimes referred to as Sonata in D minor.)
Duo	[Lento] in E♭ minor	1887–1888	JS 76	vl. (or vc.), pf.	–	
Duo	Moderato – Maestoso in E♭ major	1887–1888	JS 132	vl., pf.	–	
Duo	Allegretto in C major	1888	JS 19	vl., pf.	–	
Duo	Allegretto in E♭ major	1888	JS 22	vl., pf.	–	
Duo	Suite in E major: 1. Allegro molto moderato – Quasi adagio; 2. Allegro molto; 3. Più lento quasi andantino; 4. Allegro brillante	1888	JS 188	vl., pf.	–	
Duo	[Andante] in B minor	1888	JS 91 (fragment)	vc., pf.	–	
Duo	[Andantino] in B minor	1888–1889	JS 92 (fragment)	vc., pf.	–	
Duo	Allegro [Sonata Exposition] in A minor	1888–1889	JS 26	vl., pf.	–	
Duo	Canon in G minor	1889	JS 50	vl., vc.	–	
Duo	Violin Sonata in F major: 1. [Allegro]; 2. Andante; 3. Vivace	1889	JS 178	vl., pf.	–	
Duo	Adagio in F♯ minor	1889	JS 15	vc., pf.	–	
Duo	Tempo di valse (Lulu Waltz) in F♯ minor	1889	JS 194	vc., pf.	–	
Duo	Fantasy: 1. Moderato; 2. Tempo di valse moderato; 3. Alla polacca; 4. Alla marcia –; 5. Leggiero	1889 (partially survives)	JS 79	vc., pf.	–	(Note: Piano part lost.)
Duo	Romance in B minor	1890, rev. 1911	Op. 2/1	vl., pf.	–	(Note: In 1890–1891, Sibelius composed two duos for violin and piano, the Romance in B minor and Perpetuum mobile, each of which was first printed in a Finnish periodical. In 1911, he substantially revised these pieces as his Op. 2 and sold them to a publisher; at this time, he changed the title of Perpetuum mobile to Epilogue.)
Duo	Epilog (Epilogue)	1891, rev. 1911	Op. 2/2	vl., pf.	–	
Duo	Duo in C major	1891–1892	JS 66	vl., va.	–	(Note: In 1891, Sibelius worked on Kullervo (Op. 7) in Lovisa and gave private violin lessons. Scholars believe he composed the Duo in C major (JS 66) for violin and viola for these teaching purposes, with him playing the latter and his pupil(s) playing the former.)
Duo	Rondo in D minor	1893	JS 162	va., pf.	–	
Duo	Lullaby (Kehtolaulu)	1899	JS 222	kantele, vl.	–	(Note: In September 1899, while visiting the Finnish painter Pekka Halonen, Sibelius wrote the Lullaby (also known as Waltz or Waltzer) for kantele and violin. It makes use of a folk song that Halonen had played on the kantele and to which Sibelius then wrote a violin accompaniment.)
Duo	Malinconia (Melancholy)	1900	Op. 20	vc., pf.	–	(Note: Malinconia (Op. 20) premiered under the provisional title Fantasia.)
Duo	Violin Sonatina in E major: 1. Lento – Allegro; 2. Andantino; 3. Lento – Allegretto	1915	Op. 80	vl., pf.	–	(Note: The main theme of the Op. 80 Violin Sonatina's third movement was originally intended for the Sixth Symphony (Op. 104).)
Duo	Mazurka in D minor	1915	Op. 81/1	vl., pf.	–	(Note: These works comprise the Op. 81 Five Pieces for violin and piano.)
Duo	Souvenir in D major	1915	Op. 79/1	vl., pf.	–	(Note: These works comprise the Op. 79 Six Pieces for violin and piano.)
Duo	Tempo di Minuetto	1915	Op. 79/2	vl., pf.	–	
Duo	Impromptu in A minor	1915	Op. 78/1	vl. (or vc.), pf.	–	(Note: These works comprise the Op. 78 Four Pieces for violin (or cello) and piano. The original version of Romance (No. 2) is extant.)
Duo	Rigaudon in D major	1915	Op. 78/4	vl. (or vc.), pf.	–	
Duo	Romance in F major	1915, rev. 1915	Op. 78/2	vl. (or vc.), pf.	–	
Duo	Danse caractéristique	1916	Op. 79/3	vl., pf.	–	
Duo	Sérénade in D major	1916	Op. 79/4	vl., pf.	–	
Duo	Dance Idyll (Tanz-Idylle) in E minor	1917	Op. 79/5	vl., pf.	–	
Duo	Berceuse in C♯ minor	1917	Op. 79/6	vl., pf.	–	
Duo	Religioso in G minor	1917	Op. 78/3	vl. (or vc.), pf.	–	
Duo	Rondino in D major	1917	Op. 81/2	vl., pf.	–	
Duo	Valse in D major	1917	Op. 81/3	vl., pf.	–	
Duo	Aubade in D major	1918	Op. 81/4	vl., pf.	–	
Duo	Menuetto in D minor	1918	Op. 81/5	vl., pf.	–	
Duo	Novellette	1922	Op. 102	vl., pf.	–	(Note: In 1922, Sibelius planned to write a new series of pieces for violin and piano; however, he ended up only composing one piece: the Op. 102 Novellette.)
Duo	Danse champêtre No. 1	1924	Op. 106/1	vl., pf.	–	(Note: These works comprise the Op. 106 five Danses Champêtres for violin and piano.)
Duo	Danse champêtre No. 2	1924	Op. 106/2	vl., pf.	–	
Duo	Danse champêtre No. 3	1925	Op. 106/3	vl., pf.	–	
Duo	Danse champêtre No. 4	1925	Op. 106/4	vl., pf.	–	
Duo	Danse champêtre No. 5	1925	Op. 106/5	vl., pf.	–	
Duo	On the Heath (Auf der Heide)	1929	Op. 115/1	vl., pf.	–	(Note: These works comprise the Op. 115 Four Pieces for violin and piano.)
Duo	Ballad (Ballade)	1929	Op. 115/2	vl., pf.	–	
Duo	Humoresque	1929	Op. 115/3	vl., pf.	–	
Duo	The Bells (Die Glocken)	1929	Op. 115/4	vl., pf.	–	
Duo	Scène de danse	1929	Op. 116/1	vl., pf.	–	(Note: These works comprise the Op. 116 Three Pieces for violin and piano.)
Duo	Danse caractéristique	1929	Op. 116/2	vl., pf.	–	
Duo	Rondeau romantique	1929	Op. 116/3	vl., pf.	–	
Duo	To My Beloved Aino (Rakkaalle Ainolle)	1931	JS 161	pf. (4-hands)	–	
Duo (trans.)	Violin Concerto in D minor: 1. Allegro moderato; 2. Adagio di molto; 3. Allegro (ma non tanto)	[1903–1904, rev. 1905], trans. 1905	Op. 47	vl., pf.	–	
Duo (trans.)	Serious Melody No. 1: Cantique	[1914 (arr. 1916)], trans. 1915 (1916)	Op. 77/1	vl. (or vc.), pf.	–	
Duo (trans.)	Serious Melody No. 2: Devotion	[1915 (arr. 1916)], trans. 1915 (1916)	Op. 77/2	vl. (or vc.), pf.	–	
Duo (trans.)	Scène d'amour (Love Scene), from Scaramouche	[1913], trans. 1925	Op. 71	vl., pf.	–	
=== Works for solo instrument ===					(↑ to top)	
Carillon	The Bells of Kallio Church (Kallion kirkon kellosävel)	1912	JS 102	carillon	–	(Note: In 1912, Sibelius composed The Bells of Kallio Church (JS 102) for the new building's September consecration. For this occasion, Heikki Klemetti made a choral arrangement of Sibelius's melody without the composer's blessing. Later in the year, Sibelius arranged his piece for solo piano, as well as for mixed choir a cappella (each is Op. 65b).)
Cello	[Theme and Variations] in D minor	1887	JS 196	cello	–	
Cello	Moderato in F major	1885–1889	HUL 1351	cello	–	
Cello	[Mazurka] in G minor	1887–1889	–	cello	–	
Kantele	Moderato	1896–1898	JS 130	kantele	–	(Note: Sibelius composed two pieces for solo kantele—Moderato and Dolicissimo—as a souvenir for his sister-in-law, the amateur kanetele player Aili Järnefelt, who had been badly injured railway accident. The pieces were unknown until 1989 and are part of the manuscripts collection at the Sibelius Museum.)
Kantele	Dolicissimo	1896–1898	JS 63	kantele	–	
Organ	Intrada	1925	Op. 111a	organ	–	(Note: These works for organ comprise the Op. 111 Two Pieces. Intrada exists in both a version for single pedal and double pedal [HUL 0828]; a brief sketch [HUL 0052] is extant. Moreover, both a preliminary version and a provisional alternative [each HUL 1893] of Mournful Music (Surusoitto) are also extant.)
Organ	Preludium	1926	JS 153/1	organ	–	(Note: These works for organ comprise the so-called [Two Pieces] (JS 153).)
Organ	Postludium	1926	JS 153/2	organ	–	
Organ	Mournful Music (Surusoitto)	1931	Op. 111b	organ	–	
Organ	Theme for Improvisation	1933	–	organ	–	
Violin	[Étude] in D major	1886	JS 55	violin	–	
Violin	[Allegretto] in A major	1891–1894	HUL 1088/2	violin	–	
Violin	A Happy Musician (En glad musikant)	1924–1926	JS 70	violin	T. Rangström	(Note: Text written above the music.)
Melodrama	To Longing (Trånaden): 1. Two Laws Govern Human Life ... (Tvenne lagar styta menniskolifvet ...); 2. Do You See the Sea? (Ser du hafvet?); 3. Do You Hear the Wind? (Hör du vinden?); 4. What is the Spring? (Hvad är vären?); 5. Mankind, Do You Wish to Learn ... (Menska, vill du lifvets vishet lära ...)	1887	JS 203	Nar., piano	E.J. Stagnelius	(Note: Sibelius gave to Trånaden the subtitle "fantasy". It is unknown whether he intended Stagnelius's poem to be spoken before or during the playing of each piano number, although Erik Tawaststjerna has suggested—and recordings have utilized—the former (alternation between recitation and music).)
Melodrama	Oh, If You Had Seen (O, om du sett)	1888	JS 141	Nar., piano	E. Hackzell	(Note: As a souvenir for a friend, Ellen Hackzell, Sibelius wrote a melodrama setting her poem Oh, If You Had Seen. The recitation is intended to alternate with the piano music.)
Melodrama	A Lonely Ski-Trail (Ett ensamt skidspår)	1925	JS 77a	Nar., piano	B. Gripenberg	
Piano (orig.)	Con moto, sempre una corda in D♭ major	1885	JS 52	piano	–	(Note: The Con moto, sempre una corda in D♭ major (JS 52, 1885) is believed to Sibelius's earliest surviving piece for solo piano.)
Piano (orig.)	[Andante] in E♭ major	1885	JS 74	piano	–	(Note: The so-called [Three Pieces] for solo piano—JS 74, 2, and 5–appear together on the same manuscript paper. They date to the autumn of 1885, around the time Sibelius had begun his studies at the Helsinki Music Institute.)
Piano (orig.)	[Menuetto] in A minor	1885	JS 5	piano	–	
Piano (orig.)	[Tempo di valse] in A major	1885	JS 2	piano	–	
Piano (orig.)	Scherzo in E major with Trio in E minor (or with [Trio] in A major)	1885, arr. 1886	JS 134a(b)	piano	–	
Piano (orig.)	Andante in E♭ major	1887	JS 30a	piano	–	
Piano (orig.)	[Aubade] in A♭ major	1887	JS 46	piano	–	
Piano (orig.)	Au crépuscule in F♯ minor	1887	JS 47	piano	–	
Piano (orig.)	Andantino in B major	1888	JS 44	piano	–	(Note: The so-called [Three Short Pieces] for solo piano—JS 44, 18, and the Allegro in F minor (without catalogue designation [HUL 0768/3])—from 1888 were likely composition exercises that Sibelius wrote for Martin Wegelius.)
Piano (orig.)	Allegretto in B♭ minor	1888	JS 18	piano	–	
Piano (orig.)	Allegro in F minor	1888	HUL 0768/3	piano	–	
Piano (orig.)	[Five Short Pieces]: * Tempo di menuetto in F♯ minor; * Allegro in E major; * [Moderato] in F minor; * Vivace in E♭ major; * Andantino in C major	1888	HUL 0797	piano	–	(Note: The so-called [Five Short Pieces] for solo piano—each without catalogue designation [HUL 0797]—from 1888 were likely composition exercises that Sibelius wrote for Martin Wegelius.)
Piano (orig.)	Più lento – Tempo di valse in E♭ major	1888	JS 150	piano	–	
Piano (orig.)	Allegretto in G minor	1888	JS 24	piano	–	
Piano (orig.)	Moderato – Presto in D minor	1888	JS 133	piano	–	
Piano (orig.)	Largo in A major	1888	JS 117	piano	–	
Piano (orig.)	Adagio in D major	1888	JS 11	piano	–	
Piano (orig.)	Vivace in D minor	1888	JS 221	piano	–	
Piano (orig.)	Andantino in E major	1888	JS 41	piano	–	
Piano (orig.)	[Presto] in A minor	1888	JS 6	piano	–	
Piano (orig.)	[Polka] in E♭ major	1888–1889	JS 75	piano	–	
Piano (orig.)	Florestan: 1. Moderato; 2. Molto moderato; 3. Andante; 4. Tempo I	1889	JS 82	piano	–	
Piano (orig.)	Allegretto in E major	1889	JS 21	piano	–	
Piano (orig.)	Valse in A♭ major, À Betzy Lerche	1889	JS 1	piano	–	
Piano (orig.)	[Sonata Allegro Exposition] in D minor	1889	JS 179a	piano	–	(Note: Completed by the Finnish composer Kalevi Aho.)
Piano (orig.)	[Sonata Allegro Exposition] in F minor	1889	JS 179b	piano	–	
Piano (orig.)	[Sonata Allegro Exposition] in C major	1889	JS 179c	piano	–	
Piano (orig.)	[Sonata Allegro] in E major	1889	JS 179d	piano	–	
Piano (orig.)	[Sonata Allegro Exposition] in C minor	1889	JS 179e	piano	–	
Piano (orig.)	Scherzo in F♯ minor	1891	JS 164	piano	–	
Piano (orig.)	Theme and Variations in C minor	1891 (lost)	JS 198	piano	–	
Piano (orig.)	Impromptu No. 1 in G minor	1893	Op. 5/1	piano	–	(Note: These works comprise the Op. 5 Six Impromptus (original German title: Sechs Impromptus). For Nos. 5–6, Sibelius reused themes from Nights of Jealousy—a melodrama for narrator, vocalise soprano, and piano trio. In 1894, he combined Nos. 5–6 in an arrangement for strings and titled the new piece Impromptu.)
Piano (orig.)	Impromptu No. 2 in G minor	1893	Op. 5/2	piano	–	
Piano (orig.)	Impromptu No. 3 in A minor	1893	Op. 5/3	piano	–	
Piano (orig.)	Impromptu No. 4 in E minor	1893	Op. 5/4	piano	–	
Piano (orig.)	Impromptu No. 5 in B minor	1893	Op. 5/5	piano	–	
Piano (orig.)	Impromptu No. 6 in E major	1893	Op. 5/6	piano	–	
Piano (orig.)	Piano Sonata in F major: 1. Allegro molto; 2. Andantino; 3. Vivacissimo	1893	Op. 12	piano	–	(Note: Although Breitkopf &Härtel were the first to publish the Op. 12 Piano Sonata in its entirety, Fazer & Westerlund earlier had published Movement III in 1898.)
Piano (orig.)	Impromptu in G minor	1895	Op. 24/1	piano	–	(Note: These works for solo piano comprise the Op. 24 Ten Pieces (original German title: Zehn Stücke). Preliminary/original versions of No. 3 (Caprice in B minor, 1898), No. 6 (Andantino in F major, 1897; Idyll in F major 1897–1898), and No. 7 (Andantino in F major, 1899) are extant.)
Piano (orig.)	Romance in A major	1895	Op. 24/2	piano	–	
Piano (orig.)	Allegretto in F major	1895–1896	JS 23	piano	–	
Piano (orig.)	Lento in E major	1896–1897	JS 119	piano	–	
Piano (orig.)	Allegretto in G minor	1897	JS 225	piano	–	
Piano (orig.)	Romance in D minor	1896–1898	Op. 24/4	piano	–	
Piano (orig.)	Idyll in F major	1897–1898, rev. 1904	Op. 24/6	piano	–	
Piano (orig.)	Caprice in E minor	1898	Op. 24/3	piano	–	
Piano (orig.)	Waltz in E major	1898	Op. 24/5	piano	–	
Piano (orig.)	Andantino in F major	1899, rev. 1899	Op. 24/7	piano	–	
Piano (orig.)	Marche triste	1899	JS 124	piano	–	
Piano (orig.)	Pianokompositioner för barn (Piano Works for Children), 21 sketches	1899	JS 148	piano	–	
Piano (orig.)	Kavaljeren (The Cavalier)	1900	JS 109	piano	–	
Piano (orig.)	Nocturno	1900	Op. 24/8	piano	–	
Piano (orig.)	Romance in D♭ major	1901	Op. 24/9	piano	–	
Piano (orig.)	My Beloved Is Beautiful, Her Mouth Like a Corn-cockle (Minun kultani kaunis on, sen suu kuin auran kukka)	1902–1903	JS 81/1	piano	–	(Note: These pieces for solo piano comprise the JS 81 Six Finnish Folk-Songs.)
Piano (orig.)	I Love You with All My Heart (Sydämestäni rakastan)	1902–1903	JS 81/2	piano	–	
Piano (orig.)	Evening Is Coming (Ilta tulee, ehtoo joutuu)	1902–1903	JS 81/3	piano	–	
Piano (orig.)	That Beautiful Girl (Tuopa tyttö, kaunis tyttö)	1902–1903	JS 81/4	piano	–	
Piano (orig.)	The Fratricide (Velisuurmaaja)	1902–1903	JS 81/5	piano	–	
Piano (orig.)	Wedding Memory (Häämuistelma)	1902–1903	JS 81/6	piano	–	
Piano (orig.)	Barcarole in G minor	1903	Op. 24/10	piano	–	
Piano (orig.)	Kyllikki: 1. Largamente – Allegro; 2. Andantino; 3. Comodo	1904	Op. 41	piano	– (Kalevala)	(Note: Kyllikki, a suite for piano, is subtitled "Three Lyrical Pieces" (original German subtitle: Drei lyrische Stücke).)
Piano (orig.)	Adagio in E major	1907	JS 13	piano	–	
Piano (orig.)	Rêverie	1909	Op. 58/1	piano	–	(Note: These works for solo piano comprise the Op. 58 Ten Pieces (original German title: Zehn Stücke).)
Piano (orig.)	Scherzino	1909	Op. 58/2	piano	–	
Piano (orig.)	Air varié	1909	Op. 58/3	piano	–	
Piano (orig.)	The Shepherd (Der Hirt)	1909	Op. 58/4	piano	–	
Piano (orig.)	The Evening (Des Abends)	1909	Op. 58/5	piano	–	
Piano (orig.)	Dialogue	1909	Op. 58/6	piano	–	
Piano (orig.)	Tempo di minuetto	1909	Op. 58/7	piano	–	
Piano (orig.)	Fisher Songs (Fischerlied)	1909	Op. 58/8	piano	–	
Piano (orig.)	Serenade (Ständchen)	1909	Op. 58/9	piano	–	
Piano (orig.)	Summer Song (Sommerlied)	1909	Op. 58/10	piano	–	
Piano (orig.)	Étude in A minor	1911	Op. 76/2	piano	–	(Note: These works for solo piano comprise the Op. 76 Thirteen Pieces (original French title: Treize Morceaux).)
Piano (orig.)	Piano Sonatina No. 1 in F♯ minor: 1. Allegro; 2. Largo; 3. Allegro moderato	1912	Op. 67/1	piano	–	(Note: These works for solo piano comprise the Op. 67 Three Sonatinas (original German title: Drei Sonatinen).)
Piano (orig.)	Piano Sonatina No. 2 in E major: 1. Allegro; 2. Andantino; 3. Allegro	1912	Op. 67/2	piano	–	
Piano (orig.)	Piano Sonatina No. 3 in B♭ major: 1. Andante – Allegro moderato; 2. Andante – Allegretto	1912	Op. 67/3	piano	–	
Piano (orig.)	Rondino No. 1 in G♯ minor	1912	Op. 68/1	piano	–	(Note: These works for solo piano comprise the Op. 68 Two Rondinos (original German title: Zwei Rondinos).)
Piano (orig.)	Rondino No. 2 in C♯ minor	1912	Op. 68/2	piano	–	
Piano (orig.)	Valsette in E minor	1912	Op. 40/1	piano	–	(Note: These works for solo piano comprise the Op. 40 Lyrical Pieces (original French title: Pensées lyriques).)
Piano (orig.)	Chant sans paroles in E minor	1913	Op. 40/2	piano	–	
Piano (orig.)	Humoresque in C major	1913	Op. 40/3	piano	–	
Piano (orig.)	Berceuse in D major	1913	Op. 40/5	piano	–	
Piano (orig.)	Rêverie in E minor	1913	Op. 34/6	piano	–	(Note: These works for solo piano comprise the Op. 34 Little Pieces (original French title: Bagatelles). The original version of No. 4 (Couplet in D major, 1914) is extant.)
Piano (orig.)	Menuetto in C major	1913	Op. 40/4	piano	–	
Piano (orig.)	Spagnuolo	1913	JS 181	piano	–	
Piano (orig.)	To Longing (Till trånaden)	1913	JS 202	piano	–	
Piano (orig.)	Pensée mélodique in C major	1914	Op. 40/6	piano	–	
Piano (orig.)	Rondoletto in A♭ major	1914	Op. 40/7	piano	–	
Piano (orig.)	Valse in D♭ major	1914	Op. 34/1	piano	–	
Piano (orig.)	Air de danse in E major	1914	Op. 34/2	piano	–	
Piano (orig.)	Mazurka in A major	1914	Op. 34/3	piano	–	
Piano (orig.)	Boutade in A♭ major	1914	Op. 34/5	piano	–	
Piano (orig.)	Eclogue (Ekloge)	1914	Op. 74/1	piano	–	(Note: These works for solo piano comprise the Op. 74 Lyric Pieces (original German title: Lyrische Stücke).)
Piano (orig.)	Soft West Wind (Sanfter Westwind)	1914	Op. 74/2	piano	–	
Piano (orig.)	At the Dance (Auf dem Tanzvergnügen)	1914	Op. 74/3	piano	–	
Piano (orig.)	In the Old House (Im alten Heim)	1914	Op. 74/4	piano	–	
Piano (orig.)	When the Rowan Blossoms (När rönnan blommar)	1914	Op. 75/1	piano	–	
Piano (orig.)	The Solitary Fir Tree (Den ensamma furan)	1914	Op. 75/2	piano	–	
Piano (orig.)	The Aspen (Aspen)	1914	Op. 75/3	piano	–	
Piano (orig.)	The Birch (Björken)	1914	Op. 75/4	piano	–	
Piano (orig.)	Carillon	1914	Op. 76/3	piano	–	
Piano (orig.)	Romanzetta	1914	Op. 76/6	piano	–	
Piano (orig.)	Arabesque in D♭ major	1914	Op. 76/9	piano	–	
Piano (orig.)	Capriccietto	1914	Op. 76/12	piano	–	
Piano (orig.)	Nouvellette in F major	1914	Op. 94/2	piano	–	(Note: These works for solo piano comprise the Op. 94 Six Pieces (original German title: Sechs Stücke).)
Piano (orig.)	Couplet in D major	1914, rev. 1914	Op. 34/4	piano	–	
Piano (orig.)	The Spruce (Granen)	1914, rev. 1919	Op. 75/5	piano	–	
Piano (orig.)	The Lilac (Syringa)	1914 (withdrawn 1919, rev. as Op. 96/1)	~~Op. 75/6~~	piano	–	
Piano (orig.)	Scherzando in A♭ major	1915	Op. 40/8	piano	–	
Piano (orig.)	Petite sérénade in B♭ major	1915	Op. 40/9	piano	–	
Piano (orig.)	Polonaise in C major	1916	Op. 40/10	piano	–	
Piano (orig.)	Danse pastorale in A major	1916	Op. 34/7	piano	–	
Piano (orig.)	Joueur de harpe in B♭ minor	1916	Op. 34/8	piano	–	
Piano (orig.)	Reconnaissance in D major	1916	Op. 34/9	piano	–	
Piano (orig.)	Souvenir in A minor	1916	Op. 34/10	piano	–	
Piano (orig.)	Humoresque in C♯ minor	1916	Op. 76/4	piano	–	
Piano (orig.)	Pièce enfantine	1916	Op. 76/8	piano	–	
Piano (orig.)	Elegiaco in C♯ minor	1916	Op. 76/10	piano	–	
Piano (orig.)	Harlequinade	1916	Op. 76/13	piano	–	
Piano (orig.)	The Carnation (Oeillet)	1916	Op. 85/2	piano	–	(Note: These works for solo piano comprise the Op. 85 Five Pieces (original French title: Cinq Morceaux), although the collection is more commonly referred to as The Flowers due to the thematic link between the descriptive titles of the pieces.)
Piano (orig.)	The Iris (Iris)	1916	Op. 85/3	piano	–	
Piano (orig.)	Esquisse	1917	Op. 76/1	piano	–	
Piano (orig.)	Affettuoso	1917	Op. 76/7	piano	–	
Piano (orig.)	Bluebells (Bellis)	1917	Op. 85/1	piano	–	
Piano (orig.)	The Columbine (Aquileja)	1917	Op. 85/4	piano	–	
Piano (orig.)	The Campanula (Campanula)	1917	Op. 85/5	piano	–	
Piano (orig.)	Mandolinato	1917	JS 123	piano	–	
Piano (orig.)	Scout March (Partiolaisten marssi)	1918	Op. 91b	piano	J. Finne	
Piano (orig.)	Linnæa (The Twinflower of the North)	1918	Op. 76/11	piano	–	
Piano (orig.)	Consolation in C♯ minor	1919	Op. 76/5	piano	–	
Piano (orig.)	Danse in C major	1919	Op. 94/1	piano	–	
Piano (orig.)	Sonnet in B♭ major	1919	Op. 94/3	piano	–	
Piano (orig.)	Shepherd and Shepherdess (Berger et bergerette)	1919	Op. 94/4	piano	–	
Piano (orig.)	Mélodie in B major	1919	Op. 94/5	piano	–	
Piano (orig.)	Gavotte in C major	1919	Op. 94/6	piano	–	
Piano (orig.)	Con passione	1919	JS 53	piano	–	
Piano (orig.)	Andantino 'To O. Parvianen' ('Till O. Parvianen')	1919	JS 201	piano	–	
Piano (orig.)	Humoresque I (Humoreske I)	1920	Op. 97/1	piano	–	(Note: These works for solo piano comprise the Op. 97 Six Bagatelles (original German title: Sechs Bagatellen). Preliminary versions of Nos. 2 and 5, each also from 1920, are extant.)
Piano (orig.)	Song (Lied)	1920	Op. 97/2	piano	–	
Piano (orig.)	Little Waltz (Kleiner Waltzer)	1920	Op. 97/3	piano	–	
Piano (orig.)	Humorous March (Humoristischer Marsch)	1920	Op. 97/4	piano	–	
Piano (orig.)	Impromptu	1920	Op. 97/5	piano	–	
Piano (orig.)	Humoresque II (Humoreske II)	1920	Op. 97/6	piano	–	
Piano (orig.)	Pièce humoristique	1922	Op. 99/1	piano	–	(Note: These works for solo piano comprise the Op. 99 Eight Short Pieces (original French title: Huit petits Morceaux).)
Piano (orig.)	Esquisse	1922	Op. 99/2	piano	–	
Piano (orig.)	Souvenir	1922	Op. 99/3	piano	–	
Piano (orig.)	Impromptu	1922	Op. 99/4	piano	–	
Piano (orig.)	Couplet	1922	Op. 99/5	piano	–	
Piano (orig.)	Animoso	1922	Op. 99/6	piano	–	
Piano (orig.)	Moment de valse	1922	Op. 99/7	piano	–	
Piano (orig.)	Petite Marche	1922	Op. 99/8	piano	–	
Piano (orig.)	Romance	1924	Op. 101/1	piano	–	(Note: These works for solo piano comprise the Op. 101 Five Romantic Compositions (also known by its alternative, Finnish title: Viisi romanttista kappaletta).)
Piano (orig.)	Chant du soir	1924	Op. 101/2	piano	–	
Piano (orig.)	Scène lyrique	1924	Op. 101/3	piano	–	
Piano (orig.)	Humoresque	1924	Op. 101/4	piano	–	
Piano (orig.)	Scène romantique	1924	Op. 101/5	piano	–	
Piano (orig.)	The Village Church	1924	Op. 103/1	piano	–	(Note: These works for solo piano comprise the Op. 103 Five Characteristic Impressions (also known by its alternative, Finnish title: Viisi karakteristista impressiota).)
Piano (orig.)	The Fiddler	1924	Op. 103/2	piano	–	
Piano (orig.)	The Oarsman	1924	Op. 103/3	piano	–	
Piano (orig.)	The Storm	1924	Op. 103/4	piano	–	
Piano (orig.)	In Mournful Mood	1924	Op. 103/5	piano	–	
Piano (orig.)	Landscape (Maisema)	1929	Op. 114/1	piano	–	(Note: These works for solo piano comprise the Op. 114 Five Esquisses (original German title: Fünf Skizzen; also known by its alternative, Finnish title: Viisi luonnosta).)
Piano (orig.)	Winter Scene (Talvikuva)	1929	Op. 114/2	piano	–	
Piano (orig.)	Forest Lake (Metsälampi)	1929	Op. 114/3	piano	–	
Piano (orig.)	Song in the Forest (Metsälaulu)	1929	Op. 114/4	piano	–	
Piano (orig.)	Spring Vision (Kevätnäky)	1929	Op. 114/5	piano	–	
Piano (trans.)	Karelia Suite, select numbers: 1. Intermezzo; 2. Ballade	[1893, arr. 1893], trans. c. 1893–1897	→ Op. 11	piano	–	
Piano (trans.)	The Wood Nymph (Skogsrået), final section only	[1894–1895], trans. 1895	→ Op. 15	piano	– (V. Rydberg)	
Piano (trans.)	King Christian II (Kuningas Kristian II), select numbers: 1. Elegie; 2. Menuetto; 3. Musette; 4. Fool's Song of the Spider	[1898], trans. 1898	→ Op. 27	piano	– (A. Paul)	
Piano (trans.)	Song of the Athenians (Athenarnes sång)	[1899], trans. 1899	→ Op. 31/3	piano	– (V. Rydberg)	
Piano (trans.)	Finlandia, from the Press Celebrations Music	[1899, arr. 1900], trans. 1900	→ Op. 26	piano	–	
Piano (trans.)	Have You Courage? (Har du mod?)	1904, rev. 1911, 1912, trans. 1913	→ Op. 31/2	piano	J.J. Wecksell	
Piano (trans.)	Valse triste, from Death (Kuolema)	[1903, arr. 1904], trans. 1904	→ Op. 44/1	piano	– (A. Järnefelt)	
Piano (trans.)	Pelléas et Mélisande Suite (Pelléas och Mélisande): 1. At the Castle Gate (Vid slottsporten); 2. Mélisande; 3. A Spring in the Park (En källa i parken); 4. The Three Blind Sisters (De trenne blinda systrar); 5. Pastorale; 6. Mélisande at the Spinning Wheel (Mélisande vid sländan); 7. Entr'acte (Mellanaktsmusik); 8. The Death of Mélisande (Mélisandes död)	[1905, arr. 1905], trans. 1905	→ Op. 46	piano	– (M. Maeterlinck)	
Piano (trans.)	Dance Intermezzo (Tanssi-Intermezzo)	[1904], rev./trans. 1904	→ Op. 45/2	piano	–	
Piano (trans.)	Pan and Echo (Pan och Echo)	[1906], trans. 1907	→ Op. 53	piano	–	
Piano (trans.)	Belshazzar's Feast Suite (Belsazars gästabud): 1. Oriental Procession (Orientalisk marsch); 2. Solitude; 3. Nocturne; 4. Khadra's Dance (Khadras dans)	[1906, arr. 1907], trans. 1907	→ Op. 51	piano	– (H. Procopé)	
Piano (trans.)	The Dryad (Dryadi)	[1910], trans. 1910	→ Op. 45/1	piano	–	
Piano (trans.)	The Bells of Kallio Church (Kallion kirkon kellosävel)	[1912], trans. 1912	Op. 65b	piano	–	
Piano (trans.)	Scaramouche, select numbers: 1. Danse élégiaque (Elegiac Dance); 2. Scène d'amour (Love Scene)	[1912–1913], trans. 1914	→ Op. 71	piano	– (P. Knudsen)	
Piano (trans.)	Valse lyrique	1914, rev. 1919 & 1919	Op. 96a	piano	–	
Piano (trans.)	Autrefois	[1919, rev. 1920], trans. 1920	→ Op. 96b	piano	H. Procopé	
Piano (trans.)	Valse chevaleresque	1921–1922, rev. 1922	Op. 96c	piano	–	
Piano (trans.)	Suite mignonne: 1. Petite scène; 2. Polka; 3. Épilogue	[1921], trans. 1921	→ Op. 98a	piano	–	
Piano (trans.)	Suite champêtre: 1. Pièce caractéristique; 2. Mélodie élégiaque; 3. Danse	[1922], trans. 1922	→ Op. 98b	piano	–	
Piano (trans.)	Suite caractéristique: 1. Vivo; 2. Lento; 3. Comodo	[1922], trans. 1922	→ Op. 100	piano	–	
Piano (trans.)	Everyman (Jedermann or Jokamies), select numbers: 1. Episodio; 2. Scena; 3. Canzone	[1916], trans. 1925	→ Op. 83	piano	– (H. von Hofmannsthal)	
Piano (trans.)	Morceau romantique	[1925], trans. 1925	JS 135b	piano	–	
Piano (trans.)	The Tempest Suite Nos. 1 & 2 (Stormen), select numbers: 1. Episode (Miranda); 2. Dance of the Nymphs (Tanz Der Nymphen); 3. Scéne	[1925, arr. 1927], trans. 1927	→ Op. 109	piano	– (W. Shakespeare)	
=== Songs ===					(↑ to top)	
Song	"Serenad" ("Serenade")	1887–1888	JS 167	voice, pf.	J.L. Runeberg	
Song	"En visa" ("A Song")	1888	JS 71	voice, pf.	Baeckman	
Song	"Orgier" ("Orgies")	1888–1889	JS 143	voice, pf.	L. Stenbäck	
Song	"Skogsrået" ("The Wood-Nymph")	1888–1889	JS 171	voice, pf.	V. Rydberg	(Note: Although they share the same poem by Viktor Rydberg, the song "Skogsrået" ("The Wood-Nymph"; JS 171, 1888–1889) is unrelated thematically to the Op. 15 tone poem and melodrama.)
Song	"Likhet" ("Alikeness")	1890	JS 120	voice, pf.	J.L. Runeberg	
Song	"Jag kysser dig ej" ("I Kiss You and Weary Not")	1889–1891	HUL 1183	voice, pf.	J.L. Runeberg	
Song	"Löjet var utan hem" ("Wit Was without a Home")	1890–1891	HUL 1286/2	voice, pf.	J.L. Runeberg	
Song	"Hjärtats morgon" ("The Heart's Morning")	1891	Op. 13/3	voice, pf.	J.L. Runeberg	
Song	"Drömmen" ("The Dream")	1891	Op. 13/5	voice, pf.	J.L. Runeberg	
Song	"Fågellek" ("Play of the Birds")	1891	Op. 17/3	voice, pf.	K.A. Tavaststjerna	
Song	"Våren flyktar hastigt" ("Spring is Flying")	1891	Op. 13/4	voice, pf.	J.L. Runeberg	
Song	"Jägargossen" ("The Young Huntsman")	1891	Op. 13/7	voice, pf.	J.L. Runeberg	
Song	"Sov in!" ("Go to Sleep!")	1891–1892	Op. 17/2	voice, pf.	K.A. Tavaststjerna	
Song	"Se'n har jag ej frågat mera" ("Since Then I Have Questioned No Further")	1891–1892	Op. 17/1	voice, pf.	J.L. Runeberg	
Song	"Tule, tule kultani" ("Come, Come, My Sweetheart")	1892	JS 211	voice, pf.	Traditional	(Note: While in Lieksa during his honeymoon in Finnish Karelia, Sibelius collected folk melodies; one of these was "Tule, tule kultani" ("Come, Come, My Sweetheart"), which he arranged for voice and piano.)
Song	"Under strandens granar" ("Under the Fir-Trees")	1892	Op. 13/1	voice, pf.	J.L. Runeberg	
Song	"Kyssens hopp" ("The Kiss's Hope")	1892	Op. 13/2	voice, pf.	J.L. Runeberg	
Song	"Till Frigga" ("To Frigga")	1892	Op. 13/6	voice, pf.	J.L. Runeberg	
Song	"Det mörknar ute" ("Outside It is Growing Dark")	1897	Op. 1/3	voice, pf.	Z. Topelius	(Note: These songs comprise the Op. 1 Five Christmas Songs, each of which is sung in Swedish. Sibelius subsequently made several arrangements of "Giv mig ej glans, ej guld, ej prakt" ("Give Me No Splendor, Gold or Pomp"): for male choir a cappella in 1935; for voice and female choir a cappella in 1942; for two unaccompanied female voices in 1942; and for children's choir and organ in 1954. He also made several arrangements of "On hanget korkeat, nietokset" ("High are the Snowdrifts"): for two voices and piano in 1903–1905; and for two unaccompanied female voices in 1942.)
Song	"Vilse" ("Astray")	1898, rev. 1902	Op. 17/4	voice, pf.	K.A. Tavaststjerna	
Song	"Illalle" ("To Evening")	1898	Op. 17/6	voice, pf.	A.V. Koskimies	
Song	"Souda, souda, sinisorsa" ("Swim, Duck, Swim")	1899	JS 180	voice, pf.	A.V. Koskimies	
Song	"Segelfahrt" ("Sailing")	1899	JS 166	voice, pf.	J. Öhqvist	
Song	"Svarta rosor" ("Black Roses")	1899	Op. 36/1	voice, pf.	E. Josephson	
Song	"Men min fågel märks dock icke" ("But My Bird Is Long In Homing")	1899	Op. 36/2	voice, pf.	J.L. Runeberg	
Song	"Bollspelet vid Trianon" ("Tennis at Trianon")	1899	Op. 36/3	voice, pf.	G. Fröding	
Song	"Den första kyssen" ("The First Kiss")	1900	Op. 37/1	voice, pf.	J.L. Runeberg	
Song	Säv, säv, susa" ("Sigh, Sigh, Sedges")	1900	Op. 36/4	voice, pf.	G. Fröding	
Song	"Marssnön" ("The March Snow")	1900	Op. 36/5	voice, pf.	J.J. Wecksell	
Song	"Demanten på marssnön" ("The Diamond on the March Snow")	1900	Op. 36/6	voice, pf.	J.J. Wecksell	
Song	"Flickan kom ifrån sun älsklings möte" ("The Girl Returned Home from Meeting Her Lover" or "The Tryst")	1901	Op. 37/5	voice, pf.	J.L. Runeberg	
Song	"On hanget korkeat, nietokset" ("High are the Snowdrifts")	1901	Op. 1/5	voice, pf.	W. Joukahainen	
Song	"Lasse liten" ("Little Lasse")	1902	Op. 37/2	voice, pf.	Z. Topelius	
Song	"Soluppgång" ("Sunrise")	1902	Op. 37/3	voice, pf.	T. Hedberg	
Song	"Var det en dröm?" ("Was It a Dream?")	1902	Op. 37/4	voice, pf.	J.J. Wecksell	
Song	"Lastu lainehilla" ("Driftwood")	1902	Op. 17/7	voice, pf.	I. Calamnius	
Song	"Höstkväll" ("Autumn Evening")	1903	Op. 38/1	voice, pf.	V. Rydberg	
Song	"På verandan vid havet" ("On a Balcony by the Sea")	1903	Op. 38/2	voice, pf.	V. Rydberg	
Song	"I natten" ("In the Night")	1903	Op. 38/3	voice, pf.	V. Rydberg	
Song	"Harpolekaren och Hans son" ("The Harper and His Son")	1904	Op. 38/4	voice, pf.	V. Rydberg	
Song	"Jag ville, jag vore i Indialand" ("I Wish I Were in India")	1904	Op. 38/5	voice, pf.	G. Fröding	
Song	"En slända" ("A Dragonfly")	1904	Op. 17/5	voice, pf.	O. Levertin	
Song	"Lenzgesang" ("Spring Song")	1906	Op. 50/1	voice, pf.	A. Fitger	(Note: These songs comprise the Op. 50 Six Songs, each of which is sung in German.)
Song	"Sehnsucht" ("Longing")	1906	Op. 50/2	voice, pf.	E.R. Weiss	
Song	"Im Feld ein Mädchen singt" ("In the Field a Maid Sings")	1906	Op. 50/3	voice, pf.	M. Susman	
Song	"Aus banger Brust" ("From Anxious Heart")	1906	Op. 50/4	voice, pf.	R. Dehmel	
Song	"Die stille Stadt" ("The Silent City")	1906	Op. 50/5	voice, pf.	R. Dehmel	
Song	"Rosenlied" ("Song of the Roses")	1906	Op. 50/6	voice, pf.	A. Ritter	
Song	"Erloschen" ("Extinguished")	1906	JS 73	voice, pf.	G. Busse-Palma	
Song	"Hundra vägar" ("A Hundred Ways")	1907	Op. 72/6	voice, pf.	J.L. Runeberg	(Note: These songs comprise the Op. 72 Six Songs, of which "Vi ses igen" ("Farewell") and "Orions bälte" ("Orion's Girdle") were lost during the First World War. Of the remaining four songs, two are sung in Swedish, one in German, and one in Finnish.)
Song	"Jubal"	1908	Op. 35/1	voice, pf.	E. Josephson	(Note: These songs comprise the Op. 35 Two Songs, each of which is sung in Swedish.)
Song	"Teodora"	1908	Op. 35/2	voice, pf.	B. Gripenberg	
Song	"Älven och snigeln" ("The River and the Snail")	1909	Op. 57/1	voice, pf.	E. Josephson	
Song	"En blomma stod vid vägen" ("A Flower Stood by the Wayside")	1909	Op. 57/2	voice, pf.	E. Josephson	
Song	"Kvarnhjulet" ("The Mill-wheel")	1909	Op. 57/3	voice, pf.	E. Josephson	
Song	"Maj" ("May")	1909	Op. 57/4	voice, pf.	E. Josephson	
Song	"Jag är ett träd" ("I Am a Tree")	1909	Op. 57/5	voice, pf.	E. Josephson	
Song	"Hertig Magnus" ("Duke Magnus")	1909	Op. 57/6	voice, pf.	E. Josephson	
Song	Vänskapens blomma" ("The Flower of Friendship")	1909	Op. 57/7	voice, pf.	E. Josephson	
Song	"Näcken" ("The Watersprite")	1909	Op. 57/8	voice, pf.	E. Josephson	
Song	"Giv mig ej glans, ej guld, ej prakt" ("Give Me No Splendor, Gold or Pomp")	1909	Op. 1/4	voice, pf.	Z. Topelius	
Song	"Kom nu hit, död" ("Come Away, Death")	1909 (arr. 1909)	Op. 60/1	voice, guitar (or pf.)	W. Shakespeare – C.A. Hagberg, trans. (sv)	
Song	"Hållilå, uti storm och i regn" ("Hey, Ho, the Wind and the Rain")	1909 (arr. 1909)	Op. 60/2	voice, guitar (or pf.)	W. Shakespeare – C.A. Hagberg, trans. (sv)	
Song	"Hymn to Thaïs, the Unforgettable"	1909, rev. 1945–1948	JS 97	voice, pf.	A. Borgström	(Note: "Hymn to Thaïs" is Sibelius's only song sung in English. He revised the piece three times between 1945–1948. The original 1909 version is extant.)
Song	"Vattenplask" ("Lapping Waters")	1910	Op. 61/2	voice, pf.	V. Rydberg	(Note: These songs comprise the Op. 61 Eight Songs, each of which is sung in Swedish.)
Song	"Långsamt som kvällskyn" ("Slowly as the Evening Sky")	1910	Op. 61/1	voice, pf.	K.A. Tavaststjerna	
Song	"När jag drömmer" ("When I Dream")	1910	Op. 61/3	voice, pf.	K.A. Tavaststjerna	
Song	"Romeo"	1910	Op. 61/4	voice, pf.	K.A. Tavaststjerna	
Song	"Romans" ("Romance")	1910	Op. 61/5	voice, pf.	K.A. Tavaststjerna	
Song	"Dolce far niente"	1910	Op. 61/6	voice, pf.	K.A. Tavaststjerna	
Song	"Vårtagen" ("The Spell of Springtide")	1910	Op. 61/8	voice, pf.	B. Gripenberg	
Song	"Fåfäng önskan" ("Idle Wishes")	1910	Op. 61/7	voice, pf.	J.L. Runeberg	
Song	"Arioso"	1911	Op. 3	S, pf.	J.L. Runeberg	
Song	"Nu står jul vid snöig port" ("Now Christmas Stands at the Snowy Gate")	1913	Op. 1/1	voice, pf.	Z. Topelius	
Song	"Nu så kommer julen" ("Now Is Christmas Coming")	1913	Op. 1/2	voice, pf.	Z. Topelius	
Song	"Autumn Song"	1913	JS 199/1	S, A, pf.	R.W. Dixon	(Note: In 1913, at the request of Horatio Parker, Sibelius wrote three short pieces—"Autumn Song", "The Sun upon the Lake is Low", and "A Cavalry Catch"—for The Progressive Music Series of songbooks. Collectively, these three pieces are called the Three Songs for American Schools (JS 199).)
Song	"Vi ses igen" ("Farewell")	1914 (lost)	Op. 72/1	voice, pf.	V. Rydberg	
Song	"Orions bälte" ("Orion's Girdle")	1914 (lost)	Op. 72/2	voice, pf.	Z. Topelius	
Song	"Kyssen" ("The Kiss")	1915	Op. 72/3	voice, pf.	V. Rydberg	
Song	"Der Wanderer und der Bach" ("The Wanderer and the Brook")	1915	Op. 72/5	voice, pf.	M. Greif	
Song	"Kaiutar" ("The Echo Nymph")	1915	Op. 72/4	voice, pf.	Larin-Kyösti	
Song	"Tanken" ("The Thought")	1915	JS 192	2 voices, pf.	J.L. Runeberg	
Song	"Tre trallande jäntor" ("Three Warbling Maidens")	1915 (lost)	JS 204	voice, pf.	G. Fröding	(Note: Sibelius composed, but then doubted, the Swedish-language song "Tre trallande jäntor" ("Three Warbling Maidens", JS 204) in 1915. Likely, he destroyed the piece.)
Song	"Vårförnimmelser" ("The Coming of Spring")	1916	Op. 86/1	voice, pf.	K.A. Tavaststjerna	(Note: These songs comprise the Op. 86 Six Songs, each of which is sung in Swedish.)
Song	"Och finns det en tanke?" ("And Is There a Thought?")	1916	Op. 86/4	voice, pf.	K.A. Tavaststjerna	
Song	"Längtan heter min arvedel" ("Longing Is My Heritage")	1916	Op. 86/2	voice, pf.	E.A. Karlfeldt	
Song	"Dold förening" ("Hidden Union")	1916	Op. 86/3	voice, pf.	C. Snoilsky	
Song	"Sångarlön" ("The Singer's Reward")	1916	Op. 86/5	voice, pf.	C. Snoilsky	
Song	"I systrar, I bröder, I älskande par" ("Ye Sisters, Ye Brothers, Ye Loving Couples")	1917	Op. 86/6	voice, pf.	M. Lybeck	
Song	"Blåsippan" ("The Blue Anemone")	1917	Op. 88/1	voice, pf.	F.M. Franzén	(Note: These songs comprise the Op. 88 Six Songs, each of which is sung in Swedish. Because a thematic link runs through the set, Sibelius considered it a song cycle.)
Song	"De bägge rosorna" ("The Two Roses")	1917	Op. 88/2	voice, pf.	F.M. Franzén	
Song	"Vitsippan" ("The Wood Anemone")	1917	Op. 88/3	voice, pf.	F.M. Franzén	
Song	"Sippan" ("The Anemone")	1917	Op. 88/4	voice, pf.	J.L. Runeberg	
Song	"Törnet" ("The Thorn")	1917	Op. 88/5	voice, pf.	J.L. Runeberg	
Song	"Blommans öde" ("The Flower's Destiny")	1917	Op. 88/6	voice, pf.	J.L. Runeberg	
Song	"Norden" ("The North")	1917	Op. 90/1	voice, pf.	J.L. Runeberg	(Note: These songs comprise the Op. 90 Six Runeberg Songs, each of which is sung in Swedish.)
Song	"Hennes budskap" ("Her Message")	1917	Op. 90/2	voice, pf.	J.L. Runeberg	
Song	"Morgonen" ("The Morning")	1917	Op. 90/3	voice, pf.	J.L. Runeberg	
Song	"Fågelfängaren" ("The Bird Catcher")	1917	Op. 90/4	voice, pf.	J.L. Runeberg	
Song	"Sommarnatten" ("Summer Night")	1917	Op. 90/5	voice, pf.	J.L. Runeberg	
Song	"Vem styrde hit din väg?" ("Who Brought You Hither?")	1917	Op. 90/6	voice, pf.	J.L. Runeberg	
Song	"Mummon syntymäpäivänä" ("Birthday Song to Grandmother")	1919	JS 136	voice, pf.	Anonymous	(Note: Sibelius composed "Mummon syntymäpäivänä" ("Birthday Song to Grandmother"; JS 136, 1919) for his mother-in-law Elisabeth Järnefelt's eightieth birthday. The author of the text is unknown (most likely, it was penned by a member of the Sibelius family) and the song was not intended for public consumption.)
Song	"Små flickorna" ("Young Girls")	1920	JS 174	voice, pf.	H. Procopé	(Note: Sibelius composed the song "Små flickorna" ("Young Girls"; JS 174, 1920) for the Christmas magazine Lucifer.)
Song	"Narciss" ("Narcissus")	1925	JS 140	voice, pf.	B. Gripenberg	(Note: "Narciss" ("Narcissus"; JS 140, 1925) is the final original song that Sibelius composed for voice and piano.)
Song	"Herran siunaus" ("The Lord's Blessing")	1925	JS 95	B, organ	Numbers 6	(Note: In 1925, Sibelius composed four short vocal pieces for the Finnish choral conductor Heikki Klemetti, who commissioned them for a volume of liturgical studies titled Suomen evankelisluterilaisen kirkon Messusävelmät (Mass Songs for the Evangelical Lutheran Church of Finland). The first piece, "Herran siunaus" ("The Lord's Blessing", JS 95), is a song for organ with a liturgist's text written over the music; this is to be sung by a baritone. For the remaining three pieces (JS 110/1–3), the baritone soloist and mixed choir serve, respectively, as the liturgist and the congregation. The JS 110 choral songs are known collectively as the Three Introductory Antiphons (Kolme johdantovuorolaulua).)
Song	"Siltavahti" ("The Guardian of the Bridge")	[1928], arr. 1928	JS 170b	voice, pf.	W. Sola	(Note: Sibelius wrote "Siltavahti" ("The Guardian of the Bridge"; JS 170a) for the male choir New York Laulumiehet in 1928. That same year, he arranged it for voice and piano (JS 170b).)
Song (trans.)	"Kullervon valitus" ("Kullervo's Lament"), from Kullervo	[1892], trans. 1892–1893, rev. 1917–1918	→ Op. 7	voice, pf.	Kalevala, Runo XXXV – F. von Schiefner, trans. (de)	
Song (trans.)	"Koskenlaskijan morsiamet" ("The Rapids-Rider's Brides")	[1897], trans. 1897–1899	→ Op. 33	voice, pf.	A. Oksanen	
Song (trans.)	"Sången om korsspindeln" ("Fool's Song of the Spider"), from King Christian II	[1898], trans. 1898	→ Op. 27/4	voice, pf.	A. Paul	
Song (trans.)	"De trenne blinda systrar" ("The Three Blind Sisters"), from Pelléas et Mélisande	[1905], trans. 1905	→ JS 147/6	voice, pf.	M. Maeterlinck – B. Gripenberg, trans. (sv)	
Song (trans.)	"Den judiska flickans sång" ("The Jewish Girl's Song"), from Belshazzar's Feast	[1906], trans. 1907, rev. 1939	→ JS 48/2b	voice, pf.	H. Procopé	
Song (trans.)	Luonnotar	[1913], trans. 1913	→ Op. 70	S, pf.	Kalevala, Runo I	
Song (trans.)	"Autrefois"	[1919, rev. 1920], arr. 1920	→ Op. 96b	S, S, pf.	H. Procopé	
=== Choral works ===					(↑ to top)	
Choral (a capp.)	[Chorales written for Martin Wegelius] (student exercises) (Note: Note: For display purposes, these student exercises—each of which is without catalogue number—have been combined into an artificial group.): "Credo in unum Deum" [versions 1–2] ("I Believe in One God"); "Allt hvad anda hafver" [versions 1–2] ("Let Every Thing that Hath Breath"); "Gloria Deo in excelsis" [versions 1–2] ("Glory Be to God on High"); "Kyrie eleison" ("Lord, Have Mercy"); "Säll är den som fruktar Herren" ("Blessed is the Man Who Feareth the Lord"); "Morgonens och aftonens portar" ("The Gates of Morning and Evening"); "Svara mig Gud när jag ropar" ("O Lord, Give Ear to My Supplications")	1887–1888	–	chor.	Various	
Choral (a capp.)	"Ensam i dunkla skogarnas famn" ("Alone in the Dark Forest's Clasp")	1888	JS 72	chor.	E. von Qvanten	
Choral (a capp.)	"När sig våren åter föder" ("When Spring is Born Again")	1888	JS 139	chor.	J.L. Runeberg	
Choral (a capp.)	"Tanke, se hur fågeln svingar" ("Imagine, See How the Bird Swoops")	1888	JS 191	chor.	J.L. Runeberg	
Choral (a capp.)	"Hur blekt är allt" ("How Pale is All")	1888	JS 96	chor.	J.L. Runeberg	
Choral (a capp.)	"Ack, hör du fröken Gyllenborg" ("Ah, Do You Hear, Miss Gyllenborg"), folk ballad from Pernå	1888–1889	JS 10	chor.	Anonymous	
Choral (a capp.)	[Chorales written for Albert Becker] (student exercises): "Der König träumte" ("The King Saw a Dream"); "Der Mensch ist in seinem Leben wie Gras" ("As for Man, His Days are as Grass"); "Die Toten werden dich, Herr, nicht loben" ("The Dead Praise Not the Lord"); "Die Wasser sahen dich" ("The Waters Saw Thee"); "Er ist unser Herrscher" [versions 1–3] ("He Is Our Sovereign"); "Gelobet sei dem Herrn" ("May the Lord Be Praised"); "Halleluja Halleluja"; "Halleluja Amen"; "Herr Gott, mein Heiland" [versions 1–4] ("O Lord God of My Salvation"); "Ich gehe hinein zum Altar des Gottes" ("Then Will I Go unto the Alter of God"); "Ich will deines Namens gedenken" ("I Will Make Thy Name Remembered"); "Mein Herr, ich rufe dich an" [versions 1–2] ("My Lord, I Call upon You"); "[Gott] Sei mir gnädig" [versions 1–2] ("Be Merciful unto Me"); "Sende dein Licht und deine Wahrheit" ("O Send Out Thy Light and Thy Truth"); "Dies ist der Tag des Herren" ("This is the Day which the Lord Hath Made"); "Was betrübst du dich meine Seele" ("Why Art Thou Cast Down, O My Soul?")	1888–1889	–	chor.	Various	
Choral (a capp.)	"Työkansan marssi" ("Worker's March")	1893	JS 212	chor.	J.H. Erkko	(Note: Sibelius and J.H. Erkko wrote the "Työkansan marssi" ("Worker's March", JS 212) for the Finnish workers' movement.)
Choral (a capp.)	"Venematka" ("The Boat Journey")	1893 (arr. 1914)	Op. 18/3	mchor. (or chor.)	Kalevala, Runo XL	(Note: These choral pieces comprise the Op. 18 Six Partsongs. Originally composed for male choir, Sibelius subsequently arranged "Sortunut ääni" ("The Broken Voice"), "Venematka" ("The Boat Journey"), "Saarella palaa" ("Fire on the Island"), and "Sydämeni laulu" ("Song of My Heart") for mixed choir. An additional three partsongs—"Isänmaalle" ("To the Fatherland", JS 98), "Veljeni vierailla mailla" ("My Brothers Abroad", JS 217), and "Min rastas raataa" ("Busy as a Thrush", JS 129)—are associated with Op. 18, as each was at one point numbered among Op. 18 before Sibelius demoted them from his opus list. Sibelius wrote "Isänmaalle" (JS 98a) for male choir in 1899, but revised it in 1900 while arranging it for mixed choir (JS 98c). Finally, in 1908 he arranged the revised version for male choir (JS 98b). Note: The fragment "Heitä, koski, kuohuminen" ("Rapids, Cease Your Foaming") (1893, JS 94) for male choir a cappella, which Sibelius may have planned as a continuation of "Venematka", was later completed by Erik Bergman, Jussi Jalas, and Erik Tawaststjerna.)
Choral (a capp.)	"Soitapas sorea neito" ("Play, Pretty Maiden")	1893–1894	JS 176	T, chor.	Kanteletar, Book II:238	
Choral (a capp.)	Rakastava (The Lover): 1. "Rakastava" ("The Lover"); 2. "Rakastetun tie" ("The Path of the Beloved"); 3. "Hyvää iltaa ... Jää hyvästi" ("Good Evening ... Farewell!")	1894 (arr. 1898)	JS 160a(c)	T, mchor. (or S, B, chor.)	Kanteletar, Book I:173–74, 122	
Choral (a capp.)	"Laulun mahti" ("The Power of Song"), arr. of J. Vītols's song	1895	JS 118	T, mchor.	Aukselis – J.J. Mikkola, trans. (fi)	
Choral (a capp.)	"Saarella palaa" ("Fire on the Island")	1895 (arr. 1898)	Op. 18/4	mchor. (or chor.)	Kanteletar, Book I:186	
Choral (a capp.)	"Juhlamarssi" ("Festive March"), from the Promotional Cantata of 1894	[1894], arr. c. 1896	→ JS 105	chor.	K. Leino	
Choral (a capp.)	"Hymne" ("Hymn")	1896, rev. 1898	Op. 21	mchor.	F. Gustafsson	
Choral (a capp.)	Songs for Mixed Chorus from the 1897 Promotional Cantata (Lauluja sekaköörille 1897 vuoden promotiooni kantaatista): 1. "Me nuoriso Suomen" ("We the Youth of Finland"); 2. "Tuuli tuudittele" ("The Wind Rocks"); 3. "Oi toivo, toivo, sä lietomieli" ("Oh Hope, Hope, You Dreamer"); 4. "Montapa elon merellä" ("Many on the Sea of Life"); 5. "Sammuva sainio maan" ("The Fading Thoughts of the Earth"); 6. (a) "Soi kiitokseksi Luojan" ("We Praise Thee, Our Creator") (b) "Tuule, tuuli, leppeämmin" ("Blow, Wind, More Gently"); 7. "Oi Lempi, sun valtas ääretön on" ("O Love, Your Realm is Limitless"); 8. "Kun virta vuolas" ("As the Swift Current"); 9. "Oi kallis Suomi, äiti verraton" ("O Precious Finland, Mother Beyond Compare")	[1897], arr. 1898	Op. 23	S, B, chor.	A.V. Koskimies	
Choral (a capp.)	"Kuutamolla" ("In the Moonlight")	1898	JS 114	mchor.	A. Kallas	
Choral (a capp.)	Carminalia, a setting of three school songs: 1. "Ecce novum gaudium" ("Behold a New Joy"); 2. "Angelus emittitur" ("An Angel is Sent Out"); 3. "In stadio laboris" ("In Athletic Strife")	1898	JS 51a	chor.	Piae Cantiones	(Note: In 1898, Sibelius wrote Carminalia, a choral suite originally for three-part mixed choir (JS 51a). That same year, he made two arrangements: the first, for two-part female choir and organ (or harmonium) (JS 51b); and the second, for two-part female choir and piano (JS 51c).)
Choral (a capp.)	"Min rastas raataa" ("Busy as a Thrush")	1898	JS 129	chor.	Kanteletar, Book I:219	
Choral (a capp.)	"Sortunut ääni" ("The Broken Voice")	1898 (arr. 1898)	Op. 18/1	mchor. (or chor.)	Kanteletar, Book I:57	
Choral (a capp.)	"Sydämeni laulu" ("Song of My Heart")	1898 (arr. 1904)	Op. 18/6	mchor. (or chor.)	A. Kivi	
Choral (a capp.)	"Aamusumussa" ("In the Morning Mist")	1898 (arr. c. 1913)	JS 9a(b)	chor. (or fchor. or cchor.)	J.H. Erkko	(Note: In 1898, Sibelius composed "Aamusumussa" ("In the Morning Mist", JS 9a) for mixed choir. In 1913, he made an arrangement for female (or children's) choir (JS 9b).)
Choral (a capp.)	"Isänmaalle" ("To the Fatherland")	1899 (rev. & arr. 1900), arr. 1908	JS 98a/b(c)	mchor. (or chor.)	P. Cajander	
Choral (a capp.)	"Metsämiehen laulu" ("The Woodsman's Song")	1899	Op. 18/5	mchor.	A. Kivi	
Choral (a capp.)	"Terve, kuu" ("Hail Moon")	1901	Op. 18/2	mchor.	Kalevala, Runo XLIX	
Choral (a capp.)	"Kotikaipaus" ("Homesickness")	1902	JS 111	3 female voices	W. von Konow	
Choral (a capp.)	"Den 25 oktober 1902. Till Thérèse Hahl" ("... To Thérèse Hahl") [Version I]	1902	JS 60	chor.	N. Wasastjerna	(Note: Sibelius composed "Den 25 oktober 1902. Till Thérèse Hahl" (JS 60) for the 60th birthday of the Finnish choral singer Thérèse Hahl. Presumably to modify the disgruntled poet Nils Wasastjerna, who had disliked the setting, Sibelius undertook a second attempt (JS 61). The two versions do not share thematic material and, as such, are treated as separate works.)
Choral (a capp.)	"Den 25 oktober 1902. Till Thérèse Hahl" ("... To Thérèse Hahl") [Version II]	1902	JS 61	chor.	N. Wasastjerna	
Choral (a capp.)	"Har du mod?" ("Have You Courage?")	1903–1904	JS 93	mchor.	J.J. Wecksell	
Choral (a capp.)	"Veljeni vierailla mailla" ("My Brothers Abroad")	1904	JS 217	mchor.	J. Aho	
Choral (a capp.)	"Ej med klagan" ("Not with Lamentation")	1905	JS 69	chor. (or mchor.)	J.L. Runeberg	(Note: Sibelius composed the choral song "Ej med klagan" ("Not with Lamentation", JS 69) for the 24 August 1905 funeral of the Finnish painter Albert Edelfelt. It is possible that he reused themes from the abandoned Marjatta oratorio.)
Choral (a capp.)	"Kansakoululaisten marssi" ("March of the Primary School Children")	1910	JS 103	chor.	O. Pekka	(Note: Sibelius composed the short choral song "Kansakoululaisten marssi" ("March of the Primary School Children", JS 103) to commemorate the centennial of Uno Cygnaeus, father of the Finnish public school system.)
Choral (a capp.)	"Kantat" ("Cantata")	1911	JS 107	fchor.	W. von Konow	(Note: Sibelius composed the choral song "Kantat" ("Cantata") to commemorate the fiftieth anniversary of the girls' school in Turku at which his childhood friend Walter von Konow—the text's author—had taught history c. 1900.)
Choral (a capp.)	"Män från slätten och havet" ("Men from Land and Sea")	1911	Op. 65a	chor.	E. Knape	
Choral (a capp.)	"Kallion kirkon kellosävel" ("The Bells of Kallio Church")	[1912], arr. 1912	Op. 65b	chor.	H. Klemetti	
Choral (a capp.)	"Uusmaalaisten laulu" ("Song of the People of Uusimaa")	1912	JS 214a(b)	chor. (or mchor.)	K. Terhi	
Choral (a capp.)	"Soi kiitokseksi Luojan" ("We Praise Thee, Our Creator"), from the Songs for Mixed Chorus from the 1897 Promotional Cantata	[1897], arr. 1913	→ Op. 23/6a	fchor. (or cchor.)	A.V. Koskimies	
Choral (a capp.)	"Terve ruhtinatar" ("Hail Princess"), from the Cantata for the Coronation of Nicholas II	[1896], arr. c. 1913	→ JS 104	fchor. (or cchor.)	P. Cajander	
Choral (a capp.)	"Nejden andas" ("The Landscape Breathes"), from The Breaking of the Ice on the Oulu River	[1899], arr. c. 1913	→ Op. 30	fchor. (or cchor.)	Z. Topelius	
Choral (a capp.)	"The Sun upon the Lake is Low"	1913	JS 199/2	chor.	W. Scott	
Choral (a capp.)	"Herr Lager och Skön fager" ("Mr. Lager and the Fair One")	1914	Op. 84/1	mchor.	G. Fröding	(Note: From 1914–1917, Sibelius composed the Op. 84 Five Songs for male choir a cappella. Nos. 1–4 were commissioned by the vocal choir Muntra Musikanter. The remaining song, "Till havs" ("To Sea"), was written in 1917 for Akademiska sångföreningen; that same year, he made minor revisions. The first version is extant.)
Choral (a capp.)	"På berget" ("On the Mountain")	1915	Op. 84/2	mchor.	B. Gripenberg	
Choral (a capp.)	"Evige Eros" ("Eternal Eros")	1915	Op. 84/4	B, mchor.	B. Gripenberg	
Choral (a capp.)	"Ett drömackord" ("A Dream Chord")	1915	Op. 84/3	mchor.	G. Fröding	
Choral (a capp.)	"Till havs" ("To Sea")	1917, rev. 1917	Op. 84/5	mchor.	J. Reuter	
Choral (a capp.)	"Drömmarna" ("The Dreams")	1917	JS 64	chor.	J. Reuter	
Choral (a capp.)	"Fridolins dårskap" ("Fridolin's Folly")	1917	JS 84	mchor.	E.A. Karlfeldt	
Choral (a capp.)	"Ute hörs stormen" ("Outside the Storm is Raging")	1918	JS 224/1	mchor.	G. Schybergson	
Choral (a capp.)	"Brusande rusar en våg" ("The Roaring of a Wave")	1918	JS 224/2	mchor.	G. Schybergson	
Choral (a capp.)	"Jone havsfärd" ("Jonah's Voyage")	1918	JS 100	mchor.	E.A. Karlfeldt	
Choral (a capp.)	"Viipurin Laulu-Veikkojen kunniamarssi" ("Honor March of the Singing Brothers of Viipuri") [Version I]	1920	JS 219	mchor.	E. Eerola	
Choral (a capp.)	"Likhet" ("Resemblance")	1922	JS 121	mchor.	J.L. Runeberg	
Choral (a capp.)	"Koulutie" ("The Way to School")	1924	JS 112	chor.	V.A. Koskenniemi	
Choral (a capp.)	"Humoreski" ("Humoresque")	1925	Op. 108/1	mchor.	Larin-Kyösti	
Choral (a capp.)	"Ne pitkän matkan kulkijat" ("Wanderers on the Long Way")	1925	Op. 108/2	mchor.	Larin-Kyösti	
Choral (a capp.)	"Skolsång" ("School Song")	1925	JS 172	chor.	N. Runeberg	
Choral (a capp.)	"Den höga himlen" ("The Lofty Heaven")	1927	JS 58a	chor.	S. Korpela – J. Tegengren, trans. (sv)	(Note: In 1927, Sibelius composed "Den höga himlen" ("The Lofty Heaven"; JS 58a) for the revised edition of the Swedish-language Finnish hymn book. The song can also be sung in Finnish as "Suur' olet Herra" (indeed, Simo Korpela's poem is originally in Finnish). In 1945, Sibelius arranged the Finnish original for male vocal quartet with organ accompaniment (JS 58b).)
Choral (a capp.)	"Siltavahti" ("The Guardian of the Bridge")	1928	JS 170a	mchor.	W. Sola	
Choral (a capp.)	"On lapsonen syntynyt meille" ("A Child is Born to Us")	1929	JS 142	chor.	A.V. Jaakkola	
Choral (a capp.)	"Viipurin Laulu-Veikkojen kunniamarssi" ("Honor March of the Singing Brothers of Viipuri") [Version II]	1929	JS 220	mchor.	E. Eerola	
Choral (a capp.)	"Giv mig ej glans, ej guld, ej prakt" ("Give Me No Splendor, Gold or Pomp")	[1909], arr. 1935 (arr. 1942)	→ Op. 1/4	mchor. (or S, fchor.)	Z. Topelius	
Choral (a capp.)	"Finlandia-hymnin" ("Finlandia Hymn"), from Finlandia	[1899], arr. 1938 & 1940 (arr. 1948)	→ Op. 26	mchor. (or chor.)	W. Sola (1938); V.A. Koskenniemi (1940)	(Note: Sibelius first arranged "Finlandia-hymnin" ("Finlandia Hymn") in 1938 for male choir to words by Sola. In 1940, he substituted Koskenniemi's text for Sola's and made two arrangements for mixed choir: in F major and A♭ major.)
Choral (accmp.)	"Oje Carulì" ("Oh Caroline"), arr. of a song by M.P. Costa	1887–1888 (partially survives)	JS 99/1	B, chor., pf.	S. di Giacomo	(Note: These songs comprise the JS 99 Two Italian Folk Songs, which Sibelius arranged sometime between 1887 and 1888. Only the parts for mixed choir, however, are extant; as such, BIS's world premiere recording made use of existing (that is, non-Sibelius) piano parts, as well as—for No. 1—the solo part for baritone.)
Choral (accmp.)	"Trippole trappole", arr. of a Spanish folk song adapted by G.L. Cottrau	1887–1888 (partially survives)	JS 99/2	chor., pf.	Traditional	(Note: These songs comprise the JS 99 Two Italian Folk Songs, which Sibelius arranged sometime between 1887 and 1888. Only the parts for mixed choir, however, are extant; as such, BIS's world premiere recording made use of existing (that is, non-Sibelius) piano parts, as well as—for No. 1—the solo part for baritone.)
Choral (accmp.)	"Upp genom luften" ("Up through the Air")	1888	JS 213	chor., pf.	Atterbom	
Choral (accmp.)	"Vi kysser du fader min fästmö här?" ("Why, O Father, Do You Kiss My Bride?")	1889–1890	JS 218	chor., pf.	J.L. Runeberg	
Choral (accmp.)	Carminalia, a setting of three school songs: 1. "Ecce novum gaudium" ("Behold a New Joy"); 2. "Angelus emittitur" ("An Angel is Sent Out"); 3. "In stadio laboris" ("In Athletic Strife")	[1898], arr. 1898	JS 51b(c)	fchor., organ or harm. (or piano)	Piae Cantiones	
Choral (accmp.)	The Origin of Fire (Tulen synty)	[1902, rev. 1910], arr. 1910	→ Op. 32	B, mchor., pf.	Kalevala, Runo XLVII	
Choral (accmp.)	Impromptu	[1902, rev. 1910], arr. 1910	Op. 19	fchor., pf.	V. Rydberg	
Choral (accmp.)	"Har du mod?" ("Have You Courage?")	[1904], arr. 1904, rev. & arr. 1911	→ Op. 31/2	mchor., pf.	J.J. Wecksell	
Choral (accmp.)	"A Cavalry Catch"	1913	JS 199/3	mchor., pf.	F. MacLeod	
Choral (accmp.)	"Jääkärien marssi" ("Jäger March")	1917	Op. 91a	mchor., pf.	H. Nurmio	
Choral (accmp.)	"Partiolaisten marssi" ("Scout March")	[1918, arr. 1918], arr. 1921	→ Op. 91b	chor., pf.	J. Finne	
Choral (accmp.)	"Skyddskårsmarsch" ("Skyddskår's March")	1925	JS 173	mchor., pf. (ad lib.)	N. Runeberg	
Choral (accmp.)	"Palmusunnuntaina" ("On Palm Sunday")	1925	JS 110/1	B, chor., organ	Psalms 23, 111, 42	
Choral (accmp.)	"Pyhainpaivana tai hautajaisjumalanpalveluksissa" ("On All Saints' Day")	1925	JS 110/2	B, chor., organ	Revelation 14, Psalm 126	
Choral (accmp.)	"Kristillisissa nuorisojuhlissa" ("For Christian Youth Ceremonies")	1925	JS 110/3	B, chor., organ	Ecclesiastes 12, Gloria Patri	
Choral (accmp.)	"Karjalan osa" ("Karelia's Fate")	1930	JS 108	mchor., pf.	A. Nurminen	(Note: In 1930, Sibelius composed "Karjalan osa" ("Karelia's Fate", JS 108) as an anthem for the newly-founded anti-Communist league, the Lapua Movement.)
Choral (accmp.)	"Partiolaisten marssi" ("Scout March") [a.k.a. "The World Song of the World Association of Girl Scouts and Girl Guides"]	[1918, arr. 1918], arr. 1952	→ Op. 91b	fchor., pf.	G. Ewart	
Choral (accmp.)	"Giv mig ej glans, ej guld, ej prakt" ("Give Me No Splendor, Gold or Pomp")	[1909], arr. 1954	→ Op. 1/4	cchor., organ	Z. Topelius	
Choral (accmp.)	Masonic Ritual Music (Vapaamuurareiden rituaalimusiikkia): 1. Opening Hymn (Avaushymni); 2. Adjusting the altar: (Alttarin valmistus). "Suloinen aate" ("Thoughts Be Our Comfort"); 3. Procession and hymn (Kulkue ja hymni) I. "Näätkö, kuinka hennon yrtin" ("Though Young Leaves Be Green"); 4. Hymn of Praise (Ylistyshymni). "Kaikkialla kaikukoon, kunnias sun kuulukoon" ("Praise Thy Holy Name on High"); 5. Procession and hymn (Kulkue ja hymni) II. "Kellä kaipuu rinnassansa" ("Whosoever Hath a Love"); 6. Ode to Fraternity (Veljesvirsi). "Kaunist' on, kun veljet viihtyy" ("Good and Pleasant, O Ye Brethren"); 7. Procession and hymn (Kulkue ja hymni) III. "Ken kyynelin ei milloinkaan" ("Who Ne'er Hath Blent His Bread with Tears"); 8. Marche funèbre (Surumarssi); 9. Salem. "Kulje, kansa" ("Onward, Ye Brethren"); 10. Ode. "Suur' olet, Herra" ("You are Mighty, O Lord") ["The Lofty Heaven", JS 58a]; 11. "On kaunis maa, elo kaunis on" ("How Fair are Earth and Living"); 12. "Finlandia-hymnin" ("Finlandia Hymn") [from Op. 26]	1927, rev. 1936, 1946, & 1948	Op. 113	T, mchor., organ (or harm.)	Various	
Choral (accmp.)	"Suur' olet Herra" ("The Lofty Heaven")	[1927], arr. 1945	JS 58b	mchor, organ	S. Korpela – J. Tegengren, trans. (sv)	
=== Preliminary versions and fragments ===					(↑ to top)	
Orch. (frag.)	[Luonnotar], predecessor to Pohjola's Daughter	1903–1905	HUL 0163	orch.	–	
Orch. (frag.)	[Suite for Orchestra], predecessor to The Oceanides: 1. Tempo moderato –; 2. Allegro	1913–1914	–	orch.	–	
Chamber (frag.)	Den lilla sjöjungfrun (The Little Mermaid)	1887–1888 (abandoned, partially survives)	JS 59	Nar., 2 vl., va., vc. (probable)	H.C. Andersen – K.J. Backman, trans. (sv)	
Chamber (frag.)	String Trio in G minor: 1. Lento; 2. Allegro; 3. [no tempo marking]	1893–1894	JS 210	vl., va., vc.	–	(Note: The String Trio in G minor (JS 210) is in three movements, of which the second and third are incomplete.)
Chamber (frag.)	[March], preliminary version of Scout March (Partiolaisten marssi)	1897–1899	HUL 0504	torviseitsikko, perc.	–	
Violin (frag.)	[Mazurka] in C major	1883	HUL 0536a/2	violin	–	
Violin (frag.)	Impromptu in G minor	1884	HUL 0525/3	violin	–	
Song (frag.)	"Medan nordanvinden gnyr" ("While the North Wind Roars")	1888	HUL 1283	2 voices, vc.	Anonymous	
Song (frag.)	"Då världar ännu skapade ej voro" ("When Worlds Still Uncreated Were")	1888	JS 56	voice, vc. (?), pf.	Anonymous	(Note: "Då världar ännu skapade ej voro" ("When Worlds Still Uncreated Were", JS 56) is a song fragment that dates to 1888. The author of the text is unknown.)
Song (frag.)	"Solen slog himlen röd" ("The Sun Reddened the Sky")	1888	HUL 1179	voice, pf.	E. Josephson	
Song (frag.)	"Höstkväll" ("Autumn Evening")	1888–1889	HUL 1180	voice, pf.	V. Rydberg	
Song (frag.)	"Flickan gick en vintermorgan" ("The Maiden Went Out One Winter Morning")	1890–1892	HUL 1186	voice, pf.	J.L. Runeberg	
Song (frag.)	"Den första kyssen" ("The First Kiss")	1891–1892	JS 57	voice, pf.	J.L. Runeberg	
Song (frag.)	"Frihet" ("Freedom")	1891–1892	–	voice, pf.	K.A. Tavaststjerna	
Song (frag.)	"Drick, De förflyga de susande pärlorna" ("Drink, the Fizzling Pearls are Flying Away")	1891–1892	–	voice, pf.	F.M. Franzén	
Song (frag.)	"Romans" ("Romance")	1905	–	voice, pf.	K.A. Tavaststjerna	
Song (frag.)	"Och skull ditt hjärta jag fångat" ("And If I had Captured Your Heart")	1908–1910	–	voice, pf.	[Unknown]	
Song (prelim.)	[preliminary version of "Säv, säv, susa"]	1900	JS 42	voice, pf.	G. Fröding	
Song (prelim.)	[preliminary version of "Soluppgång"]	1902	JS 87	voice, pf.	T. Hedberg	
Song (prelim.)	[preliminary version of "Vänskapens blomma"]	1909	JS 215	voice, pf.	E. Josephson	
Choral (frag.)	"Heitä, koski, kuohuminen" ("Rapids, Cease Your Foaming")	1893	JS 94	mchor.	Kalevala, Runo XL	
Choral (frag.)	"Listen to the Water Mill"	1905–1906	JS 122	chor.	S. Doudney	
Unknown	March of the Pori Regiment (Porilaisten marssi), arrangement [I] of the original	arr. 1892 (lost)	JS 151	chamber ensemble	–	
Unknown	"The American Millers' Song"	[Unknown] (lost)	JS 29	voice, pf. (probable)	[Unknown]	(Note: Nothing is known about the lost work "The American Millers' Song" (JS 29) other than the fact that it is mentioned in several of Sibelius's personal catalogues (for example, those from 1909, 1911, and 1915).)
Unknown	Snöfallet (The Snowfall)	1927 (lost)	JS 175	voice, pf. (probable)	[Unknown]	(Note: Nothing is known about the lost work Snöfallet (The Snowfall, JS 175) other than the fact that Sibelius composed it in September 1927 as a gift for the Finnish industrialist Jacob von Julin.)
			~~Op. 107~~			
			~~Op. 117~~			
