= Five Pieces, Op. 75 (Sibelius) =

Piano pieces by Jean Sibelius (1914)

Five Pieces
- The Trees
- Piano solos by Jean Sibelius
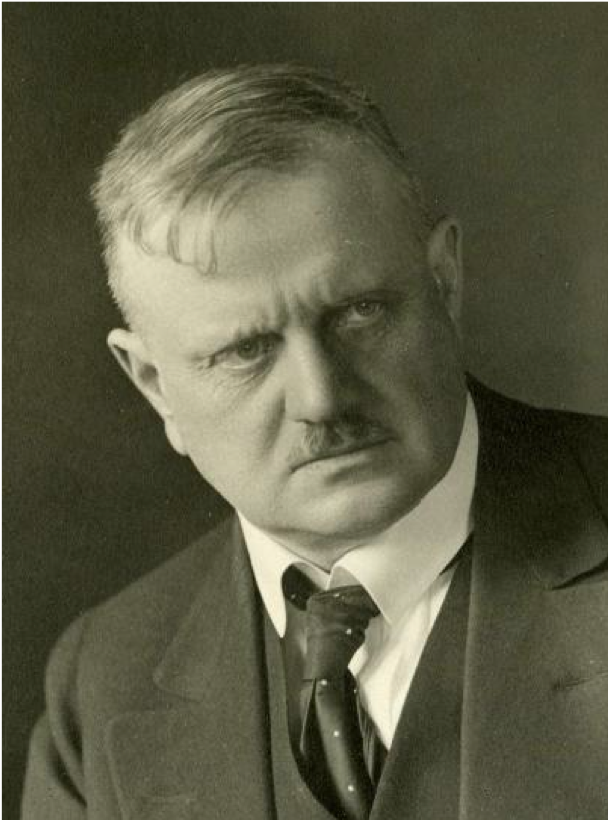
- Sibelius in middle age (c. 1915)
- Opus: 75
- Composed: 1914, rev. 1919
- Publisher: piecemeal by three firms
- Duration: 11 mins

The Five Pieces (in French: Cinq Morceaux), Op. 75, is a collection of compositions for piano written in 1914 by the Finnish composer Jean Sibelius. The Five Pieces, however, is more commonly referred to by its informal nickname The Trees due to the fact that the descriptive titles of the five pieces share a thematic link.

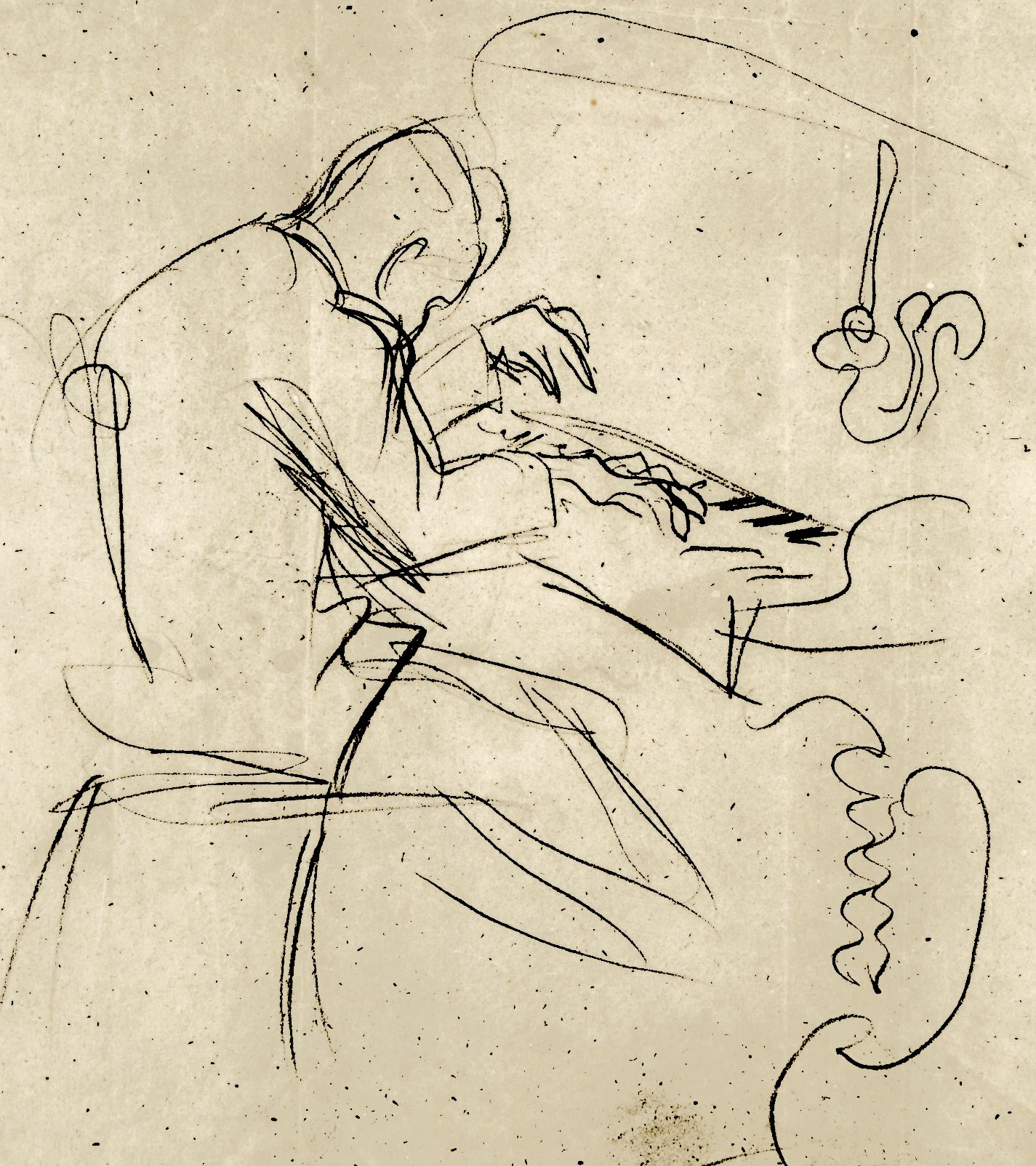
An 1892 sketch of Sibelius at the piano by his future brother-in-law Eero Järnefelt

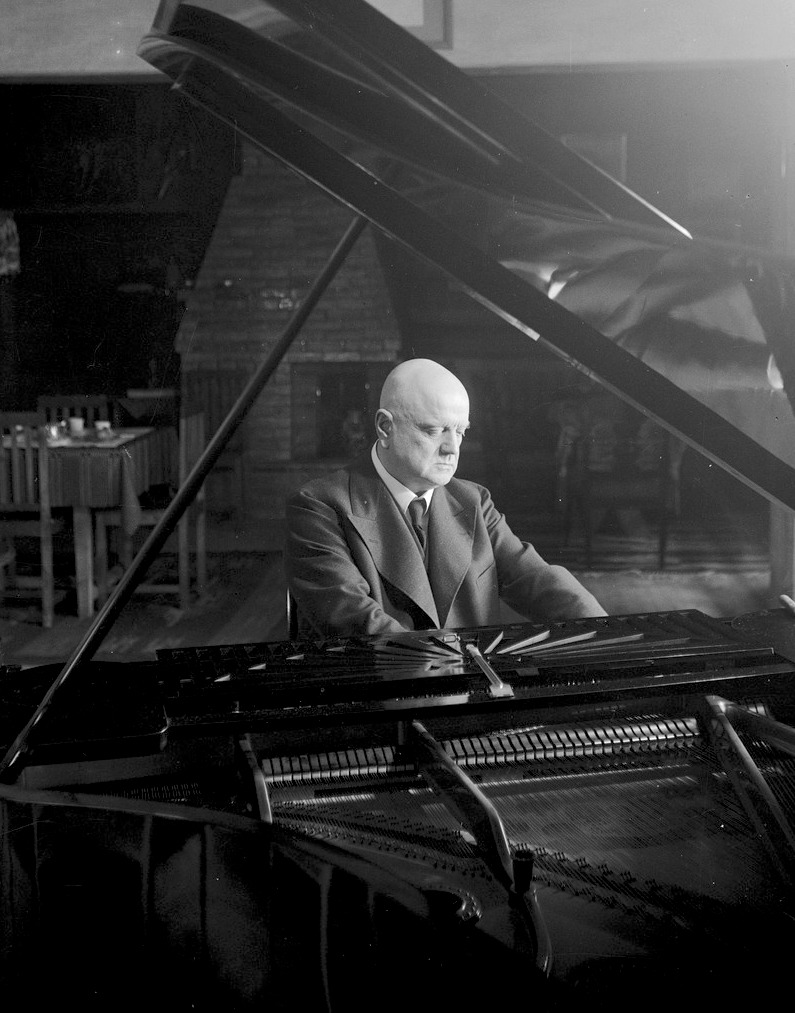
Sibelius (1927) plays the Steinway grand piano at his home, Ainola.

== Structure and music ==
=== No. 1: When the Rowan Blossoms ===
When the Rowan Blossoms (Swedish: När rönnan blommar; in Finnish: Kun pihlaja kukkii) was published in 1921 by the London-based firm of Augener & Co.. Marked Allegretto, it has a duration of about two minutes.

=== No. 2: The Solitary Fir Tree ===
The Solitary Fir Tree (in Swedish: Den ensamma furan; in Finnish: Yksinäinen honka) was published in 1921 by London's J. & W. Chester. Marked Grave, it has a duration of about two minutes.

=== No. 3: The Aspen ===
The Aspen (in Swedish: Aspen; in Finnish: Haapa) was published in 1922 by Edition Wilhelm Hansen in Copenhagen. Marked Andantino, it has a duration of about 2.5 minutes.

=== No. 4: The Birch ===
The Birch (in Swedish: Björken; in Finnish: Koivu) was also published in 1922 by Hansen. Marked Allegro – Misterioso, it has a duration of about 1.5 minutes.

=== No. 5: The Spruce ===
The Spruce (in Swedish: Granen; in Finnish: Kuusi) was also published in 1922 by Hansen, after Sibelius had revised the piece in 1919. Marked Stretto – Lento – Risoluto – Lento, it has a duration of about three minutes.

== Reception ==
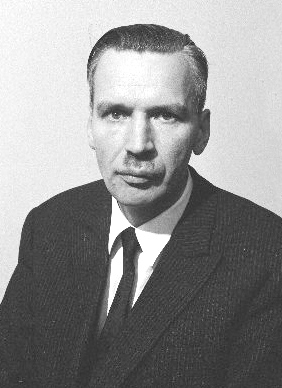
Erik Tawaststjerna, who authored seminal biography on Sibelius, was an early, vocal advocate for many of the composer's piano pieces.

== Discography ==
The Finnish-German pianist Ralf Gothoni made the first studio recording of the complete Op. 75 Five Pieces in 1971 for EMI; of these, When the Rowan Blooms, The Solitary Fir Tree, and The Birch (Nos. 1–2 and 4) were world premieres. The remaining two pieces, The Aspen and The Spruce (Nos. 3 and 5), had been recorded earlier in 1959 by the Hungarian pianist Ervin László for RCA Victor (RCA LM–9828). The sortable table below lists, in addition to the aforementioned Gothoni traversal, other commercially available recordings of The Trees, as a whole:

No.	Pianist	Runtimes (Note: All runtimes are official, as printed on CD or LP liner notes.)						Rec. (Note: Refers to the year in which the performers recorded the work; this may not be the same as the year in which the recording was first released to the general public.)	Recording venue	Label	Ref.
No.	Pianist	Op. 75/1	Op. 75/2	Op. 75/3	Op. 75/4	Op. 75/5	Total	Rec.	Recording venue	Label	Ref.
1	Ralf Gothoni (1)							1971	[unknown], Helsinki	EMI	(Note: R. Gothóni–EMI (E063–34283) 1971)
2	Izumi Tateno (1)	1:45	2:30	2:30	1:25	3:00	11:10	1971		EMI	(Note: I. Tateno–EMI (7491062) 1988)
3	Liisa Karhilo						10:33			Musical Heritage Society	(Note: L. Karhilo–Musical Heritage (MHS 3401) 1977)
4	Erik T. Tawaststjerna	1:52	2:03	2:23	1:25	2:53	11:01	1983	Studio BIS, Djursholm	BIS	(Note: E. Tawaststjerna–BIS (CD–230) 1987)
5	Izumi Tateno (2)							1988	Järvenpää Hall	Canyon Classics	(Note: I. Tateno–Canyon Classics (C28L0001) 1988)
6	Marita Viitasalo	1:55	2:42	2:50	1:35	3:28	12:30	1992	Järvenpää Hall	Finlandia	(Note: M. Viitasalo–Finlandia (4509–95874–2) 1993)
7	Annette Servadei	2:09	2:15	3:39	1:27	2:35	12:05	1994	St George's Church, Brandon Hill	Olympia	(Note: A. Servadei–Olympia (OCD 634) 1997)
8	Izumi Tateno (3)	1:42	2:18	2:36	1:32	3:00	11:08	1994	Ainola	Canyon Classics	(Note: I. Tateno–Canyon Classics (PCCL–00243) 1994)
9	Ralf Gothoni (2)							1995	Järvenpää Hall	Ondine	(Note: R. Gothóni–Ondine (ODE 847–2) 1995)
10	Risto Lauriala	1:45	2:50	2:18	1:44	3:40	12:17	1995	Järvenpää Hall	Naxos	(Note: R. Lauriala–Naxos (8.553661) 1996)
11	Eero Heinonen (1)	1:51	2:43	2:40	1:41	3:32	12:27	1996	YLE M2 Studio, Helsinki	Finlandia	(Note: E. Heinonen–Finlandia (8573–80776–2) 2000)
12	Kyoko Tabe	2:00	2:44	2:21	1:41	3:20	12:13	1999	New Broadcasting House, Manchester	Chandos	(Note: K. Tabe–Chandos (CHAN 9833) 2000)
13	Håvard Gimse	1:51	2:43	2:20	1:41	3:32	12:07	2000	St Martin's Church, East Woodhay	Naxos	(Note: H. Gimse–Naxos (8.555363) 2003)
14	Katriina Korte							2001	Järvenpää Hall	Alba	(Note: K. Korte–Alba (ABCA 159) 2001)
15	Tuija Hakkila							2008	Nya Paviljongen	Alba	(Note: T. Hakkila–Alba (ABCD 297) 2010)
16	Folke Gräsbeck	1:55	3:05	2:43	1:32	3:17	12:49	2009	Kuusankoski Hall	BIS	(Note: F. Gräsbeck–BIS (CD–1927/29) 2010)
17	Janne Mertanen (1)									Presence	(Note: J. Mertanen–Presence (PRECD–025) 2010)
18	Joseph Tong	1:40	2:14	2:19	1:38	3:01	10:52	2014	Jacqueline Du Pré Music Building	Quartz	(Note: J. Tong–Quartz (QTZ 2111) 2015)
19	Janne Mertanen (2)	1:44	2:29	2:14	1:35	3:07	11:09	2015	[Unknown], Helsinki	Sony Classical	(Note: J. Mertanen–Sony Classics (888751614222) 2015)
20	Eero Heinonen (2)	1:46	2:37	2:20	1:39	4:40	13:02	2015	Sello Hall, Espoo	Piano Classics	(Note: E. Heinonen–Piano Classics (PCL10220) 2020)

== Notes, references, and sources ==
Notes

Sources

- Barnett, Andrew (2007). Sibelius. New Haven: Yale University Press. ISBN 978-0-300-11159-0.
- Dahlström, Fabian [in Swedish] (2003). Jean Sibelius: Thematisch-bibliographisches Verzeichnis seiner Werke [Jean Sibelius: A Thematic Bibliographic Index of His Works] (in German). Wiesbaden: Breitkopf & Härtel. ISBN 3-7651-0333-0.
- Layton, Robert (1993) [1965]. Sibelius. (The Master Musicians Series) (4th ed.). New York: Schirmer Books. ISBN 0028713222.
