= Two Rondinos =

Two piano pieces by Jean Sibelius (1912)

- Piano solos by Jean Sibelius
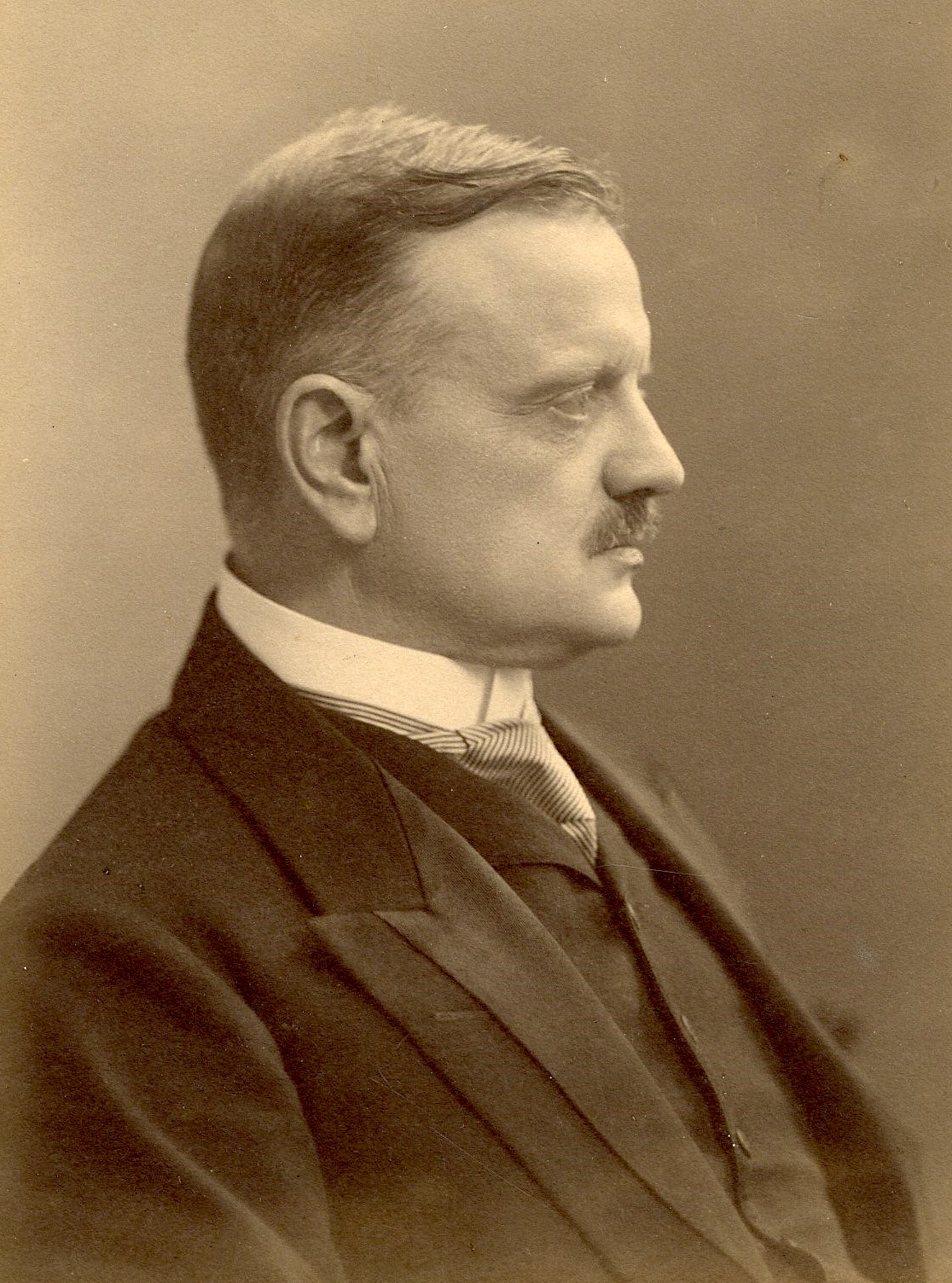
- The composer (1911)
- Opus: 68
- Composed: 1912
- Publisher: Universal Edition (1912)
- Duration: 5.75 mins

The Two Rondinos (in German: Zwei Rondinos), Op. 68, is a collection of compositions for piano written in November 1912 by the Finnish composer Jean Sibelius.

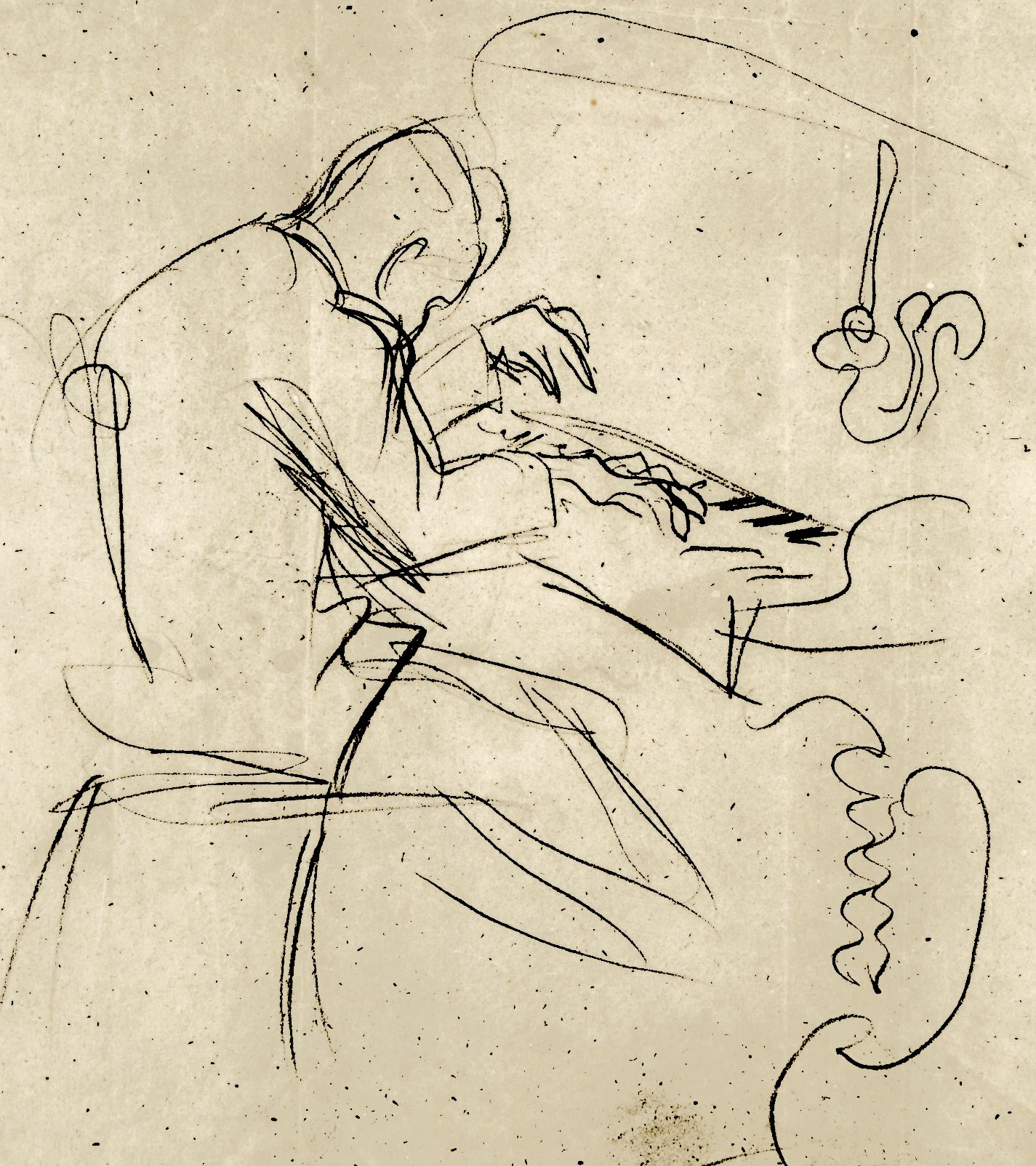
An 1892 sketch of Sibelius at the piano by his future brother-in-law Eero Järnefelt

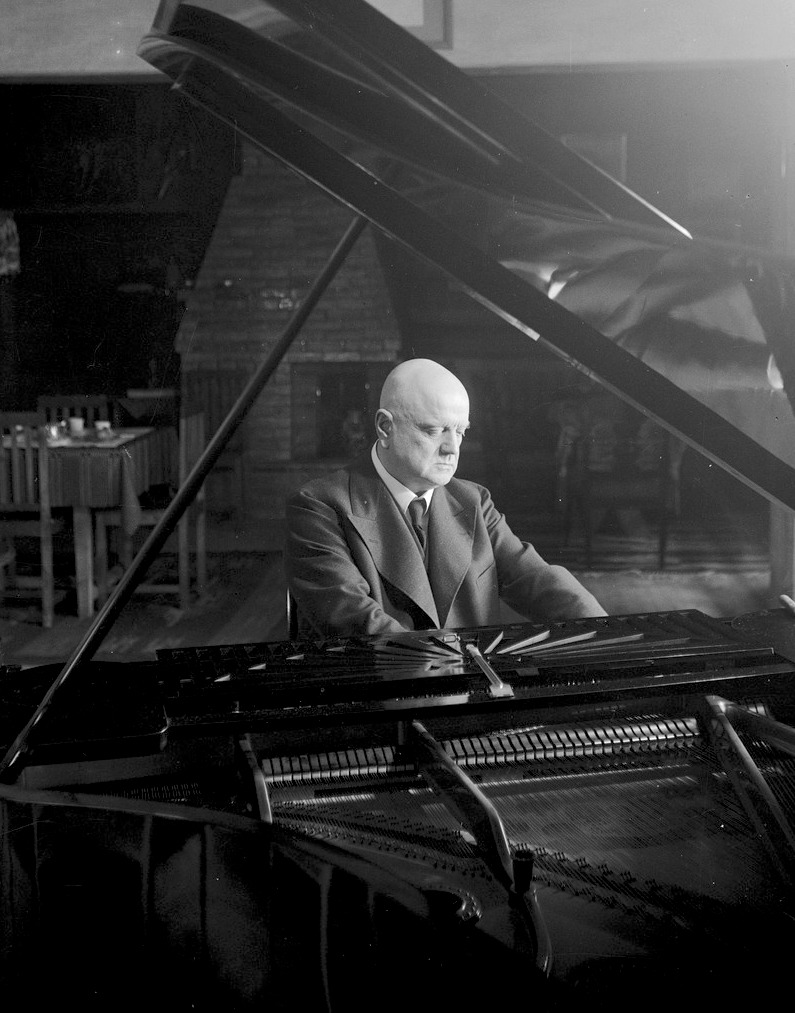
Sibelius (1927) plays the Steinway grand piano at his home, Ainola.

== Rondinos ==
The first rondino is in G♯ minor and begins with the tempo marking Andantino.

The second rondino is in C♯ minor and is marked Vivace.

== Reception ==
Robert Layton characterizes the Two Rondinos as "closely related ... in character" to the Three Sonatinas for solo piano from the same year, and as such, he endorses as "highly probable" the music lexicographer and critic Eric Blom's speculation that the rondinos might have originated as movements for an incomplete fourth sonatina, with the First Rondo serving as a central slow movement and the Second Rondino as "delightful finale."

== Discography ==
The Hungarian pianist Ervin László made the world premiere studio recording of Rondino No. 1 in 1959 for RCA Victor. In contrast, Rondino No. 2 was first recorded in 1971 by the Japanese pianist Izumi Tateno for EMI. The sortable table below lists this and other commercially available recordings of the Rondinos:

No.	Pianist	Runtimes (Note: All runtimes are official, as printed on CD or LP liner notes.)		Rec. (Note: Refers to the year in which the performers recorded the work; this may not be the same as the year in which the recording was first released to the general public.)	Recording venue	Label	Ref.
No.	Pianist	Op. 68/1	Op. 68/2	Rec.	Recording venue	Label	Ref.
1	Izumi Tateno	2:45	1:55	1971		EMI Classics	(Note: I. Tateno–EMI Classics (7491062) 1988)
2	Erik T. Tawaststjerna	3:39	1:59	1981	Studio BIS, Djursholm	BIS	(Note: E. Tawaststjerna–BIS (CD–196) 1987)
3	Marita Viitasalo	3:27	2:07	1994	Järvenpää Hall	Finlandia	(Note: M. Viitasalo–Finlandia (4509–98984–2) 1995)
4	Annette Servadei	3:07	1:55	1993	St George's Church, Brandon Hill	Olympia	(Note: A. Servadei–Olympia (OCD 633) 1997)
5	Eero Heinonen	3:32	1:55	1998	YLE M2 Studio, Helsinki	Finlandia	(Note: E. Heinonen–Finlandia (8573–80776–2) 2000)
6	Håvard Gimse	3:31	1:48	2000	St Martin's Church, East Woodhay	Naxos	(Note: H. Gimse–Naxos (8.554814) 2001)
7	Katriina Korte	2:59	1:56	2001	Järvenpää Hall	Alba	(Note: K. Korte–Alba (ABCA 159) 2001)
8	Olli Mustonen					Ondine	(Note: O. Mustonen–Ondine (ODE 1014–2) 2002)
9	Tuija Hakkila			2008	Nya Paviljongen	Alba	(Note: T. Hakkila–Alba (ABCD 297) 2010)
10	Folke Gräsbeck	3:16	1:56	2009	Kuusankoski Hall	BIS	(Note: F. Gräsbeck–BIS (CD–1927/29) 2010)
11	Joseph Tong	3:00	1:48	2014	Jacqueline Du Pré Music Building	Quartz	(Note: J. Tong–Quartz (QTZ 2111) 2015)
12	Janne Mertanen	4:16	1:45	2015	[Unknown], Helsinki	Sony Classical	(Note: J. Mertanen–Sony Classics (888751614222) 2015)
13	Terhi Dostal					Alba	(Note: T. Dostal–Label (ABCD 514) 2022)

== Notes, references, and sources ==
Notes

Sources

- Barnett, Andrew (2007). Sibelius. New Haven: Yale University Press. ISBN 978-0-300-11159-0.
- Dahlström, Fabian [in Swedish] (2003). Jean Sibelius: Thematisch-bibliographisches Verzeichnis seiner Werke [Jean Sibelius: A Thematic Bibliographic Index of His Works] (in German). Wiesbaden: Breitkopf & Härtel. ISBN 3-7651-0333-0.
- Layton, Robert (1993) [1965]. Sibelius. (The Master Musicians Series) (4th ed.). New York: Schirmer Books. ISBN 0028713222.
