= Five Pieces, Op. 85 (Sibelius) =

Five piano pieces by Jean Sibelius (1916–1917)

Five Pieces
- The Flowers
- Piano solos by Jean Sibelius
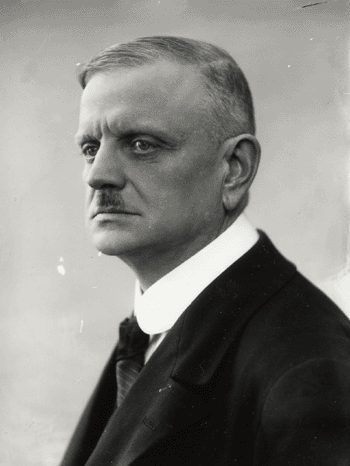
- The composer (c. 1918)
- Opus: 85
- Composed: 1916–1917
- Publisher: piecemeal by two firms
- Duration: 10 mins

The Five Pieces (in French: Cinq Morceaux), Op. 85, is a collection of compositions for piano written from 1916 to 1917 by the Finnish composer Jean Sibelius. The Five Pieces, however, is more commonly referred to by its informal nickname The Flowers due to the fact that the descriptive titles of the five pieces share a thematic link.

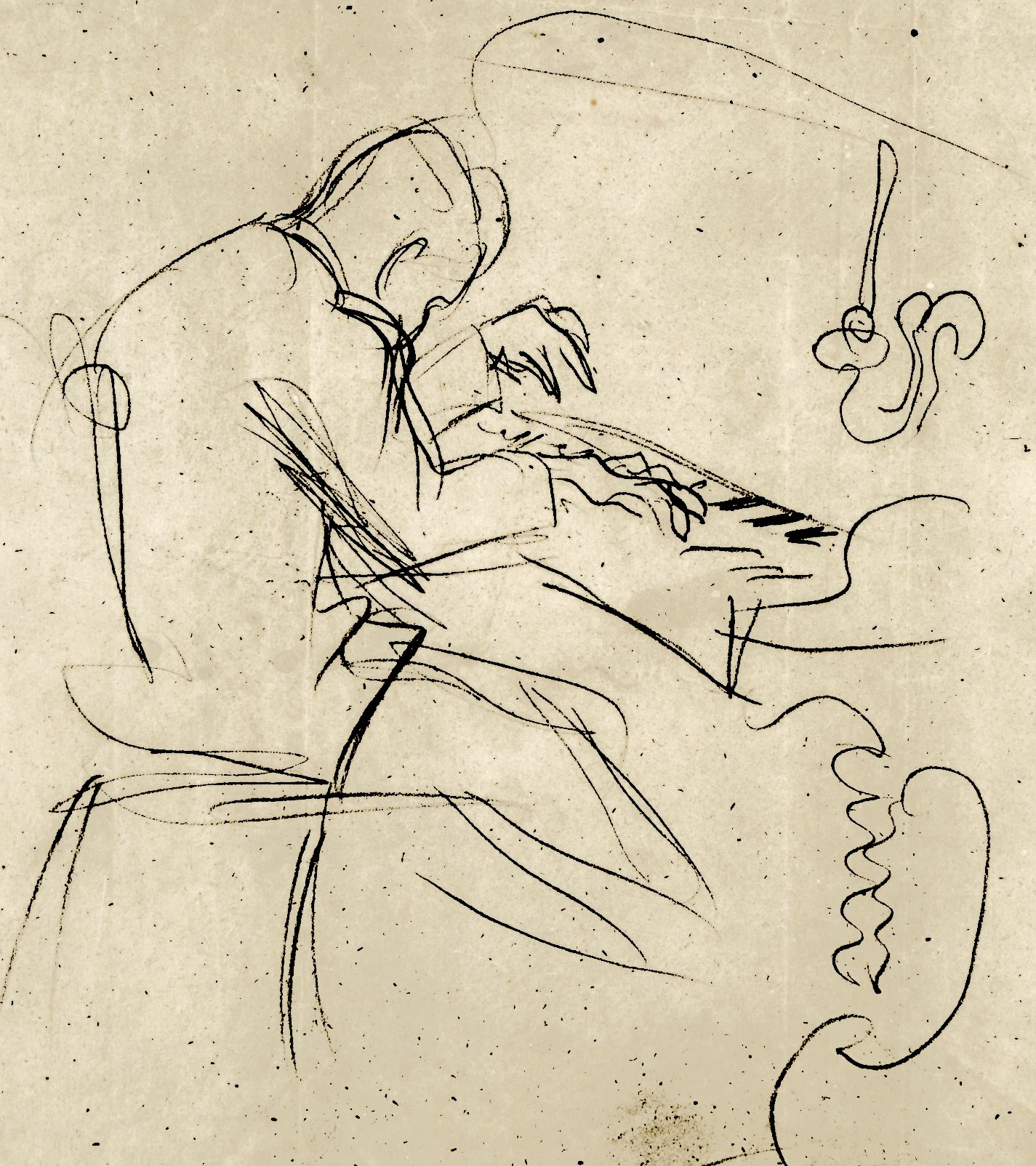
An 1892 sketch of Sibelius at the piano by his future brother-in-law Eero Järnefelt

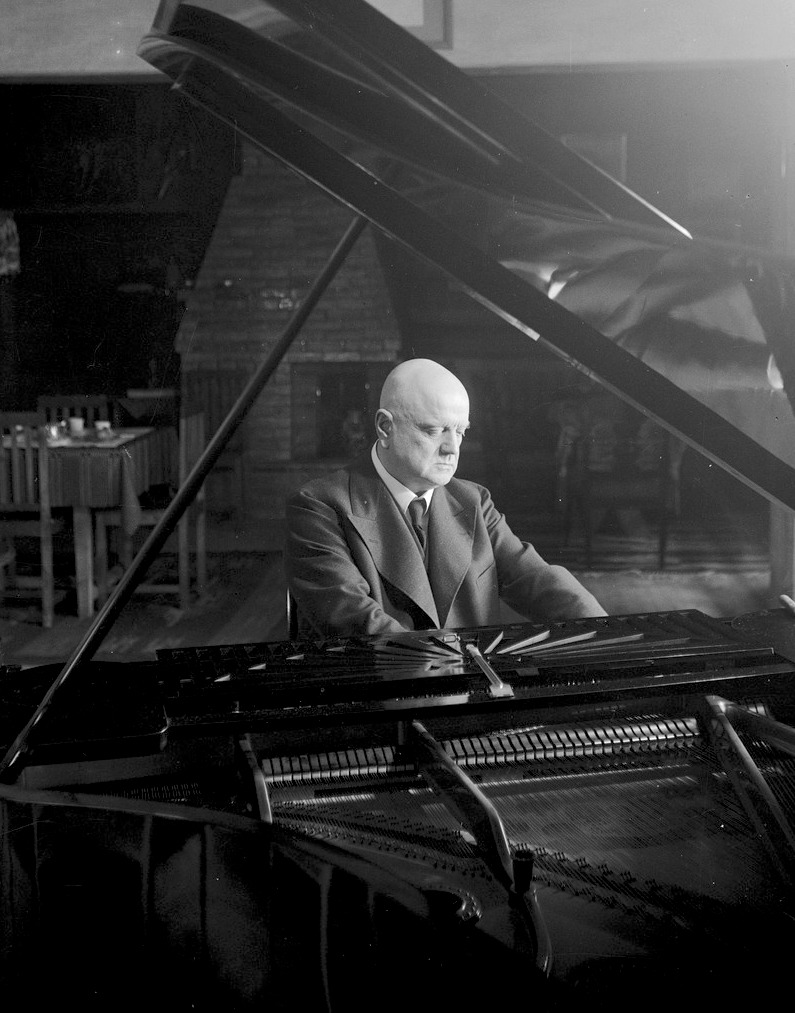
Sibelius (1927) plays the Steinway grand piano at his home, Ainola.

== Structure and music ==
=== No. 1: The Daisy ===
The Daisy (in French: Bellis; in Finnish: Kaunokki) was published in 1921 by the London-based firm of Augener & Co.. Marked Presto – Allegretto, it has a duration of about 1.5 minutes.

=== No. 2: The Carnation ===
The Carnation (in French: Œillet; in Finnish: Neilikka) was also published in 1921 by Augener. Marked Con moto, it has a duration of about 1.5 minutes.

=== No. 3: The Iris ===
The Iris (in French: Iris; in Finnish: Iiris) was published in 1921 by London's J. & W. Chester. Marked Allegretto e deciso, it has a duration of about three minutes.

=== No. 4: The Columbine ===
The Columbine (in French: Aquileja; in Finnish: Akileija) was also published in 1921 by Chester. Marked Allegretto, it has a duration of about 1.75 minutes.

=== No. 5: The Campanula ===
The Campanula (in French: Campanula; in Finnish Kellokukka) was also published in 1921 by Chester. Marked Andantino, it has a duration of about 2.25 minutes.

== Reception ==
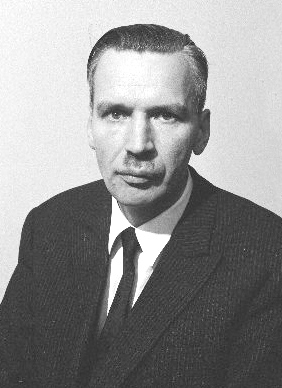
Erik Tawaststjerna, who authored seminal biography on Sibelius, was an early, vocal advocate for many of the composer's piano pieces.

== Discography ==
The Japanese pianist Izumi Tateno made the world premiere studio recording of the Op. 85 Five Pieces in 1971, albeit across two labels: Toshiba Records (TA 60103) released The Daisy and The Carnation (Nos. 1–2), while EMI (5E 063–34472) released The Iris, The Columbine, and The Campanula (Nos. 3–5). The sortable table below lists, in addition to the aforementioned Tateno traversal, other commercially available recordings of The Flowers, as a whole:

No.	Pianist	Runtimes (Note: All runtimes are official, as printed on CD or LP liner notes.)						Rec. (Note: Refers to the year in which the performers recorded the work; this may not be the same as the year in which the recording was first released to the general public.)	Recording venue	Label	Ref.
No.	Pianist	Op. 85/1	Op. 85/2	Op. 85/3	Op. 85/4	Op. 85/5	Total	Rec.	Recording venue	Label	Ref.
1	Izumi Tateno			2:55	2:00	2:00		1971		Toshiba + EMI	(Note: I. Tateno–Toshiba (TA 60103) 1971) (Note: I. Tateno–EMI (7491062) 1988)
2	Erik T. Tawaststjerna	1:19	1:34	2:57	1:46	2:12	10:09	1983	Studio BIS, Djursholm	BIS	(Note: E. Tawaststjerna–BIS (CD–230) 1987)
3	Marita Viitasalo	1:28	2:03	3:01	1:57	2:08	10:37	1992	Järvenpää Hall	Finlandia	(Note: M. Viitasalo–Finlandia (4509–95874–2) 1993)
4	Annette Servadei	1:25	2:06	3:28	1:42	2:21	11:02	1994	St George's Church, Brandon Hill	Olympia	(Note: A. Servadei–Olympia (OCD 634) 1997)
5	Izumi Tateno	1:15	1:45	3:05	1:52	2:08	10:05	1994	Ainola	Canyon Classics	(Note: I. Tateno–Canyon Classics (PCCL–00243) 1994)
6	Risto Lauriala	1:28	1:32	2:24	1:46	2:18	9:28	1995	Järvenpää Hall	Naxos	(Note: R. Lauriala–Naxos (8.553661) 1996)
7	Eero Heinonen	1:26	1:54	3:06	2:08	2:14	10:48	1997	YLE M2 Studio, Helsinki	Finlandia	(Note: E. Heinonen–Finlandia (8573–80776–2) 2000)
8	Kyoko Tabe	1:18	2:12	3:36	1:52	2:15	11:20	1999	New Broadcasting House, Manchester	Chandos	(Note: K. Tabe–Chandos (CHAN 9833) 2000)
9	Håvard Gimse	1:15	1:34	3:27	1:49	2:16	10:21	2000	St Martin's Church, East Woodhay	Naxos	(Note: H. Gimse–Naxos (8.555363) 2003)
10	Vladimir Ashkenazy							2007	Järvenpää Hall	Exton	(Note: V. Ashkenazy–Exton (EXCL–00017) 2008)
11	Tuija Hakkila							2008	Nya Paviljongen	Alba	(Note: T. Hakkila–Alba (ABCD 297) 2010)
12	Folke Gräsbeck (1)	1:19	1:47	3:34	2:11	2:08	11:14	2009	Kuusankoski Hall	BIS	(Note: F. Gräsbeck–BIS (CD–1927/29) 2010)
13	Folke Gräsbeck (2)	1:19	1:43	3:11	2:13	2:15	10:55	2014	Ainola	BIS	(Note: F. Gräsbeck–BIS (SACD–2132) 2015)
14	Joseph Tong	1:15	1:54	3:22	1:36	2:37	10:44	2014	Jacqueline Du Pré Music Building	Quartz	(Note: J. Tong–Quartz (QTZ 2111) 2015)
15	Janne Mertanen	1:15	1:34	3:19	1:37	2:23	10:08	2015	[Unknown], Helsinki	Sony Classical	(Note: J. Mertanen–Sony Classics (888751614222) 2015)

== Notes, references, and sources ==
Notes

Sources

- Barnett, Andrew (2007). Sibelius. New Haven: Yale University Press. ISBN 978-0-300-11159-0.
- Dahlström, Fabian [in Swedish] (2003). Jean Sibelius: Thematisch-bibliographisches Verzeichnis seiner Werke [Jean Sibelius: A Thematic Bibliographic Index of His Works] (in German). Wiesbaden: Breitkopf & Härtel. ISBN 3-7651-0333-0.
- Layton, Robert (1993) [1965]. Sibelius. (The Master Musicians Series) (4th ed.). New York: Schirmer Books. ISBN 0028713222.
