= Three Sonatinas =

Three multi-movement piano pieces by Jean Sibelius (1912)

- Piano solos by Jean Sibelius
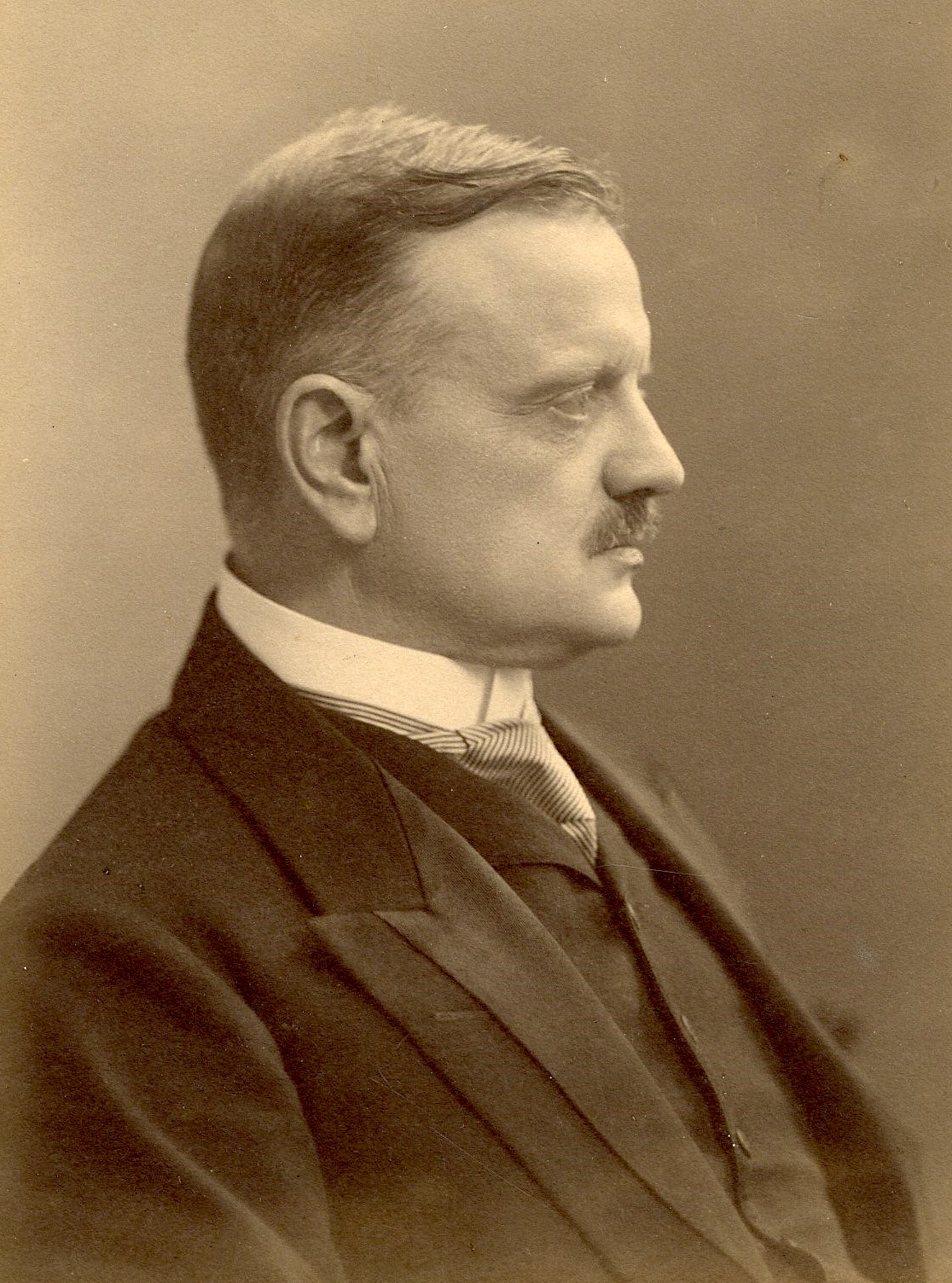
- The composer (1911)
- Opus: 67
- Composed: 1912
- Publisher: Breitkopf & Härtel (1912)
- Duration: No. 1: 7.25 mins; No. 2: 5.5 mins; No. 3: 6.5 mins

The Three Sonatinas (in German: Drei Sonatinen), Op. 67, is a collection of compositions for piano written in July 1912 by the Finnish composer Jean Sibelius.

== History ==
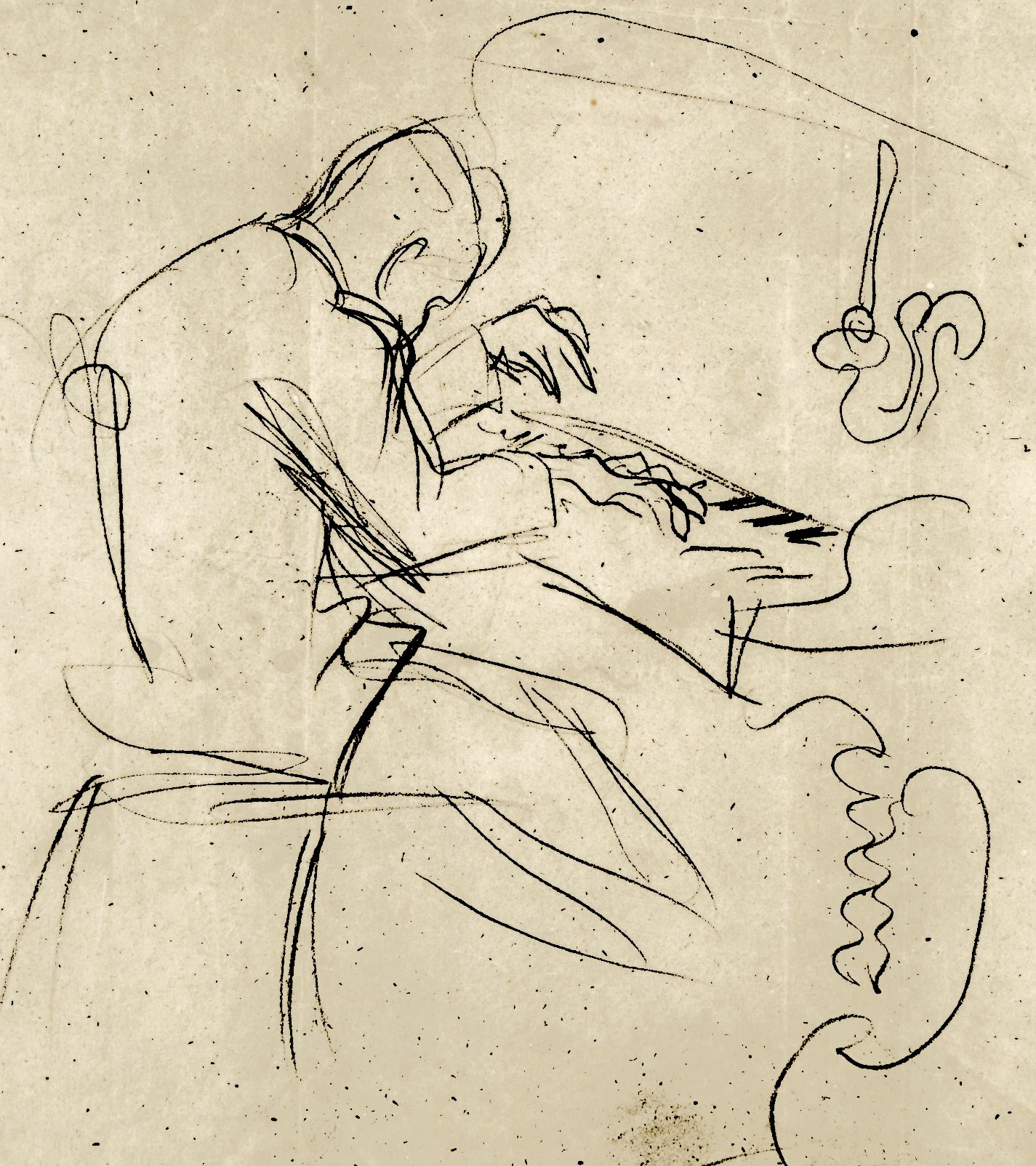
An 1892 sketch of Sibelius at the piano by his future brother-in-law Eero Järnefelt

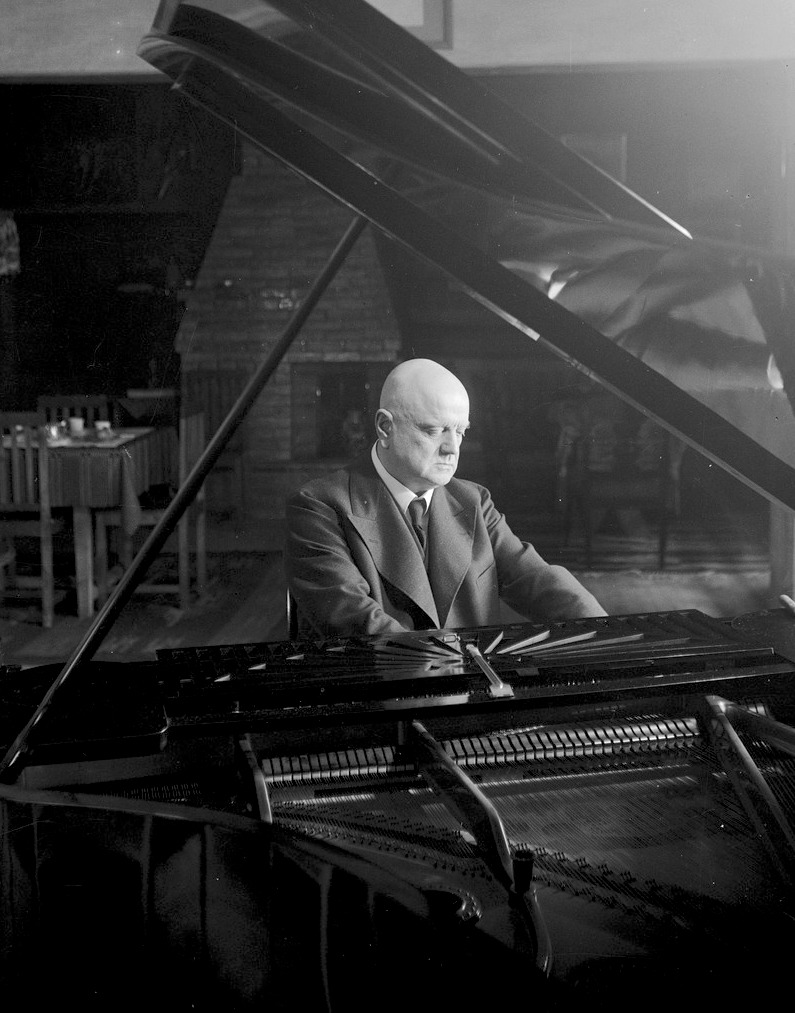
Sibelius (1927) plays the Steinway grand piano at his home, Ainola.

In 1912 Sibelius found himself creatively at a crossroads, still searching for his next major project in the wake of the Symphony No. 4 in A minor (Op. 63), which he had premiered the previous April in Helsinki. He considered composing one to two orchestral fantasies or, alternatively, a new symphony. Moreover, he toyed with the idea of, finally, undertaking a large-scale opera (The Maiden in the Tower, JS 101, from 1896 had been a brief, one-acter), after the Finnish operatic soprano Aino Ackté and Jalmari Finne had approached him with a libretto.

== Structure and music ==
=== Sonatina No. 1 ===
The First Sonatina is in F♯ minor and has three movements:

1. Allegro
2. Largo
3. Allegro moderato

=== Sonatina No. 2 ===
The Second Sonatina is in E major and also has three movements:

1. Allegro
2. Andantino
3. Allegro

=== Sonatina No. 3 ===
The Third Sonatina is in B♭ minor and has two movements, although some commentators consider the Allegretto (bar 39) in Movement II to be sufficiently distinct in its thematic material that it constitutes a de facto third movement:

1. Andante – Allegro moderato
2. Andante – Allegretto

== Reception ==
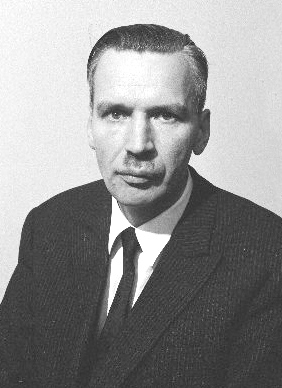
Erik Tawaststjerna, who authored seminal biography on Sibelius, was an early, vocal advocate for many of the composer's piano pieces.

Robert Layton characterizes the Three Sonatinas as "probably Sibelius's most convincing keyboard works. They are compact in design and economical in utterance ... the suitability of the ideas to the medium ... shows a considerable advance over Sibelius's earlier work". Indeed, Layton proclaims the First Sonatina as "the most perfect" composition in Sibelius's entire output for solo piano, although "the remaining two ... are very nearly as fine".

== Discography ==
External audio
- Sonatina No. 1, performed by Janne Mertanen
- I. Allegro
- II. Largo
- III. Allegro moderato

External audio
- Sonatina No. 2, performed by Janne Mertanen
- I. Allegro
- II. Andantino
- III. Allegro

External audio
- Sonatina No. 3, performed by Janne Mertanen
- I. Andante – Allegro moderato
- IIa. Andante
- IIb. Allegretto

The Hungarian pianist Ervin László made the world premiere studio recording of the Three Sonatinas in 1959 for RCA Victor. The sortable table below lists this and other commercially available recordings of the Sonatinas:

No.	Pianist	Runtimes (Note: All runtimes are official, as printed on CD or LP liner notes.)			Rec. (Note: Refers to the year in which the performers recorded the work; this may not be the same as the year in which the recording was first released to the general public.)	Recording venue	Label	Ref.
No.	Pianist	Op. 67/1	Op. 67/2	Op. 67/3	Rec.	Recording venue	Label	Ref.
1	Ervin László						RCA Red Seal	(Note: [ E. László–RCA Red Seal () yyyy])
2	Izumi Tateno	6:25	5:25	–	1971		EMI Classics	(Note: I. Tateno–EMI Classics (7491062) 1988)
3	Glenn Gould	10:53	7:10	7:24	1977	Eaton's Auditorium	Sony Classical	(Note: G. Gould–Sony Classical (SM2K 52 654) 2002)
4	David Rubenstein	6:09	4:50	4:52			Musical Heritage Society	(Note: D. Rubenstein–Musical Heritage Society (MHS 1218) 1977)
5	Erik T. Tawaststjerna	7:15	5:42	6:22	1981	Studio BIS, Djursholm	BIS	(Note: E. Tawaststjerna–BIS (CD–196) 1987)
6	Viktoria Postnikova	10:52	6:32	8:27			Melodiya	(Note: V. Postnikova–Label (С10–22413/4) 1985)
7	Annette Servadei	7:43	6:35	7:45	1993	St George's Church, Brandon Hill	Olympia	(Note: A. Servadei–Olympia (OCD 633) 1997)
8	Marita Viitasalo	7:55	6:34	7:30	1994	Järvenpää Hall	Finlandia	(Note: M. Viitasalo–Finlandia (4509–98984–2) 1995)
9	Eero Heinonen	7:13	5:57	6:20	1996	YLE M2 Studio, Helsinki	Finlandia	(Note: E. Heinonen–Finlandia (8573–80776–2) 2000)
10	Håvard Gimse	6:58	5:40	6:33	2000	St Martin's Church, East Woodhay	Naxos	(Note: H. Gimse–Naxos (8.554814) 2001)
11	Katriina Korte	7:08	6:18	6:38	2001	Järvenpää Hall	Alba	(Note: K. Korte–Alba (ABCA 159) 2001)
12	Folke Gräsbeck	7:04	5:37	5:23	2009	Kuusankoski Hall	BIS	(Note: F. Gräsbeck–BIS (CD–1927/29) 2010)
13	Joseph Tong	6:34	5:39	5:36	2014	Jacqueline Du Pré Music Building	Quartz	(Note: J. Tong–Quartz (QTZ 2123) 2017)
14	Janne Mertanen	7:02	6:07	5:53	2015	[Unknown], Helsinki	Sony Classical	(Note: J. Mertanen–Sony Classics (888751614222) 2015)
15	Terhi Dostal	7:01	5:41	6:23	2022	RBB Sall 3, Berlin	Hänssler Classic	(Note: T. Dostal–Hänssler Classic (HC23048) 2022)

== Notes, references, and sources ==
Notes

Sources

- Barnett, Andrew (2007). Sibelius. New Haven: Yale University Press. ISBN 978-0-300-11159-0.
- Dahlström, Fabian [in Swedish] (2003). Jean Sibelius: Thematisch-bibliographisches Verzeichnis seiner Werke [Jean Sibelius: A Thematic Bibliographic Index of His Works] (in German). Wiesbaden: Breitkopf & Härtel. ISBN 3-7651-0333-0.
- Layton, Robert (1993) [1965]. Sibelius. (The Master Musicians Series) (4th ed.). New York: Schirmer Books. ISBN 0028713222.
