= Ten Pieces, Op. 24 (Sibelius) =

Ten piano pieces by Jean Sibelius (1895–1903)

Ten Pieces
- Piano solos by Jean Sibelius
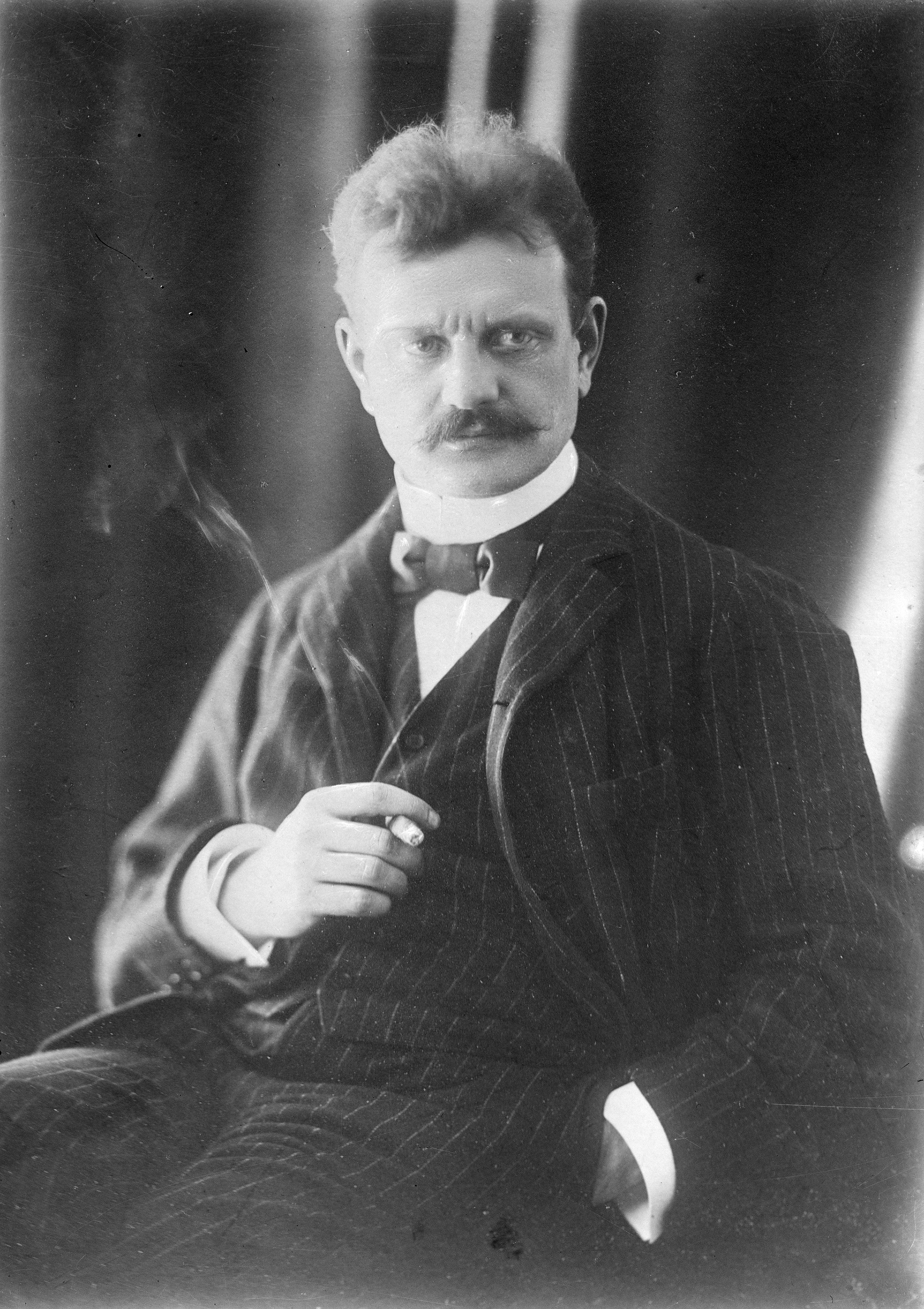
- The composer (c. 1902)
- Opus: 24
- Composed: 1895–1903
- Publisher: piecemeal by three firms: Lindgren (Nos. 1–2, 4–5); Wasenius (3, 7–8); Fazer & Westerlund (6, 9–10)
- Duration: 38.5 mins

The Ten Pieces (Finnish: Kymmenen kappaletta; in German: Zehn Stücke), Op. 24, is a collection of compositions for piano written by the Finnish composer Jean Sibelius around the turn of the twentieth century, variously from 1895 to 1903. The most famous piece of the set is by far No. 9, the Romance in D♭ major.

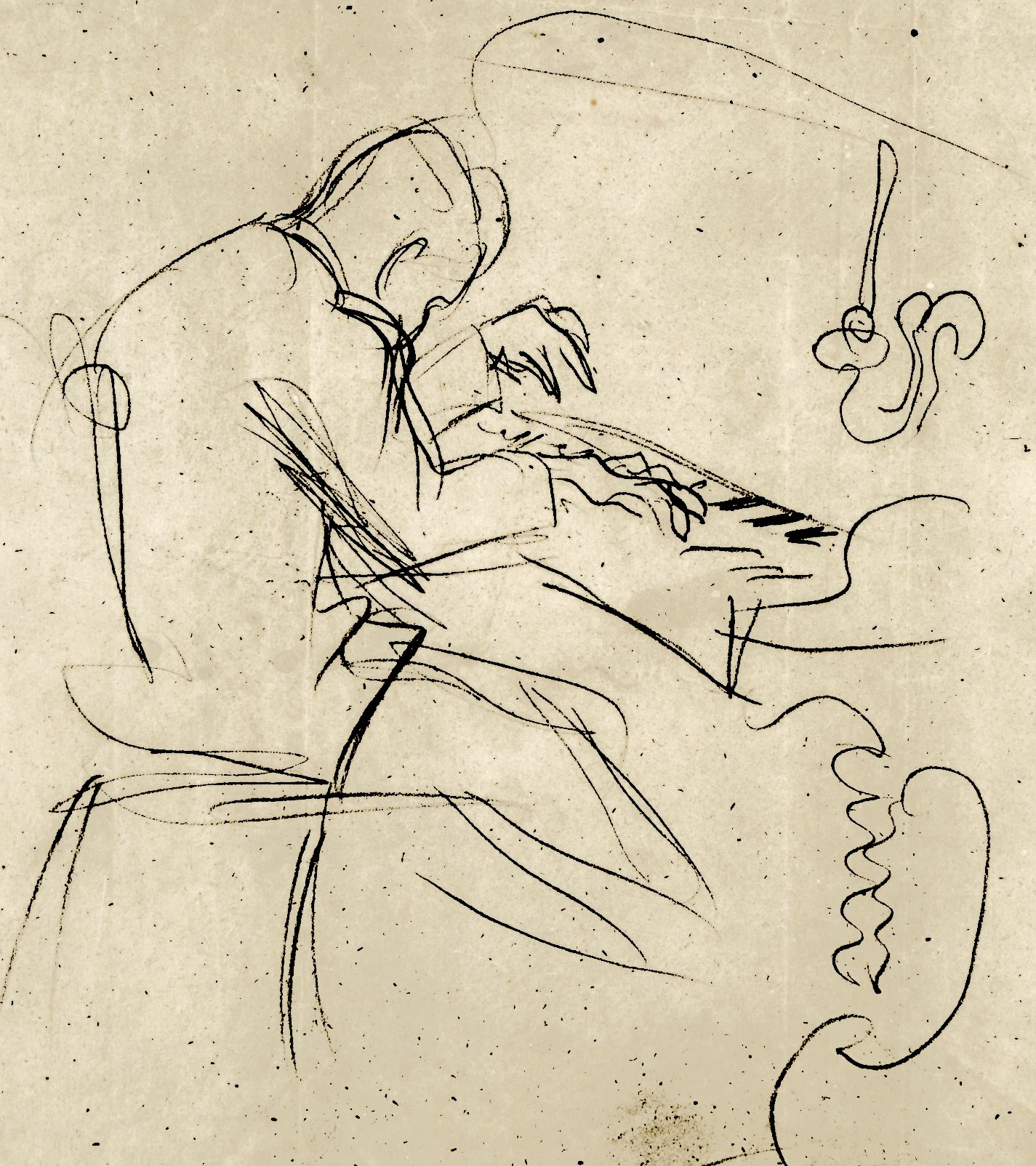
An 1892 sketch of Sibelius at the piano by his future brother-in-law Eero Järnefelt

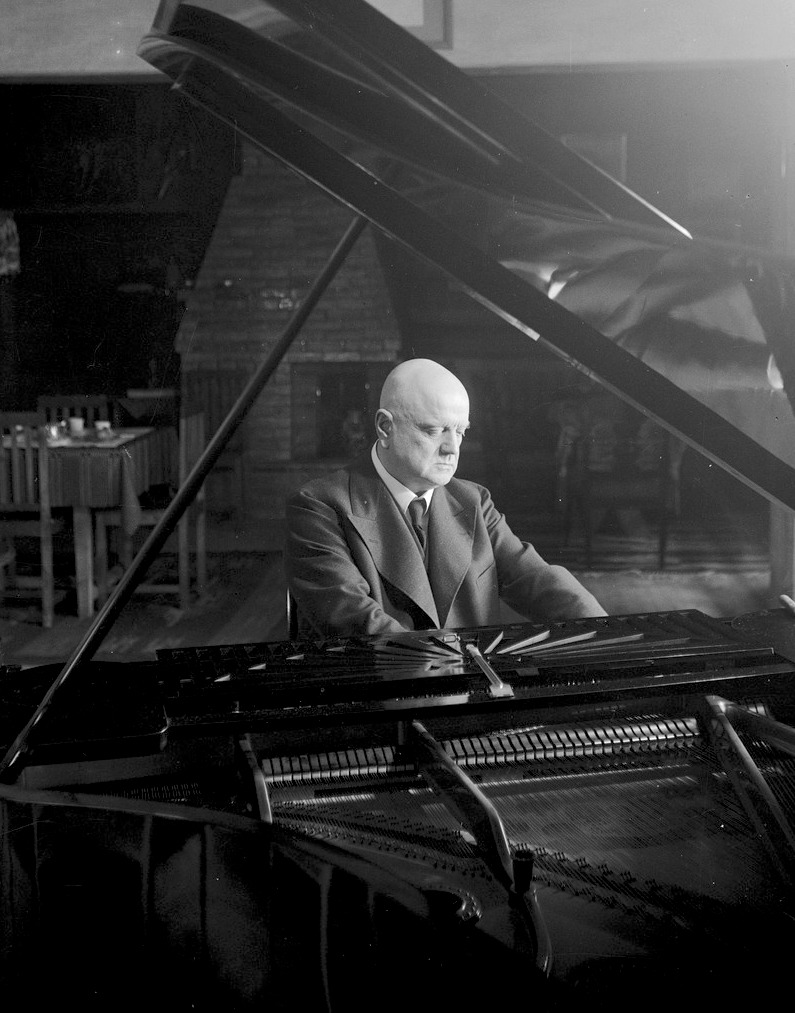
Sibelius (1927) plays the Steinway grand piano at his home, Ainola.

== Structure and music ==
=== No. 1: Impromptu ===
Sibelius composed the Impromptu in G minor during the summer of 1895 while vacationing with his family (Note: At the time, Jean and Aino Sibelius had two (of their, eventual, six) daughters: Eva (1893–1978) and Ruth (1894–1969).) in Vaania by Lake Vesijärvi, despite the fact that the cottage they had rented did not contain a piano. Marked Vivace and in 3/4 time, it has a duration of about four minutes; it was first published in 1895 by Helsinki's Axel E. Lindgren. The Sibelius biographer Andrew Barnett notes that the Impromptu "opens in a tumultuous, scherzo-like mood" before slowing into a "brooding waltz" that in some ways anticipates Sibelius's most famous composition, Valse triste (Op. 44/1), an orchestral work that he arranged in 1904 from the incidental music to Kuolema (Death, 1903).

=== No. 2: Romance (A major) ===
Sibelius composed the Romance (in Finnish: Romanssi) in A major in 1895, alongside the Impromptu. Marked Andantino and in 6/4 time, it has a duration of about eight minutes—making it the longest of the Ten Pieces; it was first published in 1895 by Lindgren. According to the Sibelius biographer Barnett, the Romance in A major "has the scale and emotional range of a tone poem": its opening is reminiscent of a "sinister barcarole", while afterwards it "evolves into an intensely dramatic mood painting ... [it] bears the hallmarks of Sibelius's musical Symbolism and of the forthcoming Lemminkäinen Suite" (Op. 22), an orchestral work that dominated his thinking in the mid-1890s. (Note: Barnett further speculates that, perhaps, the Romance in A major—like some material from the Lemminkäinen Suite—may have emerged from the "shattered fragments" of Sibelius's abandoned opera project, The Building of the Boat.)

=== No. 3: Caprice ===
Sibelius composed the Caprice (in Finnish: Kapriisi) in E minor in 1898. Marked Vivace and in 6/8 time, it has a duration of about three minutes. It was first published in 1898 by Helsinki's Karl Wasenius.

=== No. 4: Romance (D minor) ===
Sibelius composed the Romance (in Finnish: Romanssi) in D minor at some point between 1896 and 1898. Marked Tranquillo and in 3/4 time, it has a duration of about three minutes. It was first published in 1898 by Lindgren.

=== No. 5: Valse ===
Sibelius composed the Valse (in Finnish: Valssi) in E major c. 1898. Marked Vivace and in 3/4 time, it has a duration of about three minutes. It was first published in 1898 by Lindgren.

=== No. 6: Idyll ===
In December 1897, Sibelius composed an Andantino in F major (6/8 time) as a Christmas present for his brother-in-law, the Finnish painter Eero Järnefelt. In 1898, he reworked and lengthened the "gentle, berceuse-like" as Op. 24's Idyll, adding a "lavishly embellished central section", as well as a brief, four-bar ending that recapitulates the opening theme. Idyll it has a duration of about three minutes and was first published in 1899 by the Helsinki-based firm of Fazer & Westerlund (Helsingfors nya musikhandel). However, in July 1904, Sibelius was compelled to revise the piece: a letter from Fazer (earlier that year, Westerlund had left to establish his own firm) informed him that, by mistake, the copyright had not been registered for the 1898 composition, thus necessitating minor changes in order to protect Sibelius's intellectual property. This version—which is also three-minutes long—was later that year in September by Leipzig's Breitkopf & Härtel, which on 20 July 1905, had purchased all of Fazer's Sibelius holdings (the publishing rights and printing plates).

=== No. 7: Andantino ===
Sibelius composed the Andantino in F major (the only of the Ten Pieces to be called by its tempo marking) in 1899. In 9/4 time, it has a duration of about three minutes, and was first published in 1899 by Wasenius. Afterwards, however, Sibelius revised the piece c. 1899, which necessitated a superseding edition by Wasenius in 1900.

=== No. 8: Nocturno ===
Sibelius composed the Nocturno in E minor in 1900. Marked Andante and in 2/2 time, it has a duration of about three minutes. It was first published in 1901 by Wasenius.

=== No. 9: Romance (D♭ major) ===
Sibelius composed the Romance (in Finnish: Romanssi) in D♭ major in December 1901. Marked Andantino and in 3/4 time, it has a duration of about four minutes and was first published in 1902 Fazer & Westerlund. The D♭ major Romance is by far the most popular and oft-recorded of the Ten Pieces, as well as one of the most ubiquitous compositions in Sibelius's entire oeuvre for solo piano.

=== No. 10: Barcarola ===
Sibelius composed the Barcarola in G minor in 1903. Marked Moderato assai and in 3/4 time, it has a duration of about 4.5 minutes. It was first published in 1903 by Fazer & Westerlund.

== Reception ==
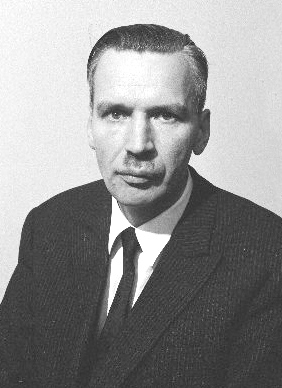
Erik Tawaststjerna, who authored seminal biography on Sibelius, was an early, vocal advocate for many of the composer's piano pieces.

The musicologist Robert Layton argues that the Ten Pieces are a mixed bag, although the "best of them are probably more personal than" their immediate predecessor, the Piano Sonata in F major (Op. 12, 1893). On the one hand, he dismisses the famous Romance in D-flat major (No. 9) as "hackneyed ... with its stale rhetoric and trite, salon-like tune". Layton does, however, describe the Impromptu (No. 1), the Nocturno (No. 8), and the Barcarola (No. 10) as "characteristic" and "highly individual"—although each "betrays orchestral habits of mind and poses the question whether some of Sibelius's piano pieces did not begin life as orchestral sketches".

== Discography ==
The Finnish pianist Erik T. Tawaststjerna made the first studio recording of the complete Ten Pieces in 1980 for BIS; of these, Nos. 1–2, 4, and 6–8 were world premieres. The remaining four compositions had been recorded earlier, with premieres as follows: No. 5 by the Danish pianist Helge Bonnén on Polyphon (NS 47002, 1925); No. 9 by the Australian pianist Eileen Joyce for Parlophone (E 111424, 1939); No. 3 by the Hungarian pianist Ervin László for RCA (LM–9829, 1959); and No. 10 by the Finnish pianist Ralf Gothóni for EMI (5E 063 34283, 1971). The sortable table below lists, in addition to the aforementioned Tawaststjerna traversal, other commercially available recordings of the complete Ten Pieces:

No.	Pianist	Runtimes (Note: All runtimes are official, as printed on CD or LP liner notes.)											Rec. (Note: Refers to the year in which the performers recorded the work; this may not be the same as the year in which the recording was first released to the general public.)	Recording venue	Label	Ref.
No.	Pianist	Op. 24/1	Op. 24/2	Op. 24/3	Op. 24/4	Op. 24/5	Op. 24/6	Op. 24/7	Op. 24/8	Op. 24/9	Op. 24/10	Total	Rec.	Recording venue	Label	Ref.
1	Erik T. Tawaststjerna	4:01	7:30	3:10	3:03	2:33	3:10	2:35	3:14	4:00	4:27	38:35	1980	Nacka Aula, Nacka	BIS	(Note: E. Tawaststjerna–BIS (CD–169) 1987)
2	Annette Servadei	2:59	7:24	2:58	3:12	2:22	3:42	2:51	3:06	4:10	4:13	37:18	1992	Christ's Hospital, Horsham	Olympia	(Note: A. Servadei–Olympia (OCD 631) 1997)
3	Eero Heinonen (1)	4:54	6:49	3:14	3:53	2:03	3:29	3:09	3:52	3:52	5:05	40:20	1995	YLE M2 Studio, Helsinki	Finlandia	(Note: E. Heinonen–Finlandia (8573–80776–2) 2000)
4	Håvard Gimse	3:31	6:50	2:39	2:56	2:04	3:04	2:33	2:57	2:55	4:24	34:06	1997	St Martin's Church, East Woodhay	Naxos	(Note: H. Gimse–Naxos (8.553899) 1999)
5	Folke Gräsbeck	4:53	6:52	3:07	3:48	2:16	4:00	3:45	3:35	3:46	4:46	41:34	2006	Kuusankoski Concert Hall	BIS	(Note: F. Gräsbeck–BIS (CD–1909/11) 2008)
6	Janne Mertanen	4:23	7:09	2:52	3:24	2:01	3:29	3:23	3:29	3:48	4:57	38:55	2015	[Unknown], Helsinki	Sony Classical	(Note: J. Mertanen–Sony Classics (888751614222) 2015)
7	Eero Heinonen (2)	4:07	6:01	2:49	3:21	2:01	3:14	2:55	3:27	3:42	4:38	36:15	2015	Sello Hall, Espoo	Piano Classics	(Note: E. Heinonen–Piano Classics (PCL10220) 2020)

== Notes, references, and sources ==
Notes

Sources

- Barnett, Andrew (2007). Sibelius. New Haven: Yale University Press. ISBN 978-0-300-11159-0.
- Dahlström, Fabian [in Swedish] (2003). Jean Sibelius: Thematisch-bibliographisches Verzeichnis seiner Werke [Jean Sibelius: A Thematic Bibliographic Index of His Works] (in German). Wiesbaden: Breitkopf & Härtel. ISBN 3-7651-0333-0.
- Layton, Robert (1993) [1965]. Sibelius. (The Master Musicians Series) (4th ed.). New York: Schirmer Books. ISBN 0028713222.
