= Six Impromptus =

Six piano pieces by Jean Sibelius (1892)

- Piano solos by Jean Sibelius
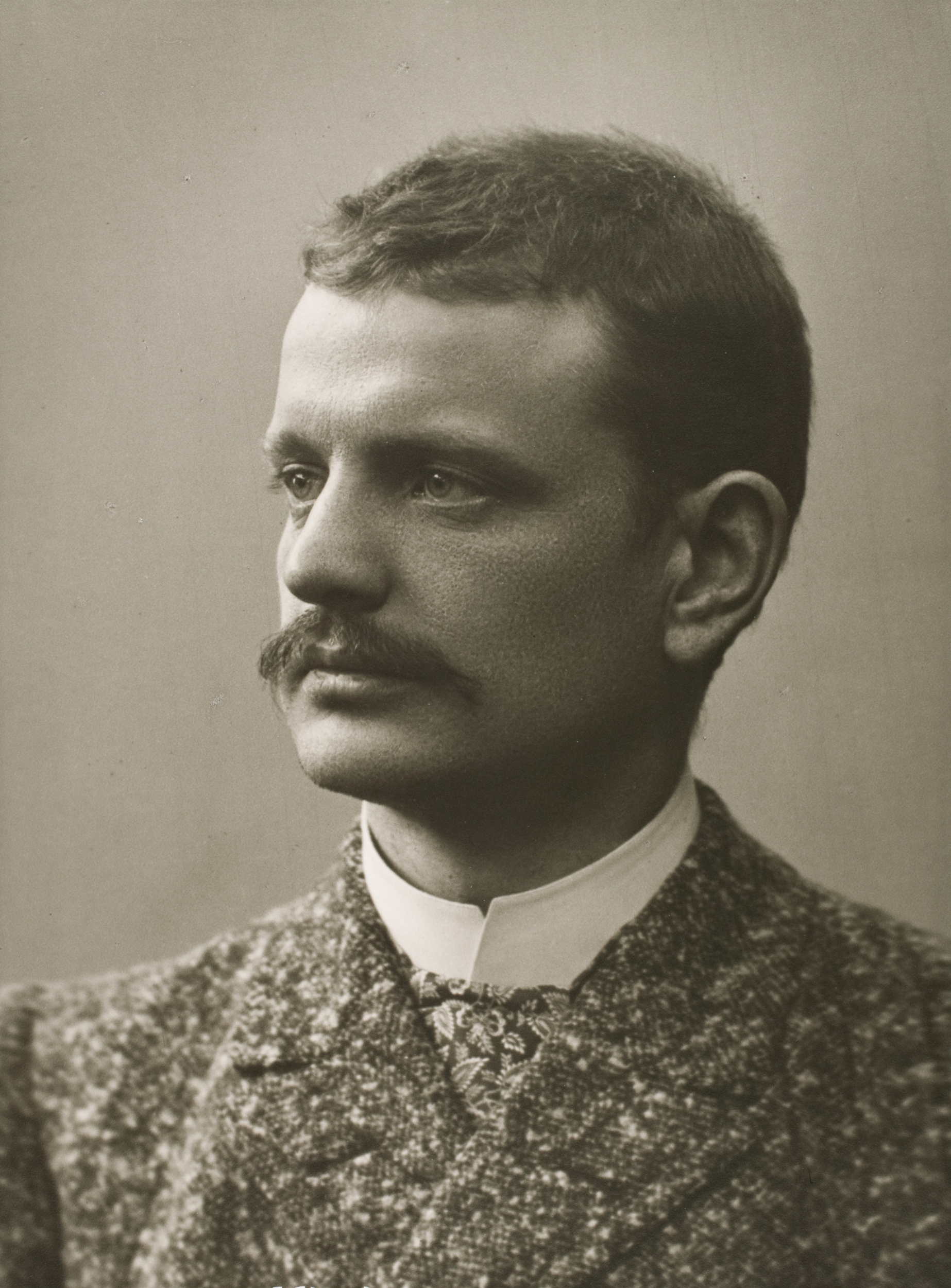
- The composer (c. 1891)
- Opus: 5
- Composed: 1893
- Publisher: Axel E. Lindgren (1894)
- Duration: 14.5 mins

The Six Impromptus (in German: Sechs Impromptus), Op. 5, is a collection of compositions for piano written in 1893 by the Finnish composer Jean Sibelius.

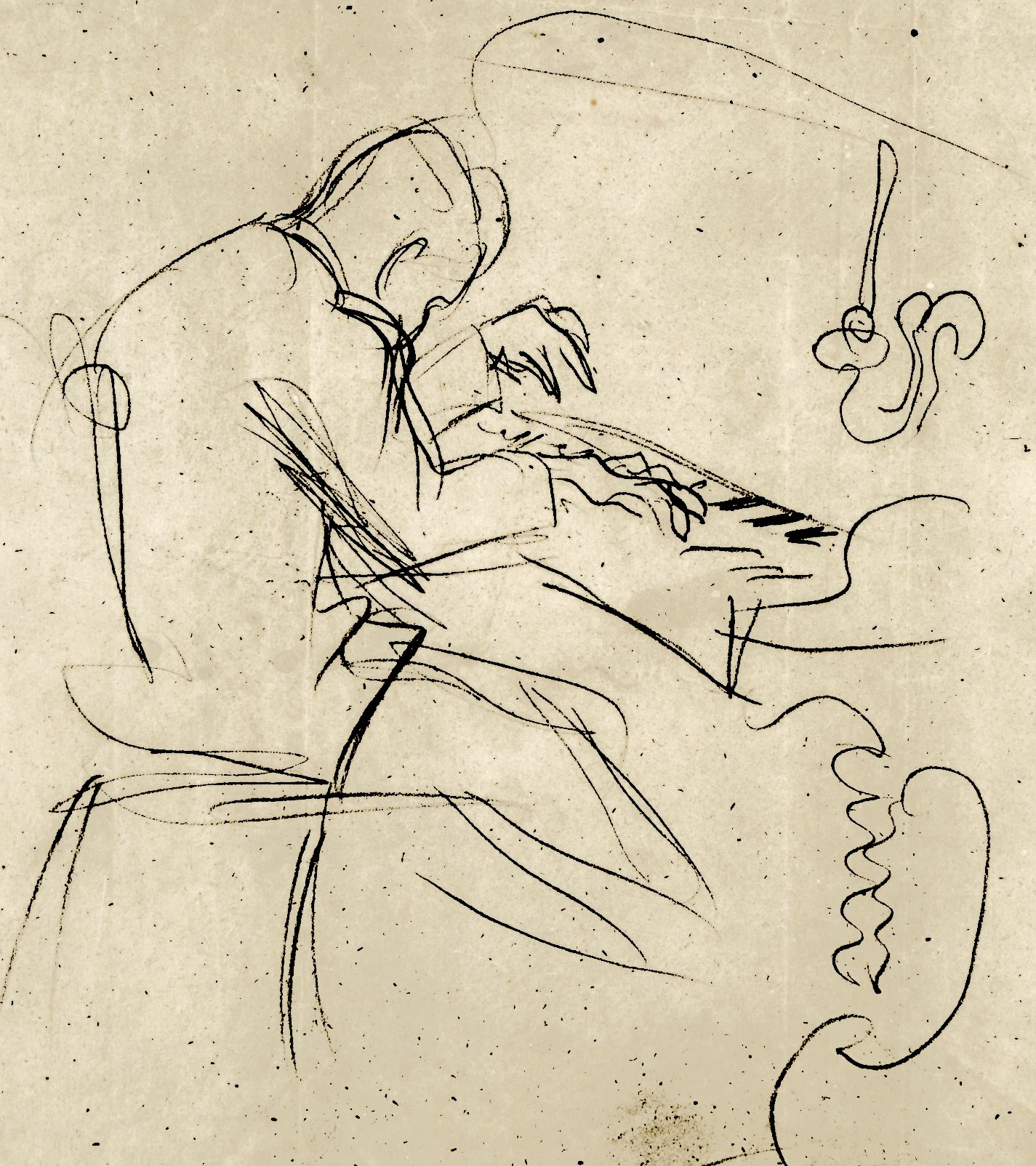
1892 sketch of Sibelius at the piano by his future brother-in-law Eero Järnefelt

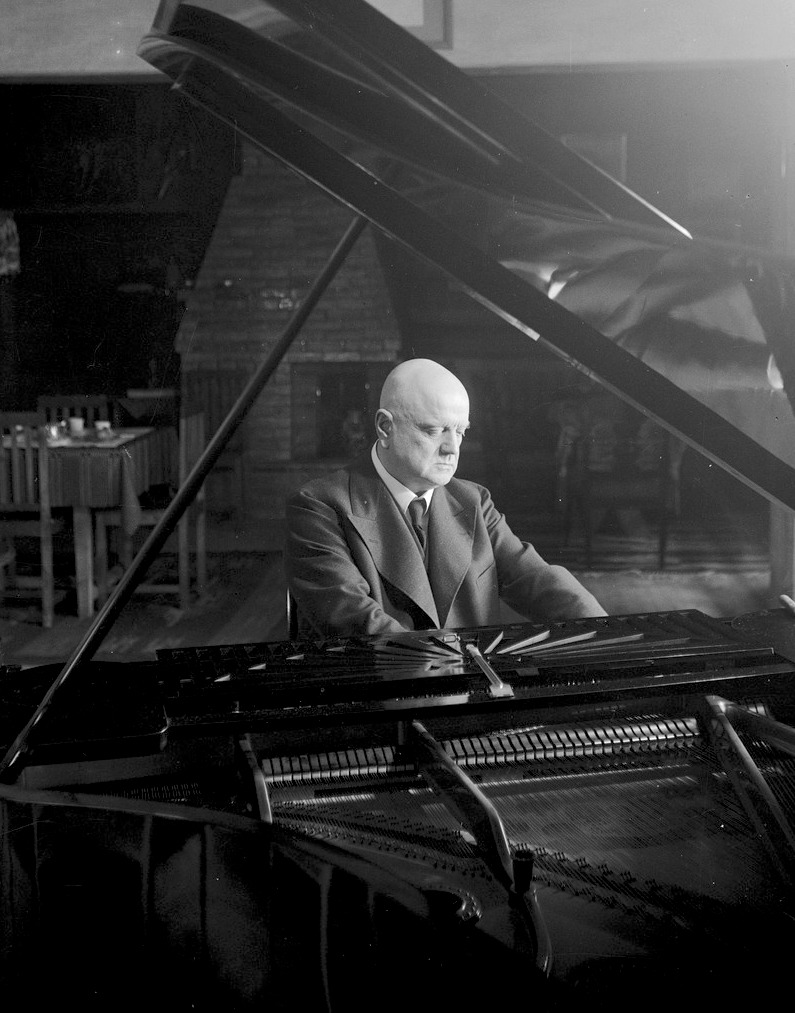
Sibelius (1927) plays the Steinway grand piano at his home, Ainola.

== Structure and music ==
Impromptu No. 1
The first impromptu is in G minor. Marked Moderato, it has a duration of about two minutes.
Impromptu No. 2
The second impromptu is also in G minor. Marked Lento – Vivace, it has a duration of about two minutes.
Impromptu No. 3
The third impromptu is in A minor. Marked Moderato (alla marcia), it has a duration of about three minutes.
Impromptu No. 4
The fourth impromptu is in E minor. Marked Andantino, it has a duration of about two minutes.
Impromptu Nos. 5 and 6
The fifth impromptu is in B minor. Marked Vivace, it has a duration of about 3.5 minutes, The sixth impromptu, on the other hand, is in E major; marked Comodo, it lasts about two minutes. In 1893, Sibelius reused themes from Nights of Jealousy (Svartsjukans nätter, JS 125)—an 1893 melodrama for narrator, vocalise soprano, and piano trio to poems by J. L. Runeberg–for Nos. 5–6 of the Six Impromptus. In 1894, he combined the fifth and sixth impromptus into an arrangement for string orchestra and titled the new piece Impromptu.

== Reception ==
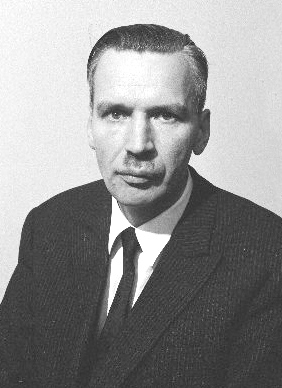
Erik Tawaststjerna, who authored seminal biography on Sibelius, was an early, vocal advocate for many of the composer's piano pieces.

Robert Layton dismisses the Six Impromptus as "for the most part ... feeble and uninventive".

== Discography ==
The Finnish pianist Erik T. Tawaststjerna made the first studio recording of the complete Six Impromptus in 1979 for BIS; of these, Nos. 3–4 were world premieres. The remaining four pieces had been recorded earlier, with premieres as follows: No. 1–2 by the Swedish pianist Stig Ribbing on His Master's Voice (HMV 7 EBS 5, 1956); No. 6 by the German pianist Horst Minkofski-Garrigues for Telefunken-Decca for (MG 4468, 1968); and No. 5 by the Japanese pianist Izumi Tateno on EMI (5E 063–34472, 1971). The sortable table below lists, in addition to the aforementioned Tawaststjerna traversal, other commercially available recordings of the complete Six Impromptus:

No.	Pianist	Runtimes (Note: All runtimes are official, as printed on CD or LP liner notes.)							Rec. (Note: Refers to the year in which the performers recorded the work; this may not be the same as the year in which the recording was first released to the general public.)	Recording venue	Label	Ref.
No.	Pianist	Op. 5/1	Op. 5/2	Op. 5/3	Op. 5/4	Op. 5/5	Op. 5/6	Total	Rec.	Recording venue	Label	Ref.
1	Erik T. Tawaststjerna	1:46	2:03	2:49	2:11	3:25	2:12	14:51	1979	Nacka Aula, Nacka	BIS	(Note: E. Tawaststjerna–BIS (CD–153) 1987)
2	Annette Servadei	1:50	1:58	2:08	2:34	3:31	2:56	14:59	1992	Christ's Hospital, Horsham	Olympia	(Note: A. Servadei–Olympia (OCD 631) 1997)
3	Risto Lauriala	1:40	1:44	3:08	2:42	3:49	1:45	14:48	1995	Järvenpää Hall	Naxos	(Note: R. Lauriala–Naxos (8.553661) 1996)
4	Izumi Tateno	1:49	1:44	2:51	2:14	3:59	2:10	14:47	1995	Ainola	Canyon Classics	(Note: I. Tateno–Canyon Classics (PCCL–00328) 1996)
5	Eero Heinonen (1)	2:50	1:57	3:01	2:27	3:24	3:11	16:50	1996	YLE M2 Studio, Helsinki	Finlandia	(Note: E. Heinonen–Finlandia (8573–80776–2) 2000)
6	Håvard Gimse	2:19	1:38	2:12	2:13	3:08	7:00	18:35	1997	St Martin's Church, East Woodhay	Naxos	(Note: H. Gimse–Naxos (8.553899) 1999)
7	Folke Gräsbeck	1:53	1:51	2:33	2:07	3:36	6:02	18:22	2003	Nybrokajen 11, Stockholm	BIS	(Note: F. Gräsbeck–BIS (CD–1909/11) 2008)
8	Cassandra Wyss	3:00	2:05	3:59	2:27	3:39	2:28	17:38	2014	Andreaskirche am Wannsee, Berlin	Cappriccio	(Note: C. Wyss–Capriccio (C5229) 2014)
9	Eero Heinonen (2)	2:29	1:50	2:29	2:17	3:17	2:49	15:11	2015	Sello Hall, Espoo	Piano Classics	(Note: E. Heinonen–Piano Classics (PCL10220) 2020)
10	Janne Mertanen	2:20	1:51	2:34	2:29	3:26	3:50	16:30	2015	[Unknown], Helsinki	Sony Classical	(Note: J. Mertanen–Sony Classics (888751614222) 2015)
11	Sophia Rahman	2:11	2:02	2:24	1:45	4:03	5:05	17:30	2017	Sidney Sussex College Chapel	Resonus Classics	(Note: S. Rahman–Resonus Classics (RES10205) 2018)
12	Maria Kihlgren	2:07	1:51	2:49	2:09	3:48	6:24	19:19	2019	Studio 2, Swedish Radio	Sterling	(Note: M. Kihlgren–Sterling (CDA 1842–2) 2020)
13	Terhi Dostal										Alba	(Note: T. Dostal–Label (ABCD 514) 2022)
14	Joseph Tong										Quartz	(Note: J. Tong–Quartz (QTZ 2158) 2023)

== Notes, references, and sources ==
Notes

Sources

- Barnett, Andrew (2007). Sibelius. New Haven: Yale University Press. ISBN 978-0-300-11159-0.
- Dahlström, Fabian [in Swedish] (2003). Jean Sibelius: Thematisch-bibliographisches Verzeichnis seiner Werke [Jean Sibelius: A Thematic Bibliographic Index of His Works] (in German). Wiesbaden: Breitkopf & Härtel. ISBN 3-7651-0333-0.
- Layton, Robert (1993) [1965]. Sibelius. (The Master Musicians Series) (4th ed.). New York: Schirmer Books. ISBN 0028713222.
