= Piano Sonata in F major (Sibelius) =

Sonata by Jean Sibelius (1893)

- by Jean Sibelius
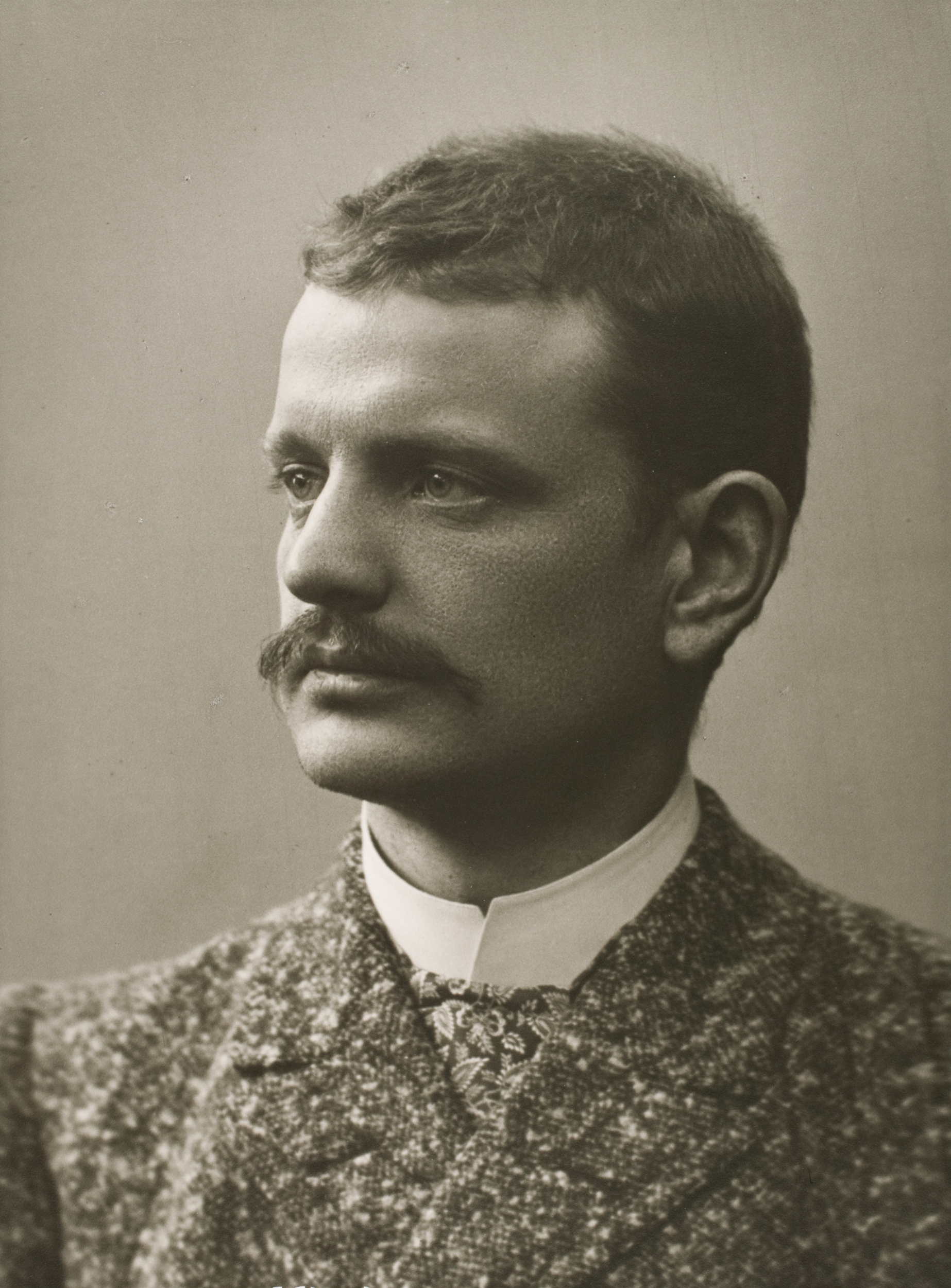
- The composer (c. 1891)
- Opus: 12
- Composed: 1893
- Publisher: Breitkopf & Härtel (1906)
- Duration: 17 mins
- Movements: 3

Premiere
- Date: 17 April 1895
- Location: Helsinki, Grand Duchy of Finland
- Performers: Oskar Merikanto (piano)

The Piano Sonata in F major, Op. 12, is a three-movement composition for piano written in 1893 by the Finnish composer Jean Sibelius. The piece received its premiere in Helsinki on 17 April 1895; Oskar Merikanto was the soloist.

Ilmari Hannikainen, a prominent Finnish composer, said "the F major Piano sonata... a splendid work. Fresh, refreshing and full of life. … I have sometimes heard people mention the orchestral tone of the sonata (the left-hand tremolos) … In my opinion the sonata shows Sibelian piano style at its most genuine. There is no question of there being any tremolos in it. Everything that looks like that is really to be played in quavers or semi-quavers, in the manner of, say, Beethoven's piano sonatas. … When it is well and carefully rehearsed - and performed - the F major sonata is truly a virtuoso piece".

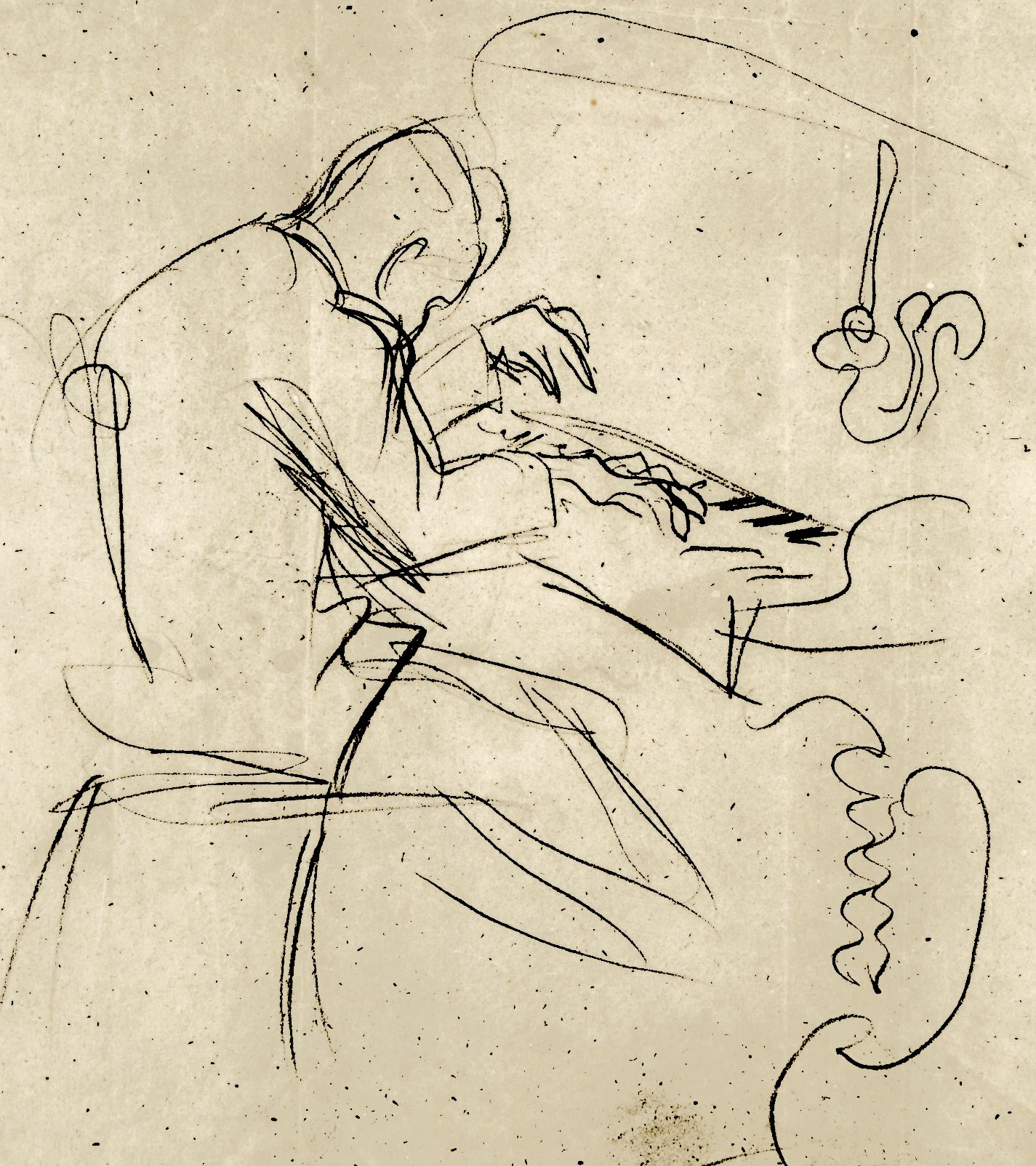
An 1892 sketch of Sibelius at the piano by his future brother-in-law Eero Järnefelt

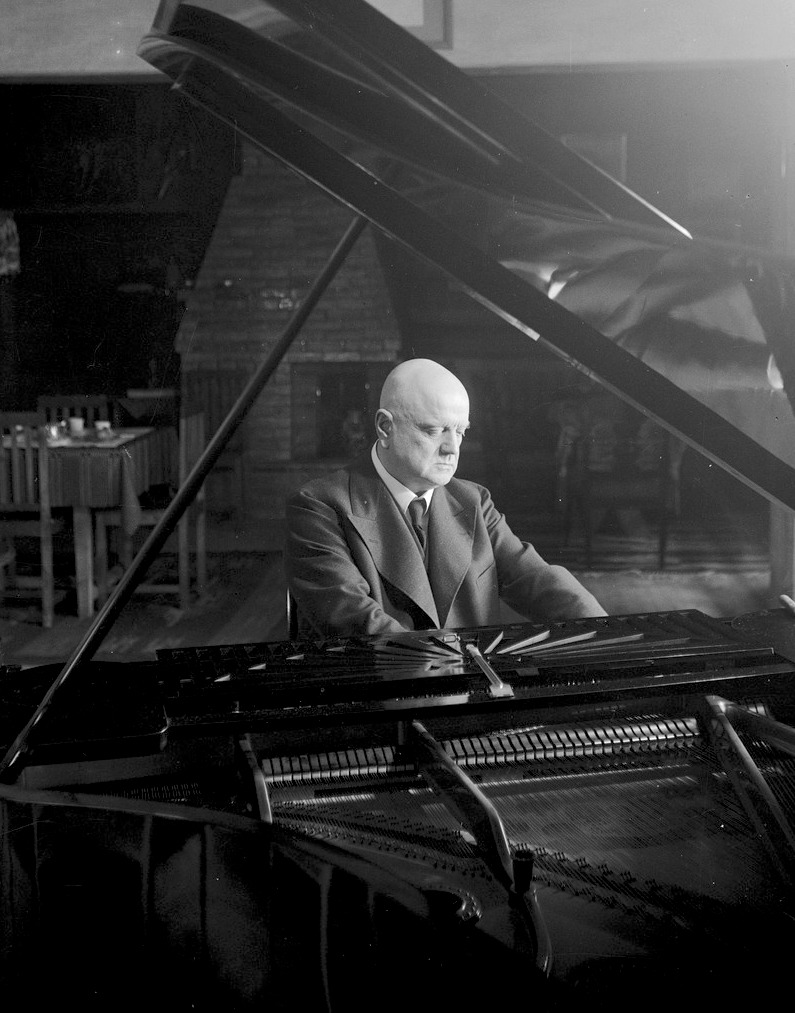
Sibelius (1927) plays the Steinway grand piano at his home, Ainola.

== Structure and music ==
The sonata has three movements:

1. Allegro molto
2. Andantino
3. Vivacissimo

== Reception ==
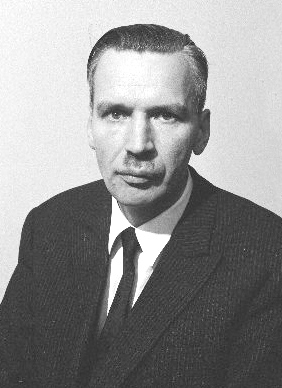
Erik Tawaststjerna, who authored seminal biography on Sibelius, was an early, vocal advocate for many of the composer's piano pieces.

Robert Layton displays a certain ambivalence towards the Piano Sonata. On the one hand, he dismisses the piano writing as "inept", characterized by "immaturity and uncertainty". On the other hand, he concedes not only that "there is [nevertheless] a good deal to admire in this sonata", but also that relative to the Six Impromptus (Op. 5) from earlier in the year, the Sonata shows that Sibelius had matured as an artist in the span of just a few months: "[It] stands head and shoulders above most of Sibelius's early piano music both in quality of invention and the growing mastery of form it evinces".

== Discography ==
The American pianist David Rubenstein made the world premiere studio recording of the Piano Sonata in 1971 for the Musical Heritage Society. The table below lists this and other commercially available recordings:

No.	Pianist	Time	Rec. (Note: Refers to the year in which the performers recorded the work; this may not be the same as the year in which the recording was first released to the general public.)	Recording venue	Label	Ref.
1	David Rubenstein	18:36	c. 1971		Musical Heritage Society	(Note: D. Rubenstein–Musical Heritage Society (MHS 1218) 1977)
2	Erik T. Tawaststjerna	17:56	1979	Nacka Aula, Nacka	BIS	(Note: E. Tawaststjerna–BIS (CD–153) 1987)
3	Annette Servadei	19:18	1993	St George's Church, Brandon Hill	Olympia	(Note: A. Servadei–Olympia (OCD 633) 1997)
4	Marita Viitasalo	19:23	1994	Järvenpää Hall	Finlandia	(Note: M. Viitasalo–Finlandia (4509–98984–2) 1995)
5	Håvard Gimse	17:48	1997	St Martin's Church, East Woodhay	Naxos	(Note: H. Gimse–Naxos (8.553899) 1999)
6	Eero Heinonen	17:49	1998	YLE M2 Studio, Helsinki	Finlandia	(Note: E. Heinonen–Finlandia (8573–80776–2) 2000)
7	Kikuo Watanabe		2003	Tokyo Bunka Kaikan	Exton	(Note: K. Watanabe–Exton (OVCX–00009) 2004)
7	Folke Gräsbeck	16:57	2005	Järvenpää Hall	BIS	(Note: F. Gräsbeck–BIS (CD–1909/11) 2008)
8	Jean-Frédéric Neuburger	16:56	2013	Husum Castle	Danacord	(Note: J. Neuburger–Danacord (DACOCD 739) 2014)
9	Janne Mertanen	16:08	2015	[Unknown], Helsinki	Sony Classical	(Note: J. Mertanen–Sony Classics (888751614222) 2015)
10	Joseph Tong	18:26	2016	Jacqueline Du Pré Music Building	Quartz	(Note: J. Tong–Quartz (QTZ 2123) 2017)
11	Fabiano Casanova		2019	Morsasco Castle, Morsasco	Da Vinci Classics	(Note: F. Casanova–Da Vinci Classics (DV–C00297) 2020)

== Notes, references, and sources ==
Notes

Sources

- Barnett, Andrew (2007). Sibelius. New Haven: Yale University Press. ISBN 978-0-300-11159-0.
- Dahlström, Fabian [in Swedish] (2003). Jean Sibelius: Thematisch-bibliographisches Verzeichnis seiner Werke [Jean Sibelius: A Thematic Bibliographic Index of His Works] (in German). Wiesbaden: Breitkopf & Härtel. ISBN 3-7651-0333-0.
- Layton, Robert (1993) [1965]. Sibelius. (The Master Musicians Series) (4th ed.). New York: Schirmer Books. ISBN 0028713222.
