= Op. 85 =

In music, Op. 85 stands for Opus number 85. Compositions that are assigned this number include:

- Beethoven – Christ on the Mount of Olives
- Britten – Owen Wingrave
- Elgar – Cello Concerto
- Hummel – Piano Concerto No. 2
- Mendelssohn – Songs without Words, Book VII
- Prokofiev – Zdravitsa
- Schumann – 12 Piano Pieces for Young and Older Children
- Sibelius – Five Pieces, Op. 85, The Flowers, for solo piano (1916–1917)
- Strauss – Capriccio
