= Henri Sigfridsson =

Finnish classical pianist

Henri Sigfridsson (born 1974) is a Finnish classical pianist.

== Studies ==
Born in Turku, Sigfridsson began his musical studies in his native hometown conservatory. He then attended Erik T. Tawaststjerna's class at the Sibelius Academy in Helsinki. In 1995, he changed to the class of Pavel Gililov at the Hochschule für Musik und Tanz Köln. From 1995 to 1997, he simultaneously studied in the master class of Lazar Berman in Weimar. In October 2011, he was appointed professor for piano at the Folkwang University of the Arts in Essen.

== Concerts ==
Sigfridsson has worked with many European symphony orchestras and has performed under such renowned conductors as Vladimir Ashkenazy, Lawrence Foster and Dennis Russell Davies. He plays chamber music with Gidon Kremer and Ivry Gitlis and trio with Sol Gabetta and Patricia Kopatchinskaja. Although he has no vocal training, he also performs with lieder, accompanying himself.

== Awards ==
Sigfridsson has successfully participated in many competitions. In July 2000 he won the 2nd prize and the audience award at the Concours Géza Anda in Zurich. In 1994, he won the 1st prize at the international Franz Liszt Competition in Weimar and in 1995 the major Scandinavian competition The Nordic Soloist Competition. In 2001, he received the Förderpreis des Landes Nordrhein-Westfalen für junge Künstlerinnen und Künstler. In 2005, he won the Beethoven Competition Bonn for Piano.
