= St George's Church, Brandon Hill =

Concert venue in Bristol, England

St George's Bristol
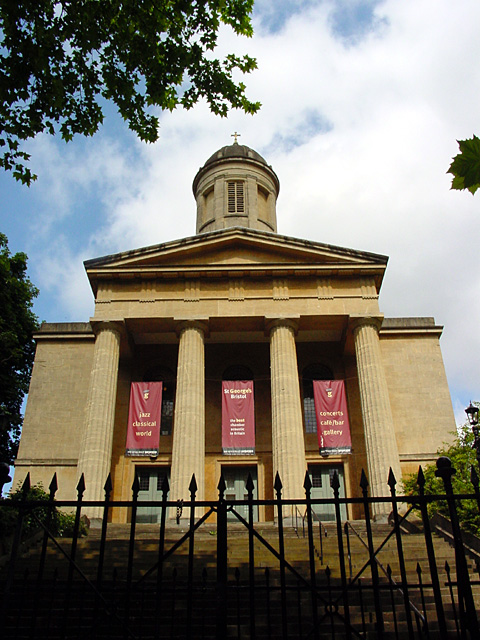

- Location within Bristol

General information
- Architectural style: Greek Revival
- Location: Bristol, England
- Coordinates: 51.4543°N 2.6038°W
- Construction started: 1821
- Completed: 1823

St George's is a former church in Great George Street, off Park Street, on the lower slopes of Brandon Hill in Bristol, England. Since 1999 it has been used as a music venue known as St George's Bristol. It was built in the 1820s by Sir Robert Smirke. It is a Grade II* listed building.

== History ==
St George's was built for use as a church in the Clifton area of Bristol, England, between 1821 and 1823 by the architect Sir Robert Smirke, who designed it in the Greek Revival style. It was a "Waterloo church", the only one in Bristol to receive government money from the first grant under the Church Building Act 1818.

It has been designated as a grade II* listed building.

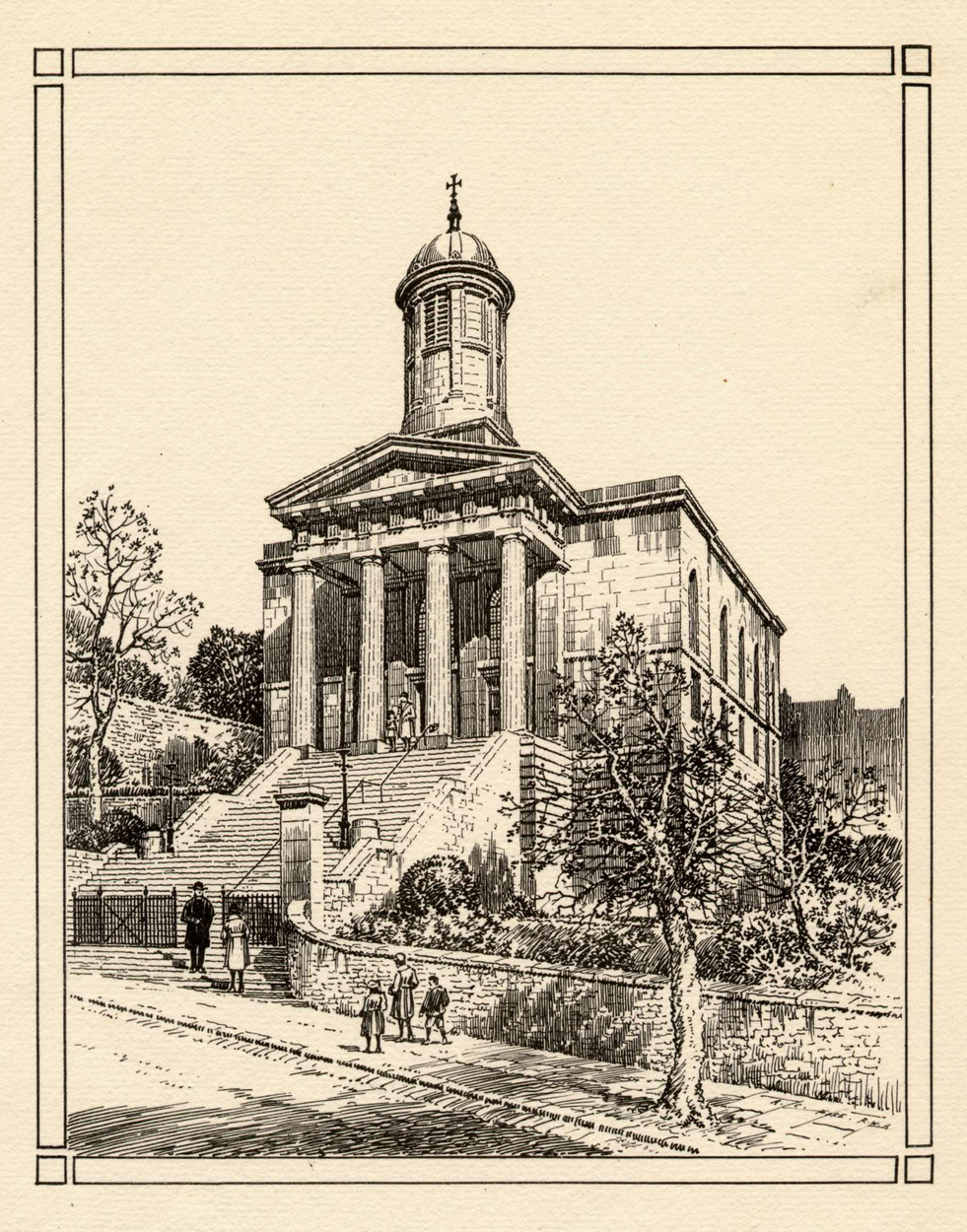
Plate etching of St George's Church, Brandon Hill, Bristol, UK, published before 1958. Viewed from the south, the image shows the church as it looked before the modern landscaping of its grounds. In the foreground is a street scene with five people ascending the steps to the church.

In 1999, the church underwent extensive renovations to make it suitable for use as a full-time concert venue and it re-opened that October under the name by which it is now known, St George's Bristol.

== Archives ==
Parish records for St George's church, Brandon Hill, Bristol are held at Bristol Archives (Ref. P.St GB) (online catalogue) including baptism and marriage registers and one burial register. The archive also includes records of the incumbent, churchwardens, parochial church council and charities, plus plans and photographs.

== Concert venue ==
In 1976 St George's Music Trust was formed and in succeeding years they established the church as a major concert venue, initially known as St George's, Brandon Hill. The main body of the church seats 562 people and the crypt has been transformed into a bar and recording studios which are regularly used by the BBC.

The 1999 renovations were extensive. They included replacing the auditorium pews with padded chairs, making the pews in the gallery more comfortable for concert seating, creating a box office and removing the font which was donated to the Church of St Mary on the Quay.

St George's Bristol is particularly known for presenting classical, jazz, folk, world music and opera and stages more than 200 events every year, regularly attracting artists of international note including Angela Hewitt, Nicola Benedetti, Julian Lloyd Webber, Mark Padmore, plus The Orchestra of the Age of Enlightenment (in Spring/Summer of 2010) and Viktoria Mullova, Stephen Hough, Paul Lewis, Christian Blackshaw, Janis Ian, Abdullah Ibrahim and Marc Almond (in Autumn 2011). In addition, regular performances are given by local professional groups such as the Bristol Ensemble and amateur orchestras and choirs.

== See also ==
- Churches in Bristol
- Grade II* listed buildings in Bristol
