= Izumi Tateno =

Japanese pianist (born 1936)

Izumi Tateno (舘野 泉, Tateno Izumi, (born 10 November 1936 in Tokyo) is a Japanese pianist.

Tateno studied at the Tōkyō Geijutsu Daigaku and is today a professor at the Sibelius Academy in Helsinki.

After a stroke during a concert on 9 January 2002, he had to take a break for some time. Even after medical rehabilitation, he still had paralysis of the right side of his body; since his comeback in May 2004, he has therefore played exclusively with his left hand. Numerous composers dedicated pieces to him specially tailored to his requirements. Tateno has won many prizes and awards. Since 17 September 1990, he has been chairman of the Japanese Sibelius Society (日本シベリウス協会, Nihon Shiberiusu Kyōkai), of which he is a founding member.

Tateno is currently active mainly in Finland, where he moved in 1964. In Japan, he has become widely known through the theme tune he performed for the television drama Taira no Kiyomori, composed by Takashi Yoshimatsu.
