= Ainola =

Home of Aino and Jean Sibelius in Järvenpää, Finland

Coordinates: 60°27′13″N 25°05′14″E

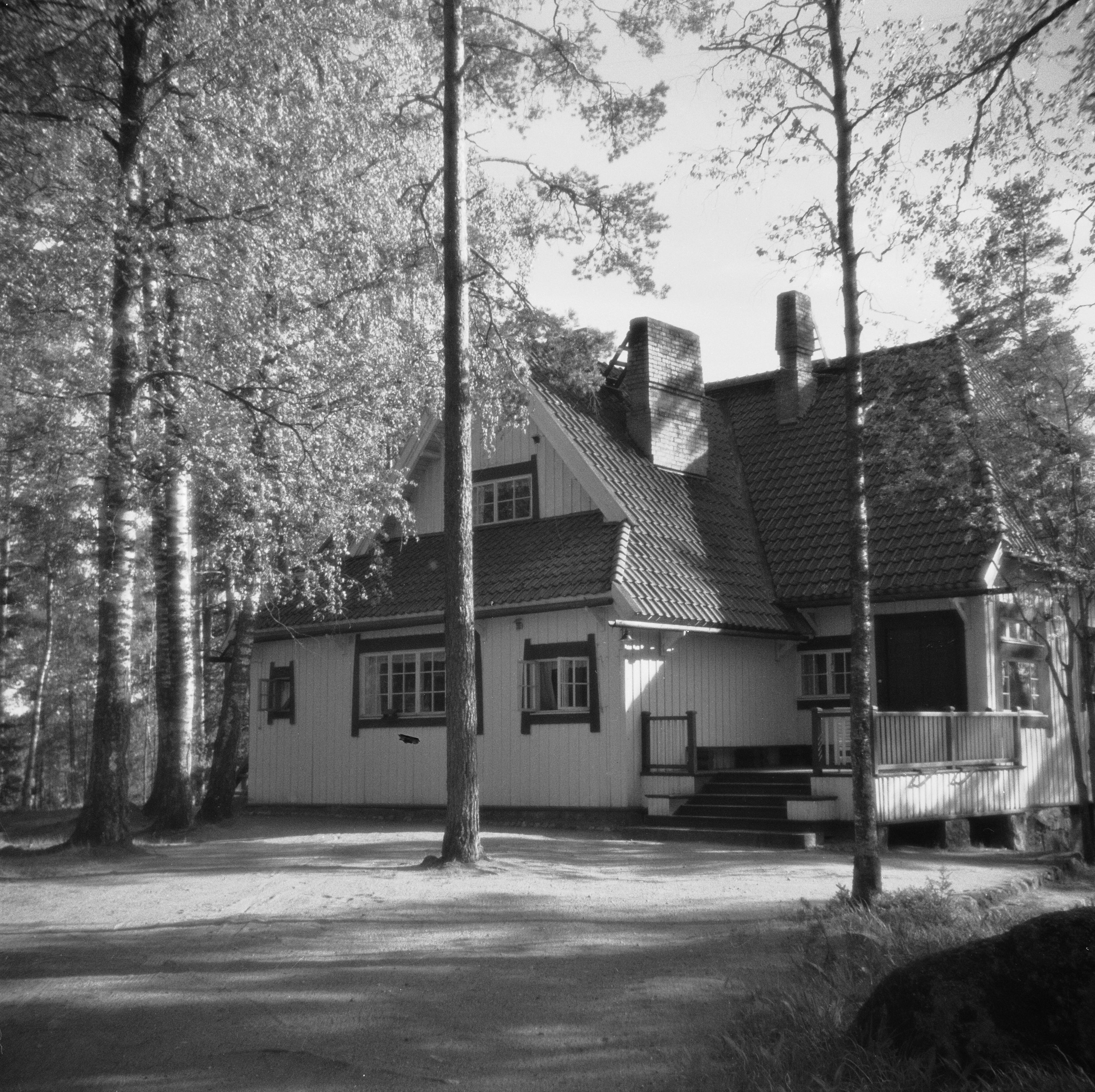
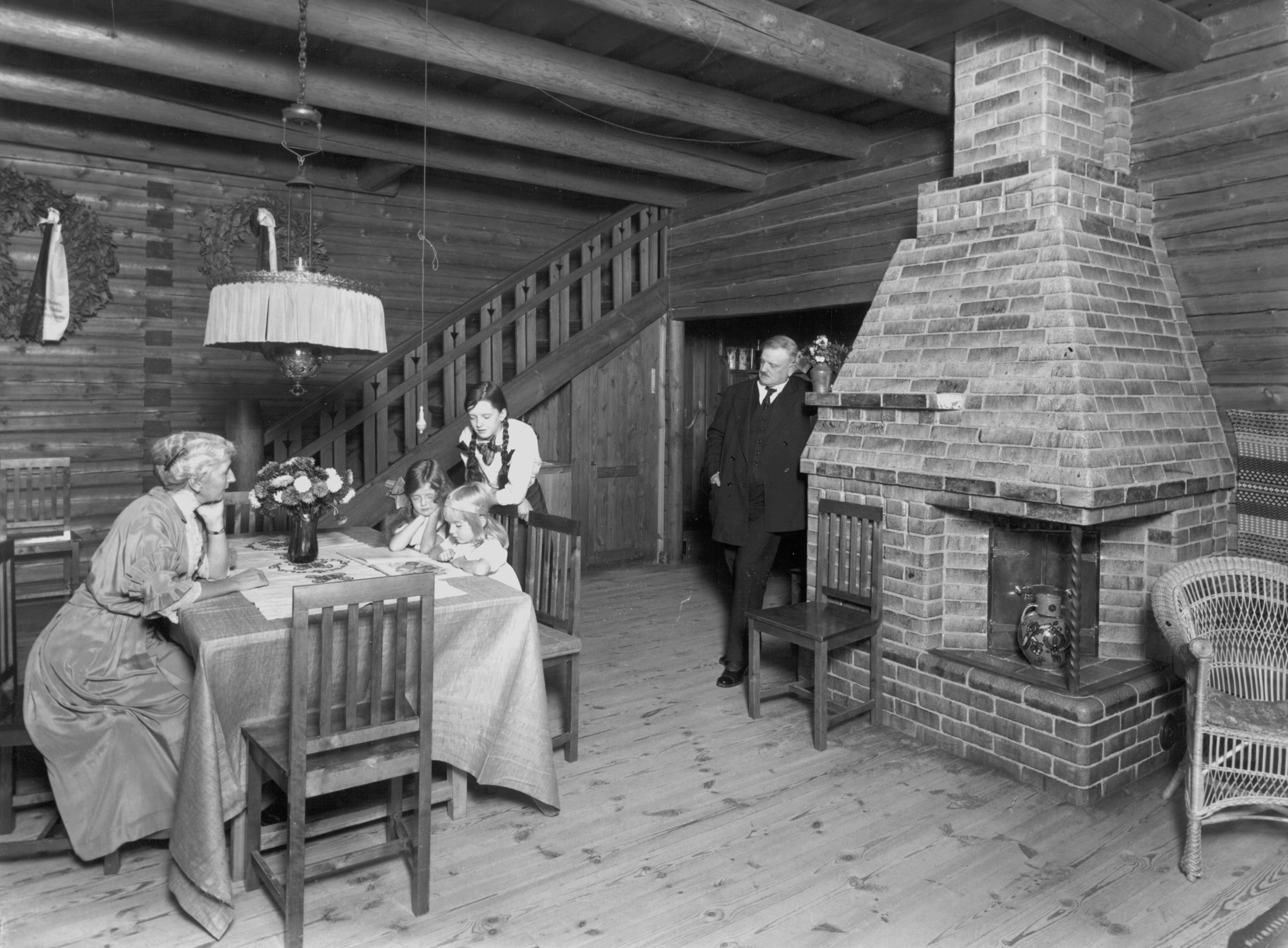
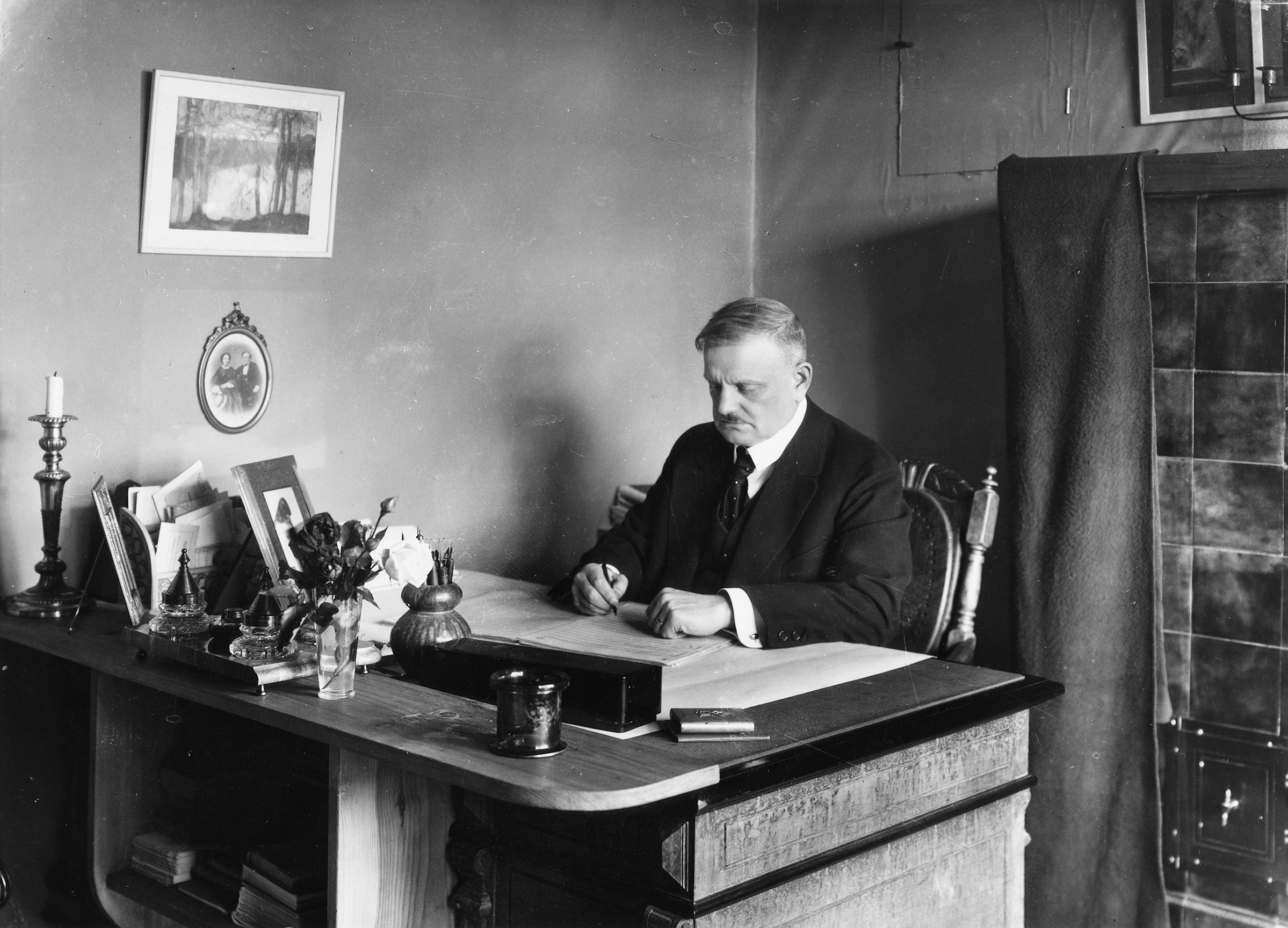
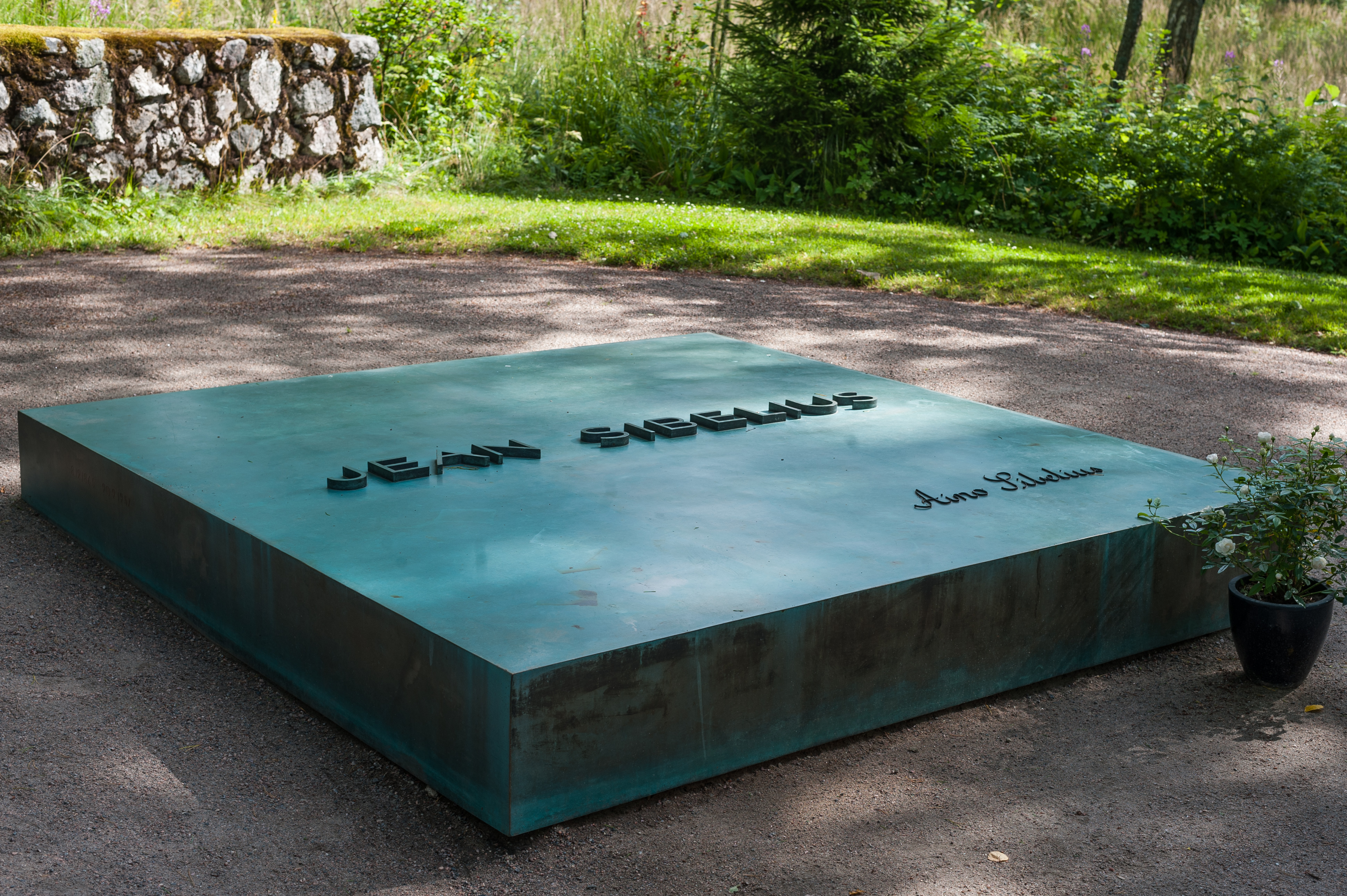
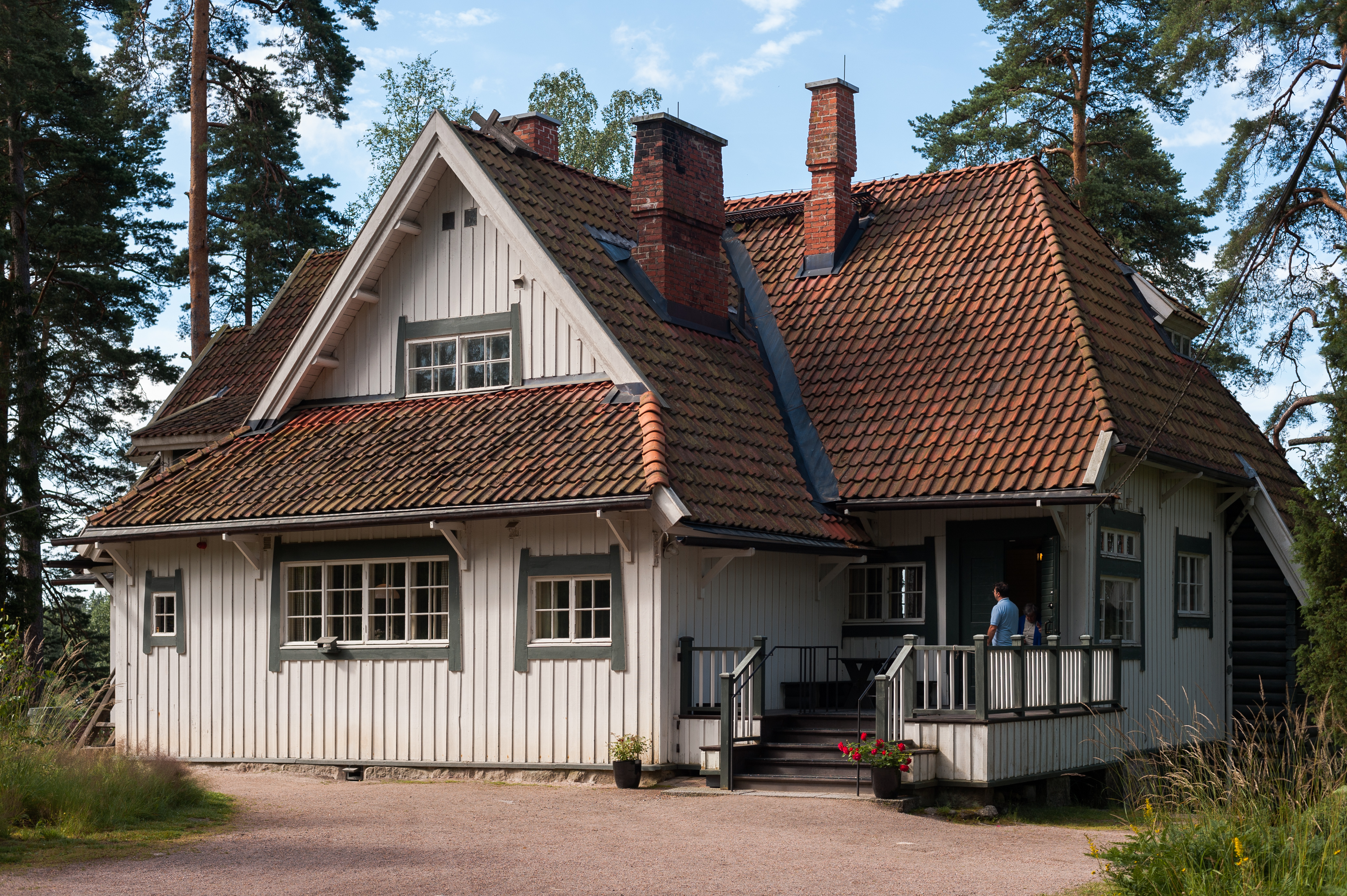
Clockwise from top: front of Ainola (1940s); Sibelius in his study (1915); Ainola in 2017, been a museum since 1974; Jean and Aino are buried in the garden; the family in the dining room (1915)

Ainola (literal English translation: "Aino's Place") is a museum in Järvenpää, Finland, which was the home of Finnish composer Jean Sibelius, his wife Aino (née Järnefelt), and their six daughters. Situated near Lake Tuusula, 38 kilometres (24 miles) north of Helsinki, the two-story wooden home was designed by Finnish architect Lars Sonck. The foundation was laid in the autumn of 1903, and the Sibelius family began occupying the residence in September 1904. The second floor of Ainola was finished in 1911.

The museum is maintained by Ainola Foundation, which was founded in 1972 by the Ministry of Education and Sibelius Society of Finland.

== Overview ==
The only requests Sibelius had for Sonck in designing Ainola were to include both a lake view and a green fireplace in the dining room. Running water was not installed until after Sibelius's death due to his wishes.

Ainola's distance from the hustle and bustle of the nation's capital gave the composer the peace that he needed for his creative endeavours. His biographer Erik W. Tawaststjerna writes that "when Sibelius first left Helsinki, Järvenpää was to a large extent untouched countryside. Foals and sheep almost nosed their way into the house, and from time to time an elk majestically bestrode the grounds." There were also other artistic families living in the neighborhood who provided a lively social circle for the Sibelius family.

Daily life in Ainola was documented by Sibelius's private secretary Santeri Levas in the 1945 photographic book Jean Sibelius and His Home.

Buildings around Ainola include a sauna building and a shed. Sibelius died in Ainola on September 20, 1957. His wife Aino lived in Ainola for the next twelve years until she died on June 8, 1969. They were both buried in Ainola's garden surrounded by apple trees.

== Museum ==
In 1972, Jean Sibelius's daughters Eva Paloheimo, Ruth Snellman, Katarina Ilves, Margareta Jalas, and Heidi Blomstedt sold Ainola to the Finnish government. The Ministry of Education and the Sibelius Society of Finland opened it as a museum in June 1974. It is currently open during the summer season, from May to September.

== See also ==
- List of music museums

== Bibliography ==
- Levas, Santeri (1955). Jean Sibelius ja hänen Ainolansa [Jean Sibelius and his home] (in Finnish). Helsinki: Kustannusosakeyhtiö Otava.
- Sadie, Julie Anne (2005). Calling on the Composer: A Guide to European Composer Houses and Museums. New Haven: Yale University Press. ISBN 978-0300107500.
- Tawaststjerna, Erik (1976). Sibelius. Berkeley: University of California Press. ISBN 978-0520058699.
- Vernon, David (2024). Sun Forest Lake: The Symphonies & Tone Poems of Jean Sibelius. Edinburgh: Candle Row Press. ISBN 978-1739659943.
