= Piano solo =

Musical works containing piano as the sole instrument

The piano is often used to provide harmonic accompaniment to a voice or instrument. But solo parts for the piano are common in many musical styles. These can take the form of a section in which the piano is heard more prominently than other instruments, or in which the piano may be played entirely unaccompanied.

The term piano solo is also often used to mean a musical composition written solely for piano.
