= Erik W. Tawaststjerna =

Finnish musicologist, pianist, pedagogue, and music critic (1916–1993)

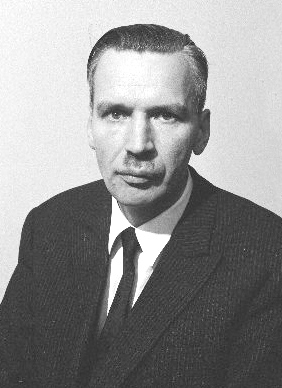
Tawaststjerna in 1962

Erik Werner Tawaststjerna (10 October 1916 – 22 January 1993) was a Finnish musicologist who also worked as a pianist, pedagogue, and critic. He is remembered as a significant biographer of Jean Sibelius for his multi-volume magnum opus on the composer.

== Biography ==
Erik Werner Tawaststjerna was born in Mikkeli, Grand Duchy of Finland in 1916. His piano studies were with Ilmari Hannikainen, K. Bernhard, Heinrich Leygraf, Heinrich Neuhaus, Alfred Cortot and Jules Gentil. His concert career began in 1943, and was confined to Scandinavia, Vienna and the Soviet Union, after which he became a private teacher. He held posts in the Press and Cultural Affairs Department of the Foreign Ministry of Finland from 1948 to 1960. His doctoral dissertation from the University of Helsinki in 1960 was on the piano works of Jean Sibelius, a subject that would form the basis for his eventual magnum opus; he became Professor of Musicology there from 1960 to 1983.

His magnum opus was his biography of Sibelius, who had been a personal friend of his. It used a wealth of hitherto unavailable personal material including private letters and diaries, to which he was given unrestricted access by Sibelius's family. Originally written in Swedish, it was first published in five volumes in Finnish; then five in Swedish; three in English (translated by Robert Layton); and one abridged volume in Russian. It was awarded the Tieto-Finlandia Award. The immediate impetus for the work was the 1959 biography of Sibelius by Harold E. Johnson, which created an uproar in Finland, and caused Sibelius's family to commission Tawaststjerna to write a more balanced account of the life of the composer.

Drawing on his background as a pianist and pedagogue, Tawaststjerna also served on the juries of international piano competitions (International Tchaikovsky Competition 1970, 1974; Rio de Janeiro Competition 1973; Ravel Competition 1975), and was music critic for the leading Finnish daily newspaper. In addition to his focus on Sibelius, Tawaststjerna also wrote on Sergei Prokofiev, but was unable to complete a major biography of Dmitri Shostakovich before his death. He died in Helsinki in 1993, aged 76.

His son Erik T. Tawaststjerna is also a pianist and pedagogue, who teaches at the Sibelius Academy in Helsinki.
