= Erik Thomas Tawaststjerna =

Finnish pianist

Erik Thomas Tawaststjerna (born 8 June 1951 in Helsinki, Finland) is a Finnish pianist and pedagogue who teaches at the Sibelius Academy.

== Biography ==
His father was Erik W. Tawaststjerna. After taking private piano lessons in his youth with Genrietta Mirvis in Moscow, Tawaststjerna enrolled at the University of Music and Performing Arts Vienna and Juilliard School of Music, where he studied with Dieter Weber and Sascha Gorodnitzki, respectively. Subsequently, Tawaststjerna studied with Eugene List at New York University, where he obtained his doctorate. Later he took part in masterclasses with Wilhelm Kempff and Dmitri Bashkirov. Tawaststjerna returned to Finland to teach at the Sibelius Academy, where he has served on the faculty since 1982. In 2006, Tawaststjerna was named "Professor of the Year" by Professoriliitto, the Finnish Union of University Professors. His students (including Janne Mertanen, Henri Sigfridsson, Victor Chestopal, Julia Mustonen, Risto-Matti Marin and Terhi Dostal) have been successful in numerous Finnish and international competitions.

== Performing career ==
Tawaststjerna performed as soloist in the Finnish premiere of Leonard Bernstein's Symphony No. 2 "The Age of Anxiety" in 1981. In 1990, he was invited to Tokyo to perform for the Emperor and Empress of Japan. He has recorded the complete original piano music of Sibelius.
