= Janne Mertanen =

Finnish pianist (born 1967)

- Born: 28 August 1967 (age 58); Joensuu, Finland
- Instrument: Piano
- Years active: 1986–present
- Website: www.jannemertanen.com

Janne Juhani Mertanen (born 28 August 1967 in Joensuu, Finland) is a Finnish classical pianist. He has studied at the Joensuu Conservatory under Matti Haapasalo and at the Sibelius Academy as a student of, among others, Erik T. Tawaststjerna. The pianist, who specializes in Chopin, made his debut at London's Wigmore Hall with a Chopin program in 1994.

== Life and career ==
Janne Mertanen has studied at the Joensuu Conservatory as a student of Matti Haapasalo and at the Sibelius Academy, where his teachers included Erik Thomas Tawaststjerna and Dmitri Bashkirov. He then completed his studies with Lazar Berman at the Accademia Pianistica in Imola, Italy. He made his debut at Wigmore Hall in London in 1994, with a Chopin program. In March 2010, he made his South American debut as the soloist of Schumann's piano concerto with the Orchestra of the National Theater of Brazil. In 2014, he made his solo debut in Japan with the Tokyo New City Orchestra. Janne Mertanen is best known for his performances and recordings of Frederic Chopin. Mertanen is also an Artistic Director of the music festival Joensuun Musiikkijuhlat, which has presented various well known artists, such as Klaus Mäkelä, Seela Sella and Iiro Rantala.

== Early life ==
When Mertanen was a child, he initially wanted to become a tennis player. However, at the age of 12, he started to play piano and decided to make it his career.

== Discography ==
Most of Mertanen's recordings are published either by Sony Classical or Finnish label Alba Records.

- Chopin: Mertanen-Chopin. Sony Classical, 2023
- Sibelius: Finnish Folk Songs & Discoveries. Sony Classical, 2021
- Kaski: Yö meren rannalla, Heino Kaski Piano Works. Alba, 2018
- Palmgren: Piano Concertos 4-5, Pori Sinfonietta-Jan Söderblom. Alba, 2017
- Sibelius: Piano Works, 5 CDs. Sony Classical, 2015
- Grieg/Schumann: Piano Concertos, Gävle Symphony Orchestra-Hannu Koivula. Alba, 2013
- Chopin: Grand Chopin, Works for piano & Orchestra. Turku Philharmonic-Jani Telaranta. Alba, 2011
- Nino Rota: Piano Concertos e & C / Tampere Philharmonic-Hannu Lintu. Alba, 2010
- Sibelius: Piano Works. Presence Records, 2010
- Chopin: Piano Concertos 1 & 2 / Joensuu City Orchestra-Hannu Koivula. Alba, 2008
- Chopin: Nocturnes vol.2 Alba 2003 ("Grand Prix du Disque Frederic Chopin" - award, Warsaw, 2005)
- Chopin: Nocturnes vol.1 Alba 2001 ("Grand Prix du Disque Frederic Chopin" - award, Warsaw, 2005)
- Romantic Finnish Piano (Madetoja, Sibelius, etc). Macedonia Records, 2001
- Chopin: 10 Mazurkas, 3 Etudes, etc. Alba, 2000
- Kokkonen: Piano Works. Alba, 1998
- Satie: Satierik - Piano Works. Alba, 1997
- Chopin Recital. Finlandia Records, 1994

== Competitions ==
- International Chopin Competition Darmstadt, 1992, 1st place
- Nyborg Nordic Piano Competition (Denmark), 1992, 1st place
