= Sibelius Monument =

Sculpture and memorial in Helsinki, Finland

Coordinates: 60°10′55″N 24°54′48″E

- Passio Musicae
- Location: Sibelius Park, Töölö, Helsinki
- Designer: Eila Hiltunen
- Type: Public art memorial
- Material: Stainless steel: welded (pipe cluster); cast (high-relief portrait)
- Beginning date: 1961
- Completion date: 1967
- Dedicated date: 7 September 1967
- Dedicated to: Jean Sibelius

The Sibelius Monument (Finnish: Sibelius-monumentti; Swedish: Sibeliusmonumentet) is a public art memorial to the Finnish composer Jean Sibelius, who died in 1957. Situated in Sibelius Park within the Töölö district of Helsinki, the monument is by the Finnish sculptor Eila Hiltunen, whose design—Passio Musicae (originally Credo)—won a contentious, and therefore protracted, competition that the Sibelius Society of Finland held from 1961 to 1962. After five additional years of work by Hiltunen and her assistants, the completed monument received its unveiling at a ceremony on 7 September 1967, when the Sibelius Society donated it to the City of Helsinki. As with other items in the city's art collection, it is managed and curated by the Helsinki Art Museum.

The monument comprises two distinct elements, each installed on granite natural to the terrain. The first, original to Hiltunen's proposal, is an abstract cluster of 569 (Note: Sources regularly put the Sibelius Monument's number of pipes at about 600. However, a 2015 digital art installation for the Ateneum Art Museum, by the German audio sculptor Lukas Kühne and the Finnish media artist Matti Niinimäki (assisted by art and design students from the Aalto University Media Lab), placed the exact number of pipes at 569. For more on their audio project, see the Derivative works section below.) acid-resistant stainless steel pipes, decoratively textured and welded together in an undulating pattern; visitors can stand within the resulting cavity. Hiltunen intended the cluster, which measures 8.5 by 10.5 by 6.5 metres (28 ft × 34 ft × 21 ft) and weighs 24 tonnes (24 long tons; 26 short tons), to symbolically evoke Sibelius's music. Nevertheless, observers have tended to find it representational of an organ or of the Finnish landscape, such as its birch woodlands and shore reeds. Although Hiltunen did not design Passio Musicae to be a sound sculpture, the pipe cluster can generate sounds due to wind, rain, and echoing voices and birdsong. The monument's second element, which the society required Hiltunen to add as a figurative concession to critics of her abstract approach, is a high-relief portrait of Sibelius in his mid-forties, cast of acid-resistant stainless steel and framed by three free-form shards. Because the two elements were pickled and passivated, the monument has neither patinated nor corroded over time.

Despite the polarized figurative–abstract discourse that accompanied Passio Musicae's commissioning, the Sibelius Monument has become one of the most recognized sights of the Helsinki cityscape and ranks among Finland's most visited tourist attractions. It is Hiltunen's most famous work and is credited with helping to modernize Finland's then-conservative, male-dominated art scene. In addition, the Finnish state has utilized the Sibelius Monument as a tool of cultural diplomacy, for example by donating Hiltunen's studies to UNESCO in 1967 and the United Nations Headquarters in 1983.

== History ==
=== Background ===
In the 1930s, the City of Helsinki developed a green space on the shores of Humallahti as Humala Park, (Note: Finnish: Humallahdenpuisto; Swedish: Hummelviksparken) which it renamed as Sibelius Park (Note: Finnish: Sibeliuksenpuisto; Swedish: Sibeliusparken) in November 1945, in honor of the composer Jean Sibelius, who turned eighty on 8 December. Plans were made the next year to add a statue or bust of the composer to the park, but the initiative remained dormant until Sibelius died on 20 September 1957. Ten days later, Finland honored the composer with a state funeral at Helsinki Cathedral, followed by a funeral procession to Ainola, his home in Järvenpää. The Sibelius Society of Finland was founded on 7 December of the same year, its mission being the curation of the composer's legacy and promotion of his oeuvre.

=== Sculpture competition ===
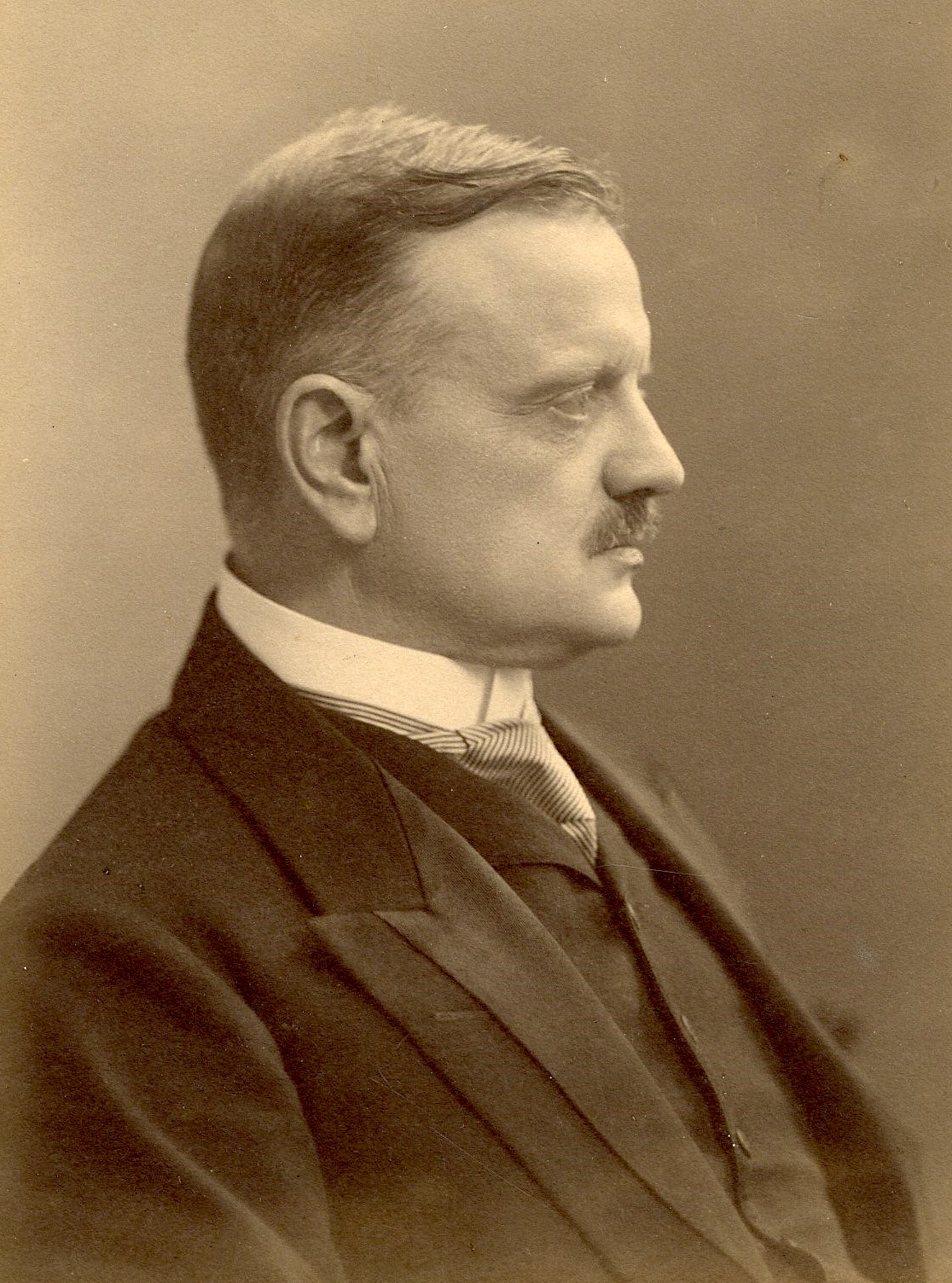
The composer Jean Sibelius (c. 1911), in his mid-forties

In late December 1959, the Sibelius Society invited Finnish sculptors to participate in a competition. The rules stipulated that entries should convey both the personality and music of the composer, which allowed for figurative and abstract solutions. First prize paid 750,000 Finnish markka, second 500,000, and third 300,000; the jury could also recommend redeeming up to two works, for 150,000 markka each. The society's board, however, would make the final decision on the commissioning contract. (Note: Sculptors were to submit the following: a 1:5 scale sketch of the entire monument, a 1:1 scale detail, a site plan, a list of materials, and a cost estimate. Each entry was anonymized under a pseudonym, with the name of its artist enclosed in a sealed envelope; only the envelopes of prize-winning and redeemed submissions were to be opened.)

==== First round: Hiltunen places sixth; Credo purchased ====
Credo (1961), Hiltunen's first round entry, has four legs, smooth pipes, and a static form. It took sixth place and was purchased.

Eila Hiltunen had pioneered sculptural welding in Finland in the late 1950s, and by the time of the Sibelius monument competition, she had obtained notable public art commissions with Veden alla ('Underwater'; 1960, Tampere) and Kuparikonstruktio ('Copper Construction'; 1961, Helsinki). (Note: Hiltunen transitioned to sculptural welding in January 1957, after studying the technique privately under skilled craftsmen, including a class in 1958 with the American sculptor Alexander Calder. Her early welded works were figurative, albeit rugged, and her embrace of abstract art came in 1960 with the fountain 'Copper Construction'—Helsinki's first abstract public art piece, unveiled in August 1961.) She entered the competition with Credo (1961), an abstract work that depicted Sibelius's music as a welded cluster of untextured pipes, four of which extended downward as supports; inside the resulting cavity was a tangle of criss-crossing rods and spheres, which was to double as an altar for wreaths. The lack of a pedestal would also allow the public to stand within the completed structure. Hiltunen cited various inspirations, ranging from a childhood dream and Böcklin's painting Isle of the Dead to pagodas and medieval churches.

The Sibelius Society, the Association of Finnish Sculptors, and the Finnish Association of Architects assembled the jury, which consisted of 10 members, of which one—Knud Nellemose of Denmark—was an international representative. (Note: In addition to Knud Nellemose, the first round jury members were: the second president of the Sibelius Society Severi Saarinen; the historian, chairman of the board of the Finnish Cultural Foundation, and first president of the Sibelius Society Lauri Puntila; the art historian Lars Pettersson; the composer and the Sibelius Academy rector Taneli Kuusisto; the architects Aulis Blomstedt and Väinö Tuukkanen (the former having been Sibelius's son-in-law); the sculptors Aimo Tukiainen and Lauri Leppänen; and the rector of the Helsinki Cooperative College Veikko Lahdenpää.) The society received 50 proposals by the deadline on 25 May 1961. On 9 June, the jury announced its decision, awarding Toivo Jaatinen first prize for his figurative–abstract hybrid, Säveltäjämestari ('Master Composer'). (Note: Toivo Jaatinen's prizewinning first round proposal, Säveltäjämestari ('Master Composer') depicted a seated Sibelius in his later years (with his iconic domed head); this figurative element was complemented by an abstract one, as the composer looks at one of his compositions being born before him. The full sculpture was never realized, as the Sibelius Society mandated a second round that Hiltunen's Passio Musicae subsequently won. However, in 2021, Jaatinen's estate donated a plaster 1 metre (3 ft 3 in)-high detail sketch of Sibelius's head to Sibelius Hall in Lahti. In addition, two bronzes of the head exist: one is on display at the Kuopio Music Center, while the other is in Kuopio's Russian sister city, Pskov.) Harry Kivijärvi took second prize and Martti Peitso third. In addition, the jury recommended that the society redeem three (not two) proposals—those by Kauko Räsänen, Ben Renvall, and as a supernumerary acquisition Hiltunen's sixth-place Credo, which the press had nicknamed "organ pipes". Of the six, only Jaatinen and Renvall had sculpted the composer; like Hiltunen, Räsänen had submitted an abstract solution, while Kivijärvi and Peitso had both based their designs on a group of figures. The society's board was dissatisfied with all entries but believed the six aforementioned submissions merited an opportunity for refinement. In lieu of a commissioning contract, it mandated an unplanned second round, to which it invited the six sculptors.

==== Second round: Hiltunen's Passio Musicae takes first ====
Passio Musicae (1961–62), Hiltunen's second round entry, has three legs, textured pipes, and an undulating form. It took first place but underwent subsequent revision.

For the second round, the finalists could either refine their initial proposals or compose something new; however, the society clarified its preference that designs include a figurative depiction of Sibelius. Hiltunen chose to evolve Credo into Passio Musicae ('Passion for Music'; 1961–62). (Note: In 2004, the Finnish National Gallery purchased maquettes of both Credo and Passio Musicae.) Relative to its predecessor, the pipe cluster of Passio Musicae stands on one leg fewer and undulates, conveying movement; moreover, its pipes are decoratively textured and, to manipulate light and shadow, cut with fissures. Hiltunen credited the late-medieval Milan Cathedral—which she encountered while in the Italian city to plan her 1962 solo exhibition there—with helping her to refine her proposal, transforming the "cupboard"-esque Credo into something "Gothic". She also replaced the tangle of rods and spheres with a plaque that included Sibelius's profile in silver inlay. Kivijärvi and Peitso also opted to develop their initial entries, while Jaatinen, Räsänen, and Renvall submitted new designs.

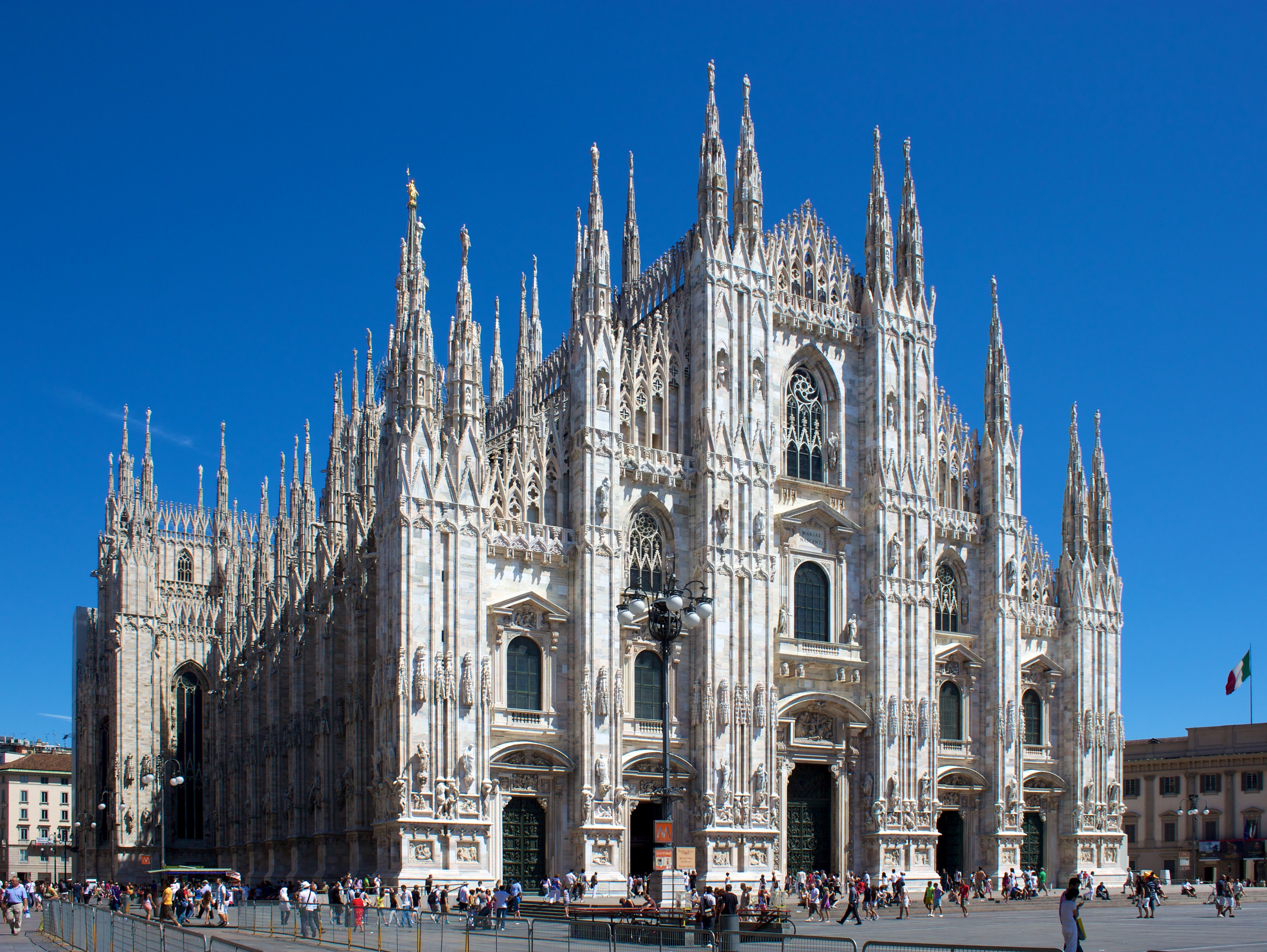
The late-medieval Milan Cathedral, which Hiltunen said helped inspire the evolution of Credo into Passio Musicae

For the second round, the jury was differently constituted, comprising 13 members. The number of international representatives was increased to three, with Nellemose joined by the sculptors Luciano Minguzzi of Italy and Oskar Hansen of Poland. (Note: Among domestic jury members, Saarinen, Puntila, Kuusisto, Blomstedt, Tuukkanen, and Lahdenpää returned for the second round, while the art historian Sakari Saarikivi, the vuorineuvos Gunnar Hernberg, and the sculptors Oskari Jauhiainen and Heikki Varja joined as new members.) At the announcement ceremony on 17 September 1962, the jury unanimously awarded Hiltunen first place, with Peitso second and Renvall third. However, it divided on the question of whether the Sibelius Society should commission Passio Musicae without first having Hiltunen modify her proposal to include a more prominent figurative depiction of the composer. The seven art jury members from fields related to the arts (Note: The seven jury members supporting Hiltunen were: the sculptors Hansen, Jauhiainen, Minguzzi, Nellemose, and Varja, as well as the architect Blomstedt and the art historian Saarikivi.) favored commissioning Passio Musicae as is; they jointly cited Passio Musicae as the competition's most original and high-quality entry and stated their belief that it had the potential to become a compelling monument. (Note: Finnish: "Omaperäisin ehdotus ... Ehdotus vastaa parhaiten kilpailun tarkoitusta. Se on kokonaisuutena korkealuokkainen ... teoksella on mahdollisuus päästä hyvään monumentaaliseen vaikutukseen".) In an interview with the Finnish-language newspaper Helsingin Sanomat, Hiltunen addressed the "organ pipes" moniker, asserting that she had never thought of an organ or any other musical instrument when designing her proposal; rather, she had sought to express abstractly the idea of music itself.

Several notable individuals spoke to the press in support of Hiltunen. Nellemose commented that the abstract design was in the spirit of the era and should not be combined with a figurative element, while Minguzzi thought that, upon the realization of Passio Musicae, Finland would achieve worldwide fame. Sibelius's five daughters expressed their joint belief that Hiltunen's work was "perfectly suited to reflect our father and his music". (Note: Finnish: "Tämä teos sopii erinomaisesti kuvastamaan isäämme ja hänen musiikkiaan".) They reasoned that because Sibelius had never liked his own works to be explained, he probably too would not have wanted his own figure in the monument—rather, he would have trusted an artist's abstract vision. The Sibelius scholar and pianist Erik Tawaststjerna thought Hiltunen had captured the forward-looking, absolute nature of the composer's music and hoped she would be commissioned. The Sibelius Society's board, however, disagreed, deciding that Passio Musicae was not a satisfactory solution, because it did not sufficiently depict the composer himself and the estimated 1,000 metres (3,300 ft) of stainless steel piping would cost double the available budget of 1 million markka. Rather than commission Hiltunen, the board appointed a committee to study the matter further.

==== Public debate, figurative concession, and commission ====
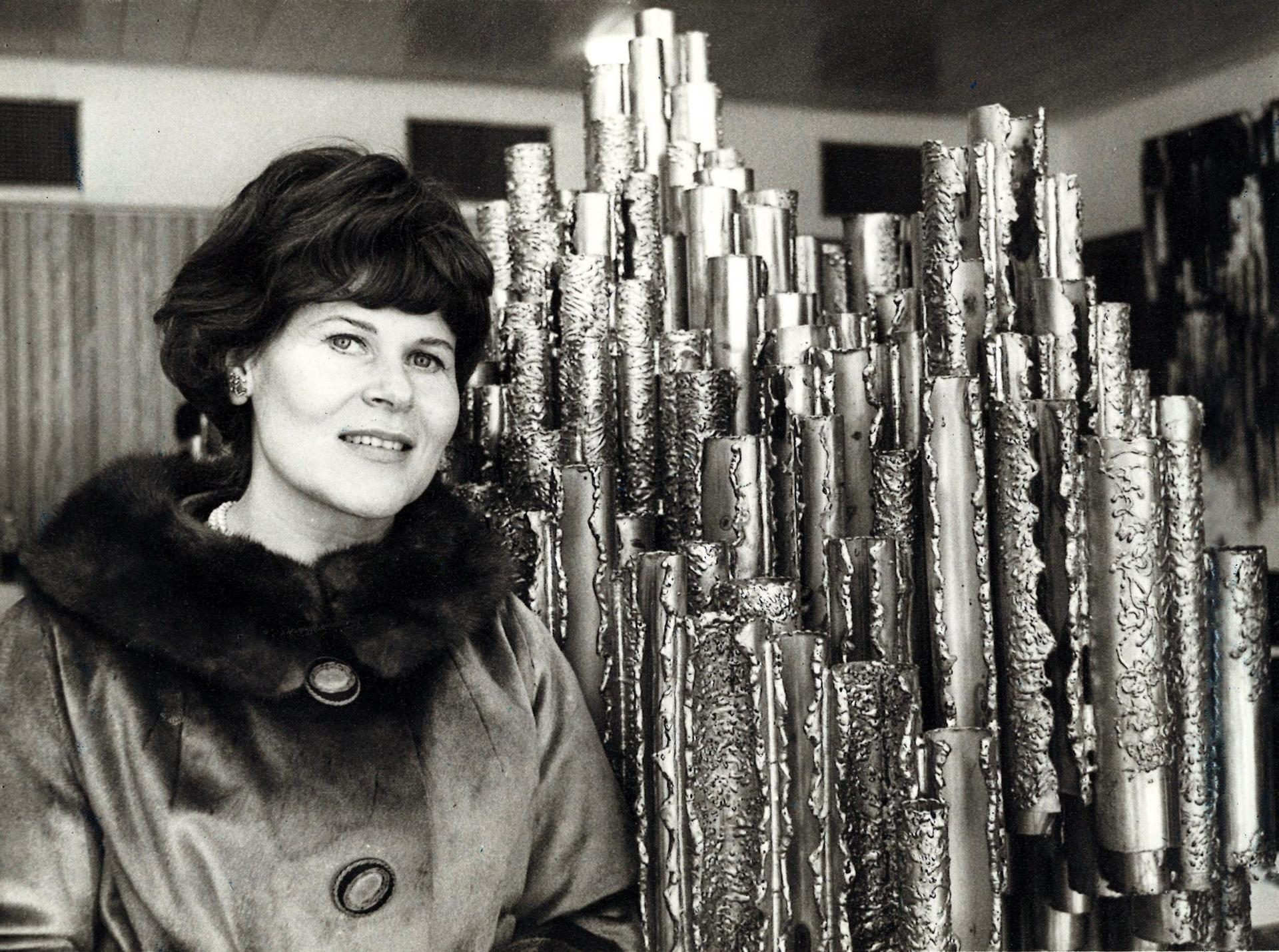
Eila Hiltunen in 1965, with her detailed miniature of the Passio Musicae

The competition generated extensive public comment, which Hiltunen—who reported receiving hate mail—characterized as a "downright psychotic". (Note: Finnish: "Suomen kansan suorastaan psykoosin valtaan".) Advocates of the figurative approach described Passio Musicae as a "tin can" and the "work of a madwoman", complained that its most evident musical connection was to an instrument for which Sibelius had written very little, and critiqued the choice of welded metal as beneath the dignity of a national hero (unlike chiseled stone or cast bronze). Others wrote that Passio Musicae would dishonor Sibelius's memory and disgrace the country. Illustrative of the figurative–abstract fault line was a series of essays in the Swedish-language newspaper Hufvudstadsbladet, in which the conductor and composer Simon Parmet criticized Hiltunen's non-representational design, while the art critic Erik Kruskopf defended it.

The committee's final meeting occurred on 13 November 1962, with both radio and television reporters in attendance. Although a majority of members voted in Hiltunen's favor, it ruled that to continue, she must add to her design a more substantial figurative portrait of Sibelius—a concession to Passio Musicae's critics. In response to Hiltunen's inquiry, the committee recommended that she depict Sibelius in his forties or fifties—that is, accomplished but still creatively active. On 24 June 1963, Hiltunen showed the society a scale model of her proposed high-relief portrait of Sibelius, cast in stainless steel; the society approved and commissioned Hiltunen shortly thereafter.

=== Construction ===
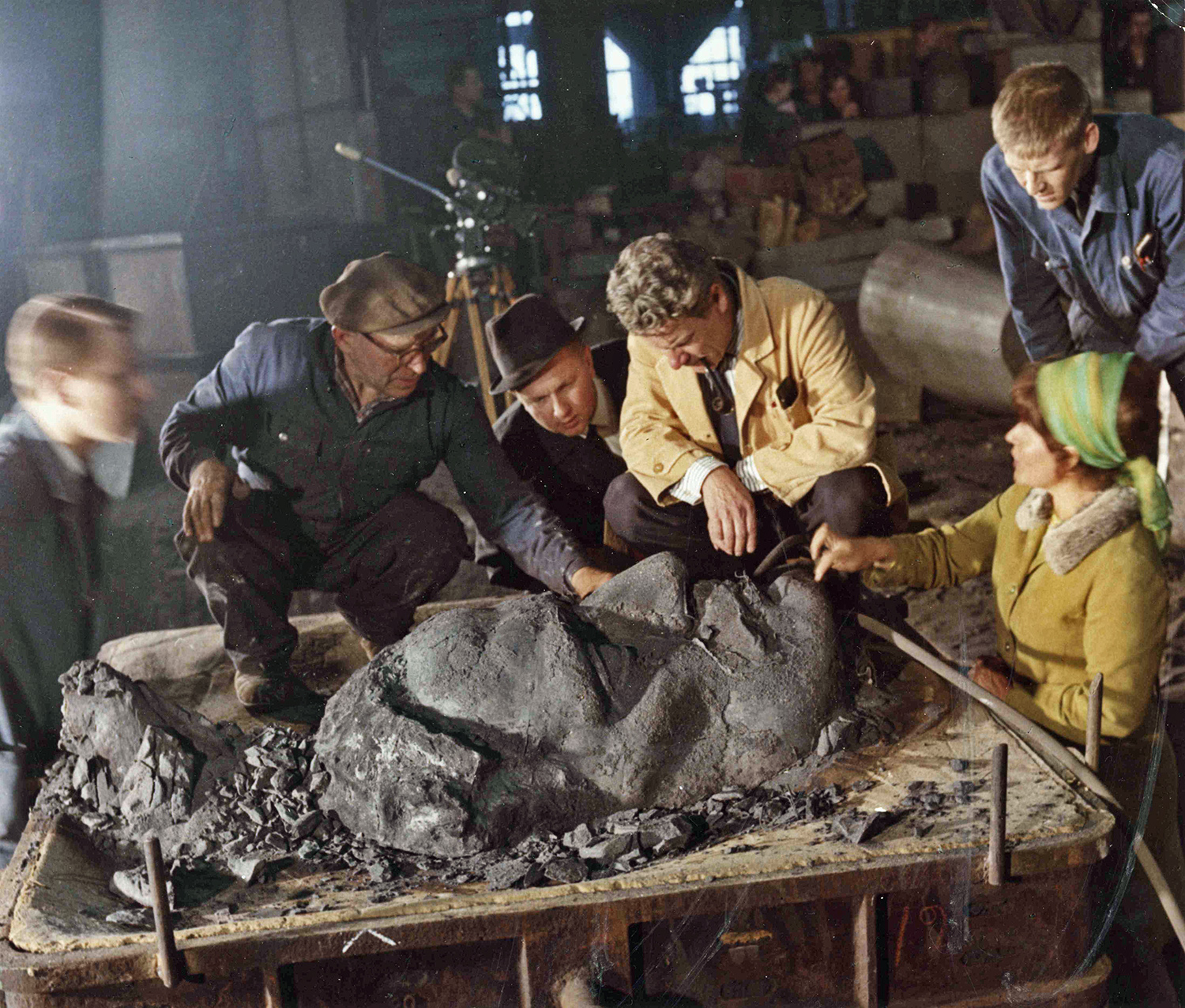
Hiltunen (bottom right) at work on her high-relief portrait of the composer

Although the Sibelius Society had hoped to dedicate the Sibelius Monument in time for the centennial of the composer's birth in December 1965, the protracted competition put the project behind schedule. Hiltunen first made studies in stainless steel, and she completed a 1:5 scale miniature, as well as full-scale partial models, in the summer of 1964. She worked at the same unheated, poorly-ventilated industrial hall in Lauttasaari where, years earlier, Aimo Tukiainen had made his equestrian statue of Field Marshal Gustaf Mannerheim. (Note: In 1954, Hiltunen entered the sculpture competition for the equestrian Mannerheim memorial. Although the commission eventually went to Aimo Tukiainen (the work of whom was unveiled in 1960), Hiltunen's proposal was purchased. Like the subsequent competition for a Sibelius monument less than a decade later, the Mannerheim memorial attracted ample press coverage and public debate, given its namesake's status as a national icon.) The stainless steel sheets came from the Ugine works in France and were first shaped into tubes at the Haato factory in the Korso district of Vantaa before being transported by truck to Lauttasaari. A 21-year-old tradesman, Emil Kukkonen, assisted the artist in welding the pipes together into 14 components to be assembled on-site in Sibelius Park. (Note: Despite some friction between the two, Kukkonen recalled that he had appreciated the importance of the task: "I immediately realized that [Eila's vision] was something new and good. My own eyes told me so. I expected it to be absolutely fantastic". (Finnish: "Tajusin heti, että tämä on jotain uutta ja hyvää. Omat silmäthän sen kertoivat. Odotin, että siitä tulee aivan fantastinen".) Hiltunen was sensitive about Kukkonen's contributions, and she asked that he refrain from talking to the press. Kukkonen attended the inauguration on 7 September 1967; however, he was not introduced. "People thought that Eila had done it alone", he recalled. "I don't get hung up on such trifles. Eila was a self-centered person, but she did appreciate me in her own way". (Finnish: "Ihmiset luulivat, että Eila yksin oli tehnyt sen. En takerru tuollaisiin pikkuseikkoihin. Eila oli itsekeskeinen ihminen, mutta kyllä hän minua omalla tavallaan arvosti".))

"It is strange to stare at that small red dot of molten metal. It hypnotizes me to the point where I fall into a strange state of deep concentration—as if I, too, were fused into the mass of this gigantic steel structure".

— Eila Hiltunen, on welding the Sibelius Monument (Note: The English text is translated from the Italian version of Hiltunen's 1992 compilation (Eila Hiltunen, Chapter: Scritti e sculture / Kirjoituksia ja veistoksia, p. 19, published in Milan by the Elemond Editori Associati), as cited in Limnell's 2018 Italian-language thesis. The Italian version reads: "È strano fissare quel piccolo punto rosso di metallo fuso. Mi ipnotizza al punto che cado in uno strano stato di profonda concentrazione—come fossi anch'io fusa nella massa di questa gigantesca struttura d'acciaio".)

Hiltunen textured the pipes with, as she called it, a "low-relief arabesque"; she sat on the pipes, wielding her Metal Inert Gas (MIG) welding torch with one hand while cooling the molten metal with the other; the job took several years. The welding generated toxic chromium, nickel, and molybdenum fumes, which Hiltunen inhaled; she was later diagnosed with asthma and bronchitis, which she attributed to her work on the monument after seeking occupational healthcare. The portrait was cast at Ahlström's, a foundry in Karhula, under manager Ilari Tuominen and process engineer Arvi Forss. Dissatisfied with the casting, Hiltunen ordered a second; however, it was no better, and so the first was installed on the monument. To ensure that neither the pipe cluster nor the portrait would patinate or corrode over time, Haato chemically pickled and passivated them after the welding and casting had finished.

On-site work began in November 1966, with the landscape architect Juhani Kivikoski—whom Hiltunen had consulted as far back as Credo—preparing the rocky site in Sibelius Park to meet the artist's requirements. In May 1967, Hiltunen and her team began erecting the monument, piecing together the 14 components. To provide adequate wind resistance, they dug holes 1.5 metres (4 ft 11 in) deep and reinforced underground components with additional steel and concrete. The inclusion of the high-relief portrait necessitated site alteration, as neither Hiltunen nor Kivikoski wanted it to lay flat on the granite, and no suitable vertical plane existed. They decided to manufacture a wall using rock blasting; the result turned out too short, and so the portrait had to be placed mostly above the rock cut. The relief was attached to the rock in July and final touches were completed in August. Other ideas the two had envisioned, such as an outdoor concert space and a canal that would have separated the monument from the park on a man-made island, had earlier been abandoned due to prohibitive costs and regulations. There were also issues with Hiltunen's fee, which the Sibelius Society reduced by a quarter on the pretext that the public disliked Passio Musicae; the actual reason, however, was that it had invested the project's funds in stocks that performed poorly. Hiltunen also recalled that the society was two years late with her final payment, which had lost 30% of its value due to the October 1967 devaluation of the Finnish markka.

=== Dedication ===
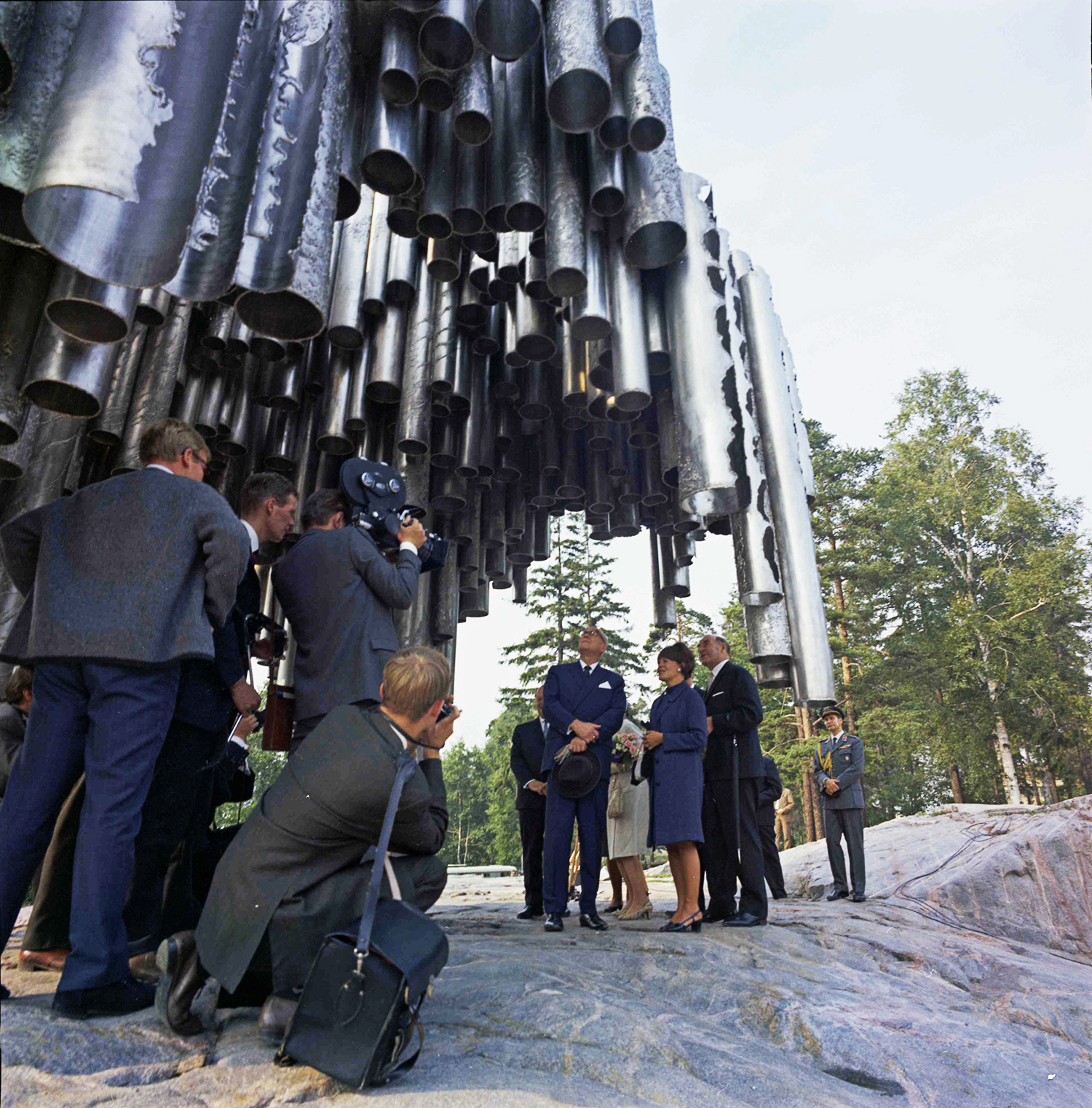
President Urho Kekkonen (blue suit) and the artist Eila Hiltunen at the 7 September 1967 dedication ceremony

The Sibelius Society donated the Sibelius Monument to the City of Helsinki at a ceremony on 7 September 1967. Among the guests in attendance were President Urho Kekkonen and First Lady Sylvi Kekkonen, as well as Sibelius's five daughters. The festivities began with the Preludio to Sibelius's Music for the Press Celebrations Days, which had not been performed since its 1899 premiere; Tauno Hannikainen conducted the wind section of the Helsinki Philharmonic Orchestra. Next came a dedication speech by the former president of the Sibelius Society, Lauri Puntila. This was followed by an acceptance speech on behalf of the city by the Chairman of the Helsinki City Council Teuvo Aura. The ceremony concluded with a performance of Sibelius's Finlandia. That evening at Messuhalli, Jorma Panula conducted a second concert, at which the Philharmonic performed more of Sibelius's music. (Note: The program of the evening concert was as follows: the Prelude to The Tempest; the complete four-number Belshazzar's Feast Suite; The Rapids-Rider's Brides, with the Finnish baritone Usko Viitanen as soloist; and the Second Symphony.)

Hiltunen thought a number of the Sibelius Society's actions toward her were discourteous. First, before the event, she had received an invitation addressed not to her but rather—given the social customs of the era—to "Mr. and Mrs. Otto Pietinen". (Note: In 1944, Hiltunen married the Finnish photographer Otso Pietinen, who specialized in advertising and object photography. Many of the photographs of the Sibelius Monument's fabrication and inaugural ceremony are by him.) Next, at the event, the society reserved seats for VIP dignitaries and guests but not for the artist and her family. Finally, after the event, the society asked Hiltunen not to attend a press conference for the international media; instead, it made available another Finnish sculptor, Laila Pullinen, who handed out her own catalogues. Hiltunen also struggled emotionally to relinquish her work. "She had given birth to a child, which she now had to give up," the artist's daughter noted, recalling that her mother had been in tears during the ceremony: "That pain was immense". (Note: Finnish: "Hän pyyhki kyyneleitä ja itkeä vollotti koko ajan. Hän oli synnyttänyt lapsen, jonka hän joutui antamaan pois. Luopumisen tuska oli valtava".) The artist's depression alarmed her family members and physician. Feeling isolated in Finland, Hiltunen established a second home in Monticchiello, Italy.

=== Post-dedication ===
==== Cultural diplomacy ====
The Sibelius Monument's international fame led the Finnish state to utilize it as a tool of cultural diplomacy. First, on 21 September 1967, Finland donated Hiltunen's stainless steel 1:5 scale miniature model to the UNESCO headquarters in Paris. UNESCO Director-General René Maheu received the gift—titled Hommage à Sibelius—from Finland's Minister of Education Reino Oittinen during a ceremony that Hiltunen attended. The sculpture was installed on the Delegates' Patio (Patio des Délégués) adjacent to the Y-shaped Secretariat building, within the water basin that feeds into the Japanese garden. Second, in October 1967, Finland donated a stainless steel full-scale partial study to the City of Montreal at the conclusion of the 1967 World Expo, at which Hiltunen had participated with the work. (Note: The Nordic Pavilion at Expo 67 included three sculptors from each Nordic country, with the exception of Iceland, which had one representative. The two other Finnish sculptors were Laila Pullinen with Kevät ihmisessä ('Spring within a Human') and Kain Tapper with Pakkanen ('Frost'). In 1964, Tapper had sculpted Nuori Sibelius ('Young Sibelius'), a figurative statue of the composer for Hämeenlinna, Sibelius's birthplace. It is cast in bronze and rests on a black granite pedestal. Tapper had won the city's contest in 1961.) The sculpture went missing in the 1990s. Third, on 29 September 1983, Finland donated a stainless steel full-scale partial study to the Headquarters of the United Nations in New York City. Secretary-General Javier Pérez de Cuéllar received the gift from President Mauno Koivisto during a ceremony that Hiltunen attended. The sculpture was installed on the east side of the Visitors' Plaza.

==== Controversies over copyright ====
Hiltunen accused other artists of violating her copyright at least twice. The first incident occurred in January 1970, when the Finnish press challenged the originality of a public art sculpture—Norra skenet ('Northern Light')—at Umeå University, Sweden, created in 1969 by the Swedish sculptor Ernst Nordin. Hiltunen addressed the matter in January 1970, stating that Norra skenet bore an obvious resemblance to the partial study Finland had donated to Montreal. She also disclosed that she had received a preemptive letter from Norra skenet's manufacturer, the steel factory Nyby bruk, asserting that Nordin's sculpture did not resemble her own; representatives from the mill had interviewed her three years prior regarding the Sibelius Monument's fabrication. Nevertheless, Hiltunen declined to pursue legal action.

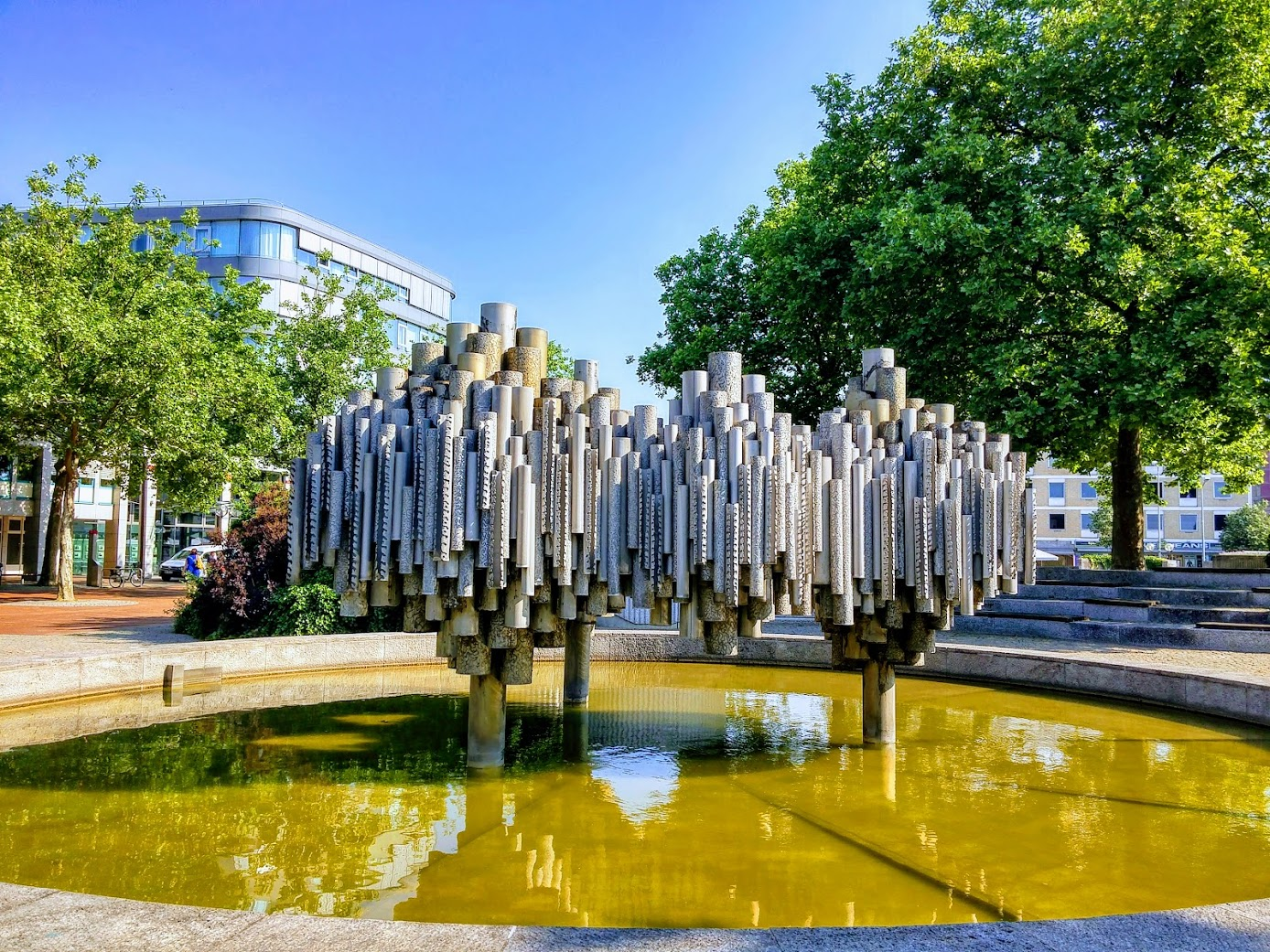
Röhrenbrunnen (Wolfsburg, 1977), by Rolf Hartmann

A second incident occurred in December 1991, when Hiltunen became aware of a public art sculpture—Röhrenbrunnen ('Tube Fountain')—in Wolfsburg, Germany, created in 1977 by the German sculptor Rolf Hartmann. Hiltunen enlisted a German law firm to demand the removal of the fountain, which she argued plagiarized the miniature Finland had donated to UNESCO. Apparently unknown to Hiltunen, a September 1977 article in the German newspaper Wolfsburger Allgemeine Zeitung had earlier raised the possibility of plagiarism. Hartmann defended himself against Hiltunen's 1991 accusation, stating that he had been welding and cutting pipes to make art since the 1950s. The result of the legal dispute is not known.

==== Tourism ====
Since its dedication in 1967, the Sibelius Monument has become one of the most recognized sights of the Helsinki cityscape and ranks among Finland's most visited tourist attractions. It receives approximately half a million visitors each year.

== Description ==
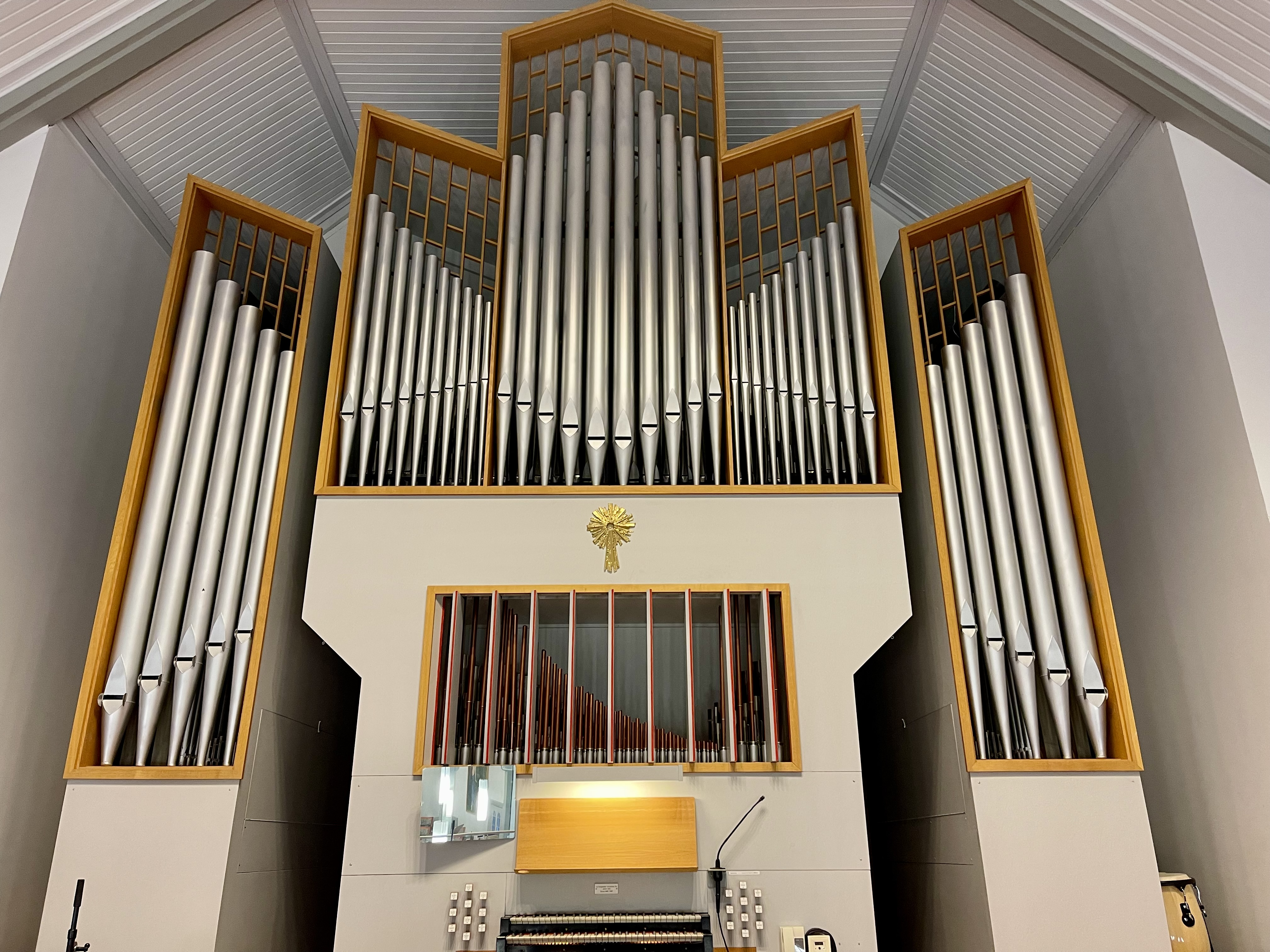
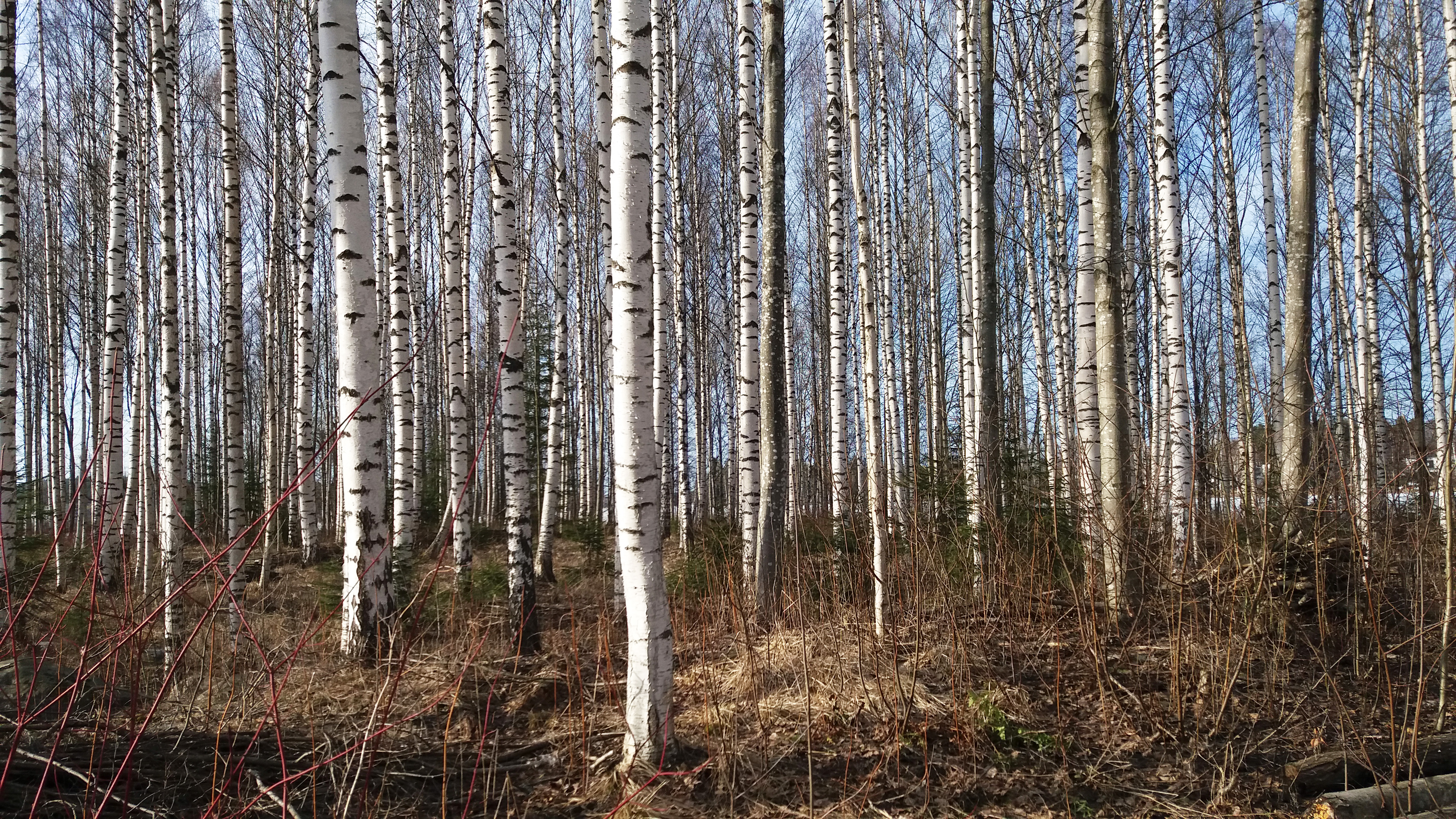
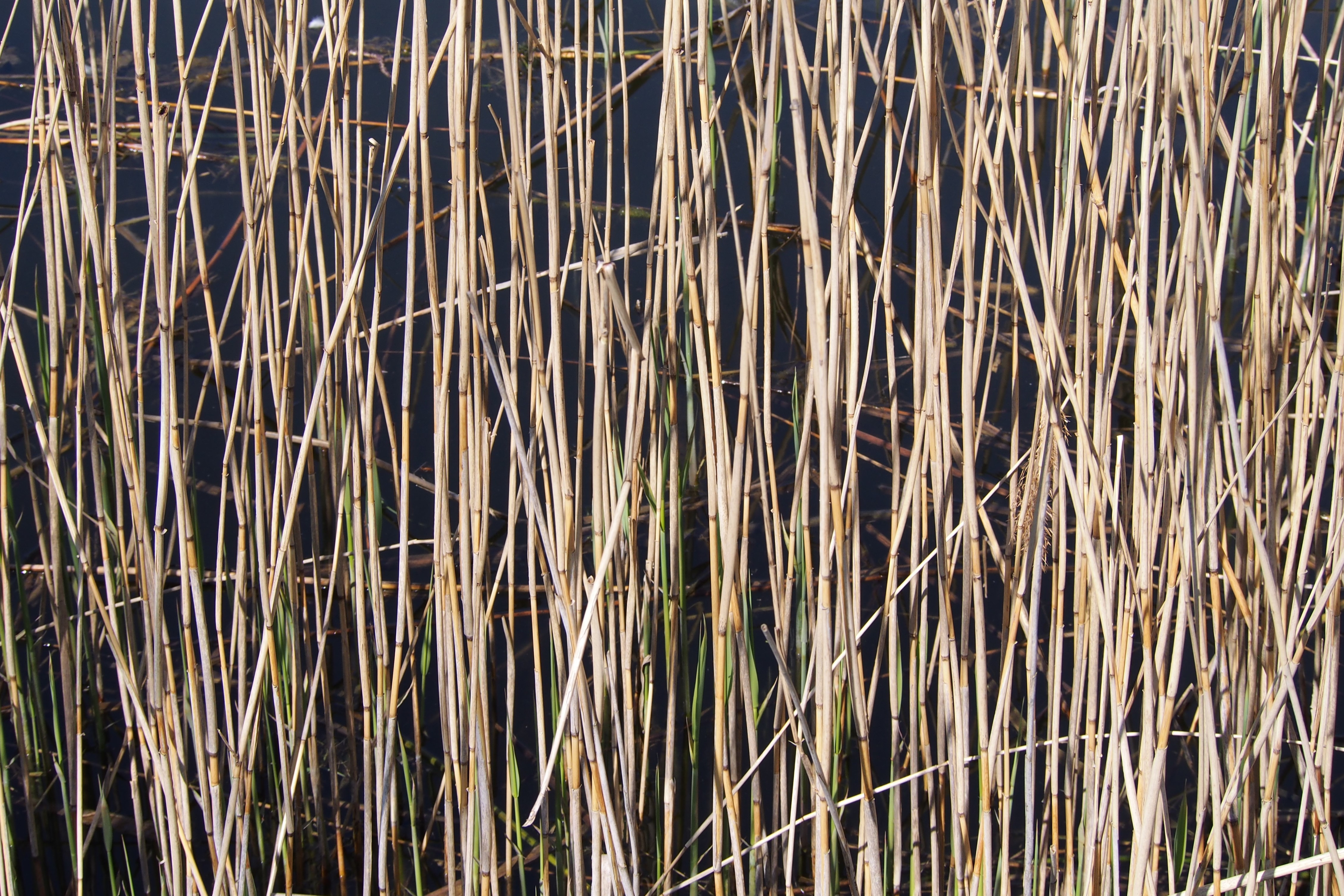
Some observers find the monument's pipe cluster representational of organ pipes (top). Others see elements of the Finnish landscape, such as its birch forests (middle) and shore reeds (bottom).

The Sibelius Monument comprises two distinct elements. The first, original to Hiltunen's proposal, is an abstract welded cluster of 569 acid-resistant stainless steel pipes—hollow and of varying lengths and diameters. Hiltunen hand-textured these; additionally she pierced several of the steel cylinders with open fissures, to manipulate light and shadow. The pipe cluster, which weighs 24 tonnes (24 long tons; 26 short tons) and measures 8.5 by 10.5 by 6.5 metres (28 ft × 34 ft × 21 ft), stands on three legs and has an undulating form. Visitors can stand within the resulting cavity.

Hiltunen intended the pipe cluster to symbolically evoke Sibelius's music. Nevertheless, many observers find the sculpture representational of an organ, while others see a nod to Finnish nature, such as its birch woodlands, shore reeds, the aurora borealis, or a glacier reshaping the rocky soil. The sculpture blends into the surrounding sylvan terrain, its steel reflecting sunlight differently depending on the time of day, weather, and season. Although Hiltunen did not design Passio Musicae to be a sound sculpture, the monument can generate sounds due to wind and rain, and echo voices and birdsong.

The high-relief stainless steel portrait of Sibelius, framed by three free-form shards

The monument's second element, which the Sibelius Society required Hiltunen to include, is a high-relief figurative portrait of the composer, cast in acid-resistant stainless steel and positioned on a granite wall about 15 metres (49 ft) from the pipe cluster. The portrait portrays a "pensive" Sibelius in his forties (c. 1910–11), framed by three free-form shards. The portrait is about 1 metre (3 ft 3 in) high. (Note: The portrait's width and depth dimensions, as well as its weight, are not readily available.) In 2003, the City of Helsinki installed a plaque on the granite wall to the far right of the portrait. Its text, which is in Finnish, Swedish, and English, reads: "Passio Musicae / 1967 / Monument to commemorate the composer Jean Sibelius (1865–1957) / Sculptor / Eila Hiltunen". (Note: Finnish: "Passio Musicae / 1967 / Säveltäjä Jean Sibeliukselle (1865–1957) omistettu muistomerkki / Kuvanveistäjä / Eila Hiltunen"; Swedish: "Passio Musicae / 1967 / Minnesmärke över kompositören Jean Sibelius (1865–1957) / Skulptör / Eila Hiltunen".) As part of the city's art collection, the monument is managed and curated by the Helsinki Art Museum.

== Modern reception ==
While the reception of the Sibelius Monument in the modern era has overcome the polarized discourse that accompanied its commissioning, its artistic merit still divides observers. In her biography of Hiltunen, the art historian Leena Ahtola-Moorhouse, for example, described the monument as "unquestionably one of the most impressive memorials in Finnish art", praising in particular its scale and rhythmic form, as well as the surrealist aura of its ever-luminous silver color. The art historian Göran Schildt also evaluated the Sibelius Monument favorably in his 1970 survey of modern sculpture in Finland, calling it "a marvelous nest of steel tubes ... a block of frozen music". Schildt argued that the full-scale realization of the piece ultimately vindicated Hiltunen's monumental vision, given that only once inside the structure can an observer "lose oneself in its all-embracing beauty" and ascertain Passio Musicae's true "spiritual purpose and authority". Conversely, the musicologist Carol Steyn and the art historian Estelle Alma Maré offered a tepid assessment, arguing the monument's unavoidable evocation of organ pipes ultimately undermined its claim to capture Sibelius's oeuvre (given his dearth of compositions for organ), while the possibility of a birch forest is too remote. They also criticized the figurative portrait for looking "strangely disembodied, even decapitated", despite being a faithful likeness.

Assessments of the Sibelius Monument occasionally appear in travelogs and content related to the composer. For example, the music critic for The Los Angeles Times, Mark Swed, dismissed the monument as being of "surpassing ugliness". An unfavorable 2002 review that ran in The Times criticized Hiltunen's sculpture as an eccentric tribute that made the viewer think less of Sibelius and more of "Dalí exploding a pipe organ, covering it in stainless steel and getting a giant three-year-old to weld it together again". In contrast, an earlier piece in The Atlanta Journal-Constitution praised the "spectacular" and "moody" work for perfectly capturing the composer's music; it also complimented its non-conformity, given that the Finns had opted for a monument so different from the conventional statues to composers that dot European cities. Additionally, the Sibelius biographer and musicologist Daniel Grimley applauded the monument's pipe cluster as "remarkable" for its kinship to Sibelius's music, in particular its "dual sense of stillness and momentum" and affinity for the "elemental, animating forces of the Finnish landscape".

== Legacy ==
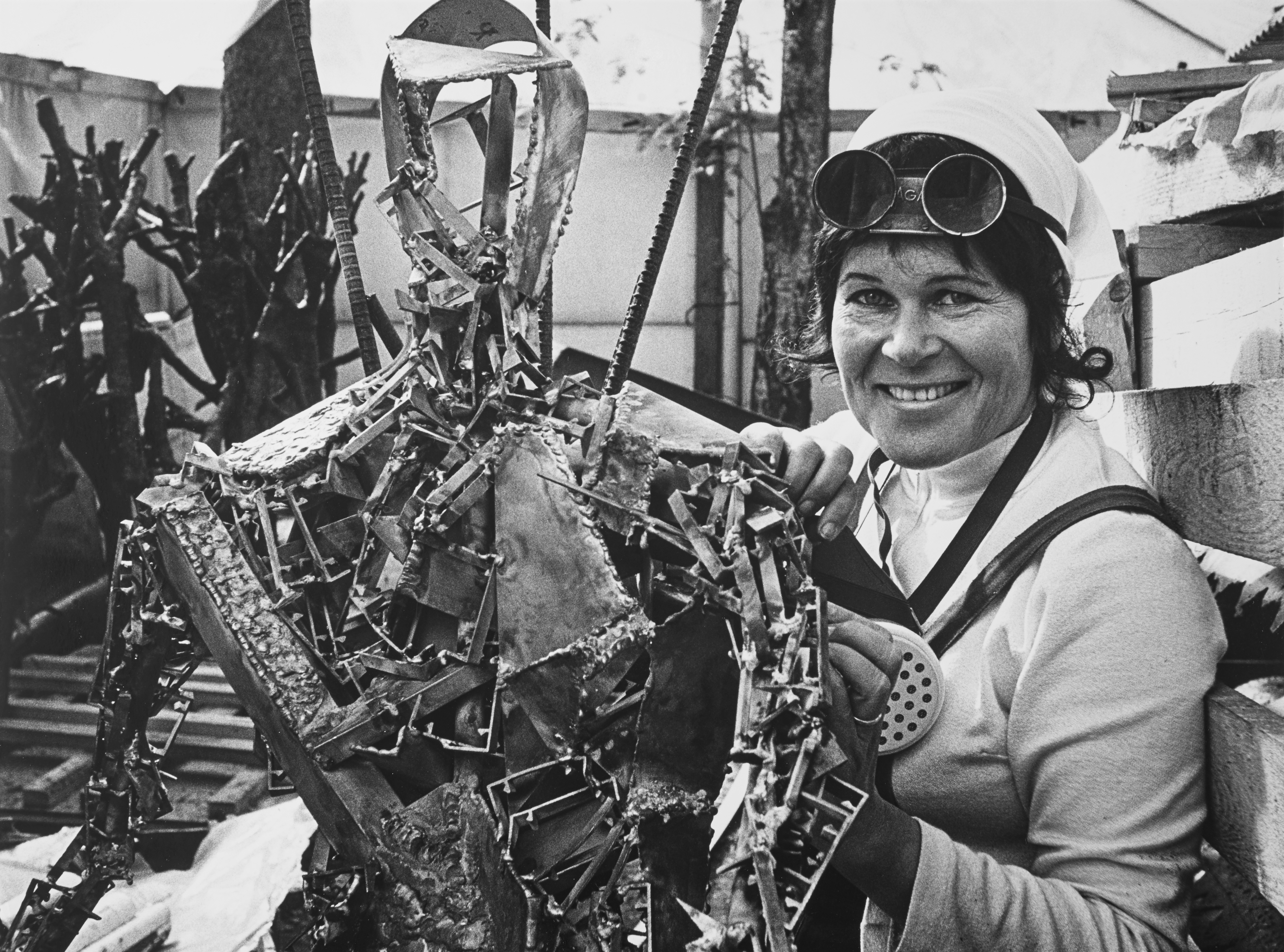
While the Sibelius Monument earned Hiltunen the reputation of being one of Finland's most important sculptors, it also overshadowed the rest of her oeuvre.

According to academic commentary on the Sibelius Monument, it proved influential in several respects. Most immediately, it helped earn Hiltunen the reputation as one of Finland's most important sculptors, and international recognition, exhibitions, and commissions followed. Retrospectives on Hiltunen's career regard the monument as her masterpiece. However, its fame also burdened the artist professionally: she became known as "the lady who made the Sibelius Monument" and the rest of her oeuvre was overshadowed.

"People think that when nine to thirteen buses are taken to the Sibelius Monument every day, it is a big deal for me. At the time, I could not imagine that only that sculpture would define my life, when I have works on a total of four continents".

— Eila Hiltunen, in her 2000 Finland Prize acceptance speech (Note: Finnish: "Ihmiset luulevat, että kun Sibelius-monumentille viedään yhdeksästä kolmeentoista bussia päivittäin, se on suuri asia minulle. Aikanaan en voinut kuvitella, että vain tuo veistos määrittäisi elämäni, kun minulla on töitä kaikkiaan neljässä maanosassa".)

The Sibelius Monument also coincided with shifts in mid-century Finnish culture. Prior to its commissioning, traditional, figurative sculpture had dominated Finland's civic memorials, a "nationalistic classicism" isolated from international modern trends that, according to Schildt, reached its zenith with Tukiainen's 1960 equestrian statue of Mannerheim. Although an artistic reaction was already underway by the time the Sibelius Society held its own competition in 1961, this conservative preference nearly scuttled Hiltunen's abstract approach to the country's next monumentalizing of a "great man". By successfully navigating this hostile environment, Hiltunen was able to aid the broader artistic shift towards modernism: given the widespread public affection and critical approval that Passio Musicae received at and following its unveiling, non-representational public art monuments, as an artistic approach, were both vindicated and normalized in Finland. Reflecting such changes in opinion, in 1975, Severi Saarinen—the president of the Sibelius Society during the competition who had vigorously opposed Hiltunen's abstract design—asked Hiltunen if she thought the figurative portrait of Sibelius should be relocated to another location, such as the performance venue Finlandia Hall. "Let it remain where it is", she responded, "as a testament to the mindset of that time and to how matters were resolved and brought to completion". (Note: Limnell (2018) does not provide original Finnish.)

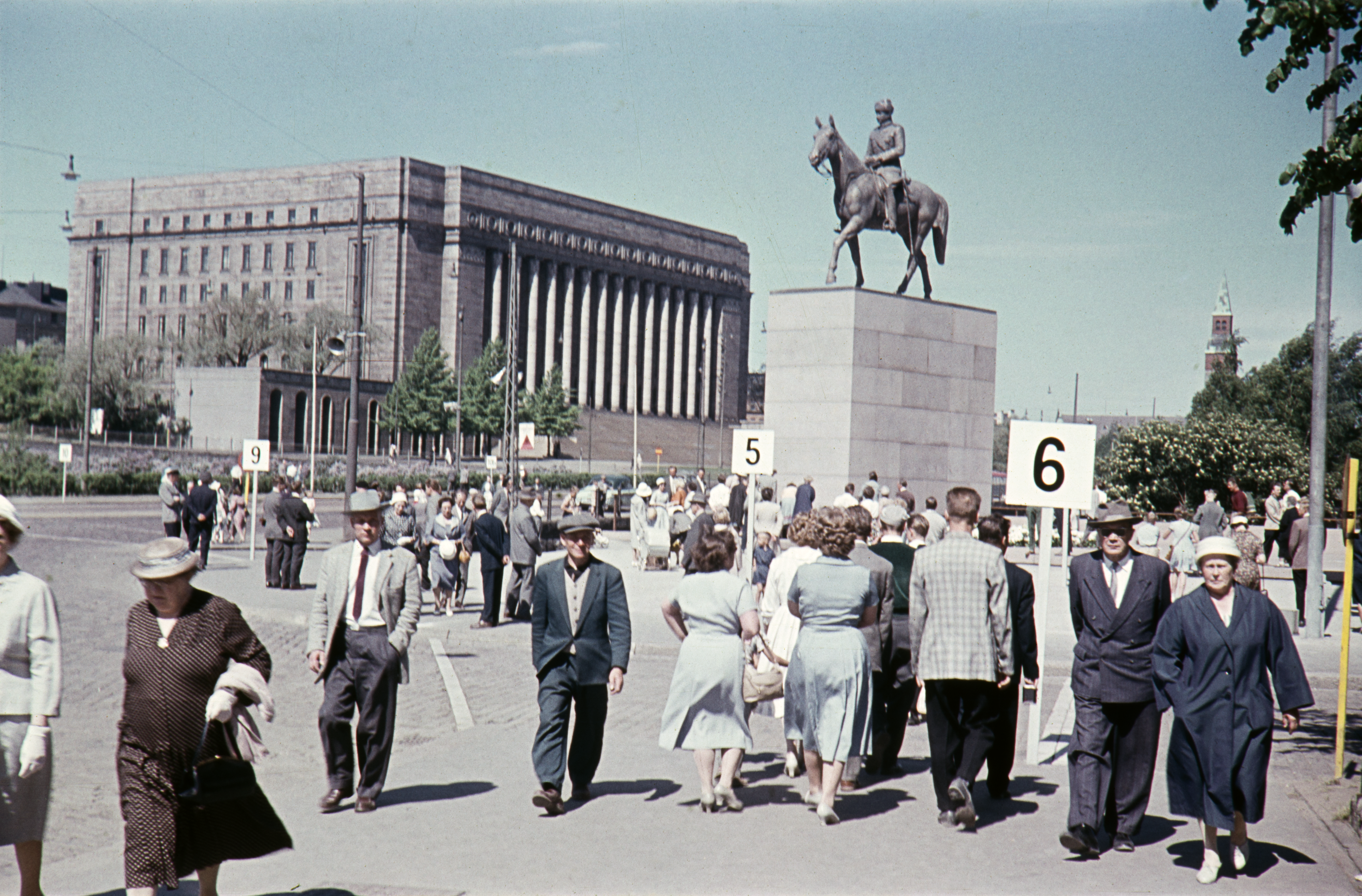
The Equestrian statue of Marshal Mannerheim (1960) by Aimo Tukiainen exemplifies the nationalist, conservative style that had dominated memorial art in Finland before the Sibelius Monument.

Beyond its stylistic impact, the Sibelius Monument challenged the contemporary gender dynamics of Finnish sculpture, a field men historically had dominated. The art historian Liisa Lindgren has argued that although post-war female sculptors had secured war memorial commissions and a degree of public prominence, they nevertheless consistently encountered the stereotype that women were physically and mentally best suited to small-scale, "intimate"—and thus "inferior"—sculptural forms. On the one hand, then, the Sibelius Monument marked a critical milestone as the first time a female artist had been entrusted with monumentalizing one of the nation's "great men". On the other hand, Hiltunen felt her femininity compounded the challenges of the project, forcing her to repeatedly prove her artistic and technical authority to the tradesmen who helped fabricate and install the monument. Similarly, the sculptor and academic Heidi Limnell has connected these same gender dynamics to the scrutiny Hiltunen faced for Credo and Passio Musicae, positing that while any abstract tribute to Sibelius would have run afoul of conservative tastes, Hiltunen's profile as a young, relatively unknown woman exacerbated the public backlash. The art historian Riitta Ojanperä, however, has commented that Hiltunen subverted traditional gender expectations by refusing to outsource the monument's construction; in doing so, she "produced a legendary image of a young female artist engaged in physically strenuous welding work".

The monument also helped reframe the memory of Sibelius. As the musicologist Daniel Grimley has observed, the boundary-pushing modernism of Hiltunen's monument to the composer can be understood within the context of his shifting critical reception, specifically the "tension" between his status as a "national romantic figurehead"—which a "potentially reductive" figurative statue would have exemplified—and his preferred identity as an international modernist. Similarly, the aesthetician Carmen Pardo Salgado has argued that Hiltunen's use of abstraction over realism and of steel over bronze and stone honors the intentions of a composer who was eager to discard restrictive nationalist interpretations of his oeuvre.

== Derivative works ==
In 1965, Hiltunen created the Sibelius Medal for the Sibelius Society. Cast in bronze, the medal's obverse features Hiltunen's high-relief figurative portrait of the composer (free-form shards included), with the text: Jean Sibelius / 1865–1965; the reverse reproduces Passio Musicae's pipe cluster. The society awards the medal to individuals and organizations for outstanding achievements related to Sibelius's music.

Finland's 2002 first day cover (FDC) honoring the Sibelius Monument

On 3 May 2002, the Finnish Post Office released a €0.60 stamp depicting the pipe cluster of the Sibelius Monument, including a first day cover (FDC) issued in Hämeenlinna, the birthplace of the composer. The FDC was commemoratively cancelled with a special pictorial postmark of Hiltunen's high-relief Sibelius portrait, with the encircling text "3.5.2002 Hämeenlinna Ensipäivä" ('First Day'). It also featured a cachet with a photograph of the monument's pipes on the left side of the envelope. (Note: The philatelic catalog identifiers for the issue are: Lape: 1619 FDC; Norma: 1639 FDC.)

In 2015, as part of a "sonified reinterpretation" of the monument, the German audio sculptor Lukas Kühne and the Finnish media artist Matti Niinimäki (assisted by art and design students from the Aalto University Media Lab) found that the pipe cluster's tubes should emit sounds ranging from 27 to 233 hertz. The team then produced an audio artwork for Ateneum that allowed visitors to move around a mapped virtual space of the 569 cylinders, triggering sounds.

In late 2016, as part of the government's "Suomi 100" project celebrating the centennial of Finnish independence in 2017, the Finnish master goldsmith Mika Tarkkanen developed Monument, a fine jewelry collection modeled after the Sibelius Monument. Because products based on the monument had previously not been permitted due to copyright, Tarkkanen sought and received approval from Eila Hiltunen's estate, which lent his shop some of the artist's original steel studies.

== See also ==
- Monumental sculpture
- Welded sculpture
- Modern sculpture
- List of women sculptors
