= Sibelius Society of Finland =

The Sibelius Society of Finland (Finnish: Sibelius-Seura ry, Swedish: Sibelius-Samfundet rf) is a society in Finland dedicated to the music of the Finnish composer Jean Sibelius. It was set up in December 1957. The Society and the Ministry of Education opened the composer and his wife Aino's Järvenpää house Ainola as a museum in 1974. Since 1965 they have also organised the International Jean Sibelius Violin Competition every five years.

From 1961 to 1962, the Sibelius Society held a nationwide sculpture competition to commission a memorial to Sibelius. This resulted in the Sibelius Monument (Passio Musicae) by the Finnish sculptor Eila Hiltunen, which the Society donated to the City of Helsinki at an unveiling ceremony on 7 September 1967.
