= Norra skenet =

Sculpture in Umeå by Ernst Nordin

Coordinates: 63°49′14.9″N 20°18′8.8″E

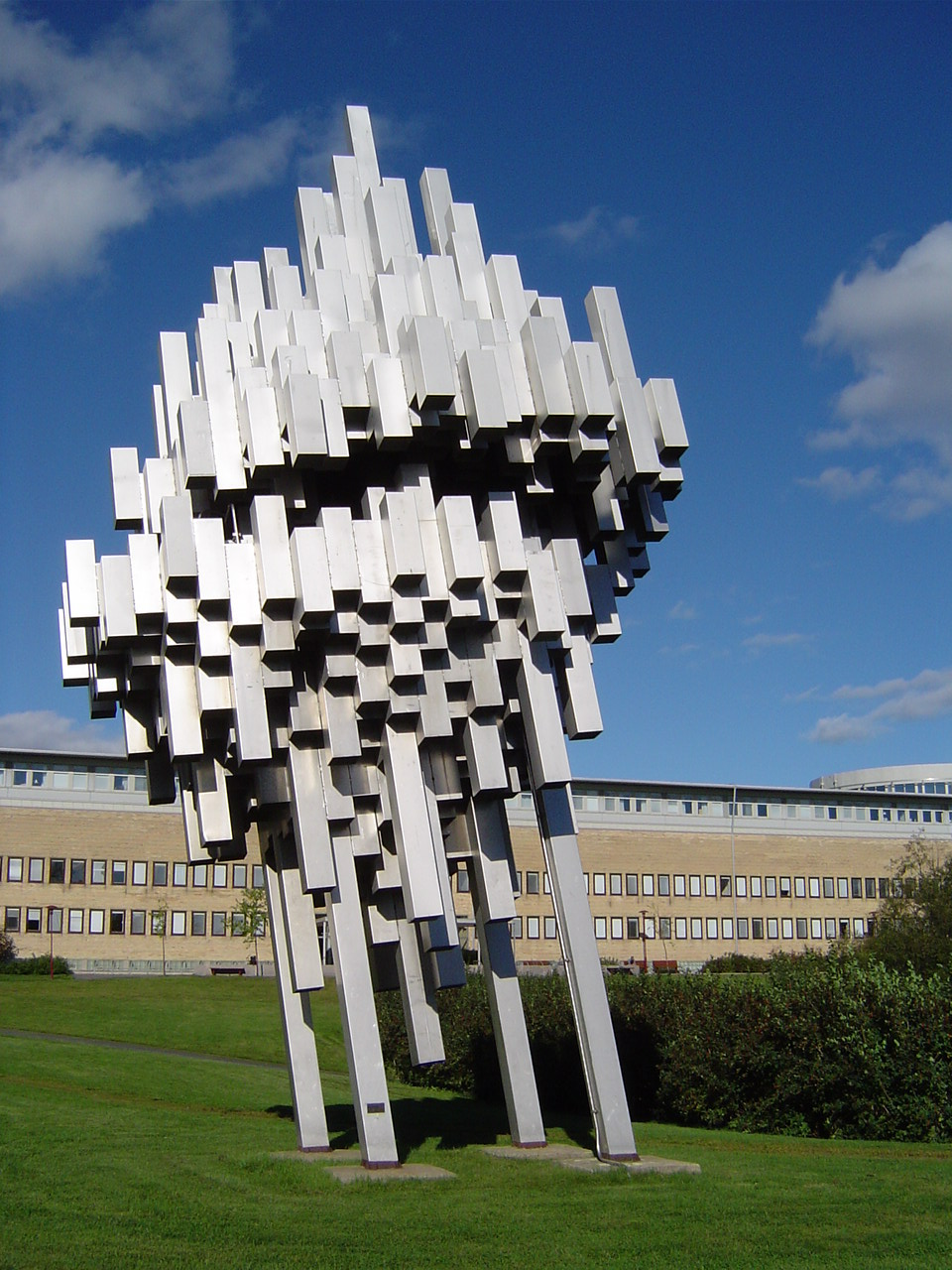
Norra skenet

Norra skenet (English translation: 'Northern Light') is a stainless steel public art sculpture by the Swedish artist Ernst Nordin at the Umeå University campus in Umeå, Sweden.

== History ==
As part of the planning of the Umeå University campus, a competition for a sculpture was held 1967 and won by Ernst Nordin. Norra skenet was raised 1969 at the campus and moved to the actual location close to the University Dam in 1995, due to the construction of the Teachers' Training Hall.

The sculpture is made of polished stainless steel. Rectangular steel pipes have been welded together in a diagonal composition, resembling Aurora Borealis (Northern Lights). The structure is lit by built-in spotlights.

Umeå University makes use of the sculpture as a symbol in its marketing.

Following its inauguration, Norra skenet became the subject of controversy when Finnish sculptor Eila Hiltunen alleged that its design too closely resembled her Sibelius Monument, though she ultimately chose not to pursue legal action.
