= Sibelius Park =

Public park in Helsinki, Finland

Coordinates: 60°10′53″N 24°54′50″E

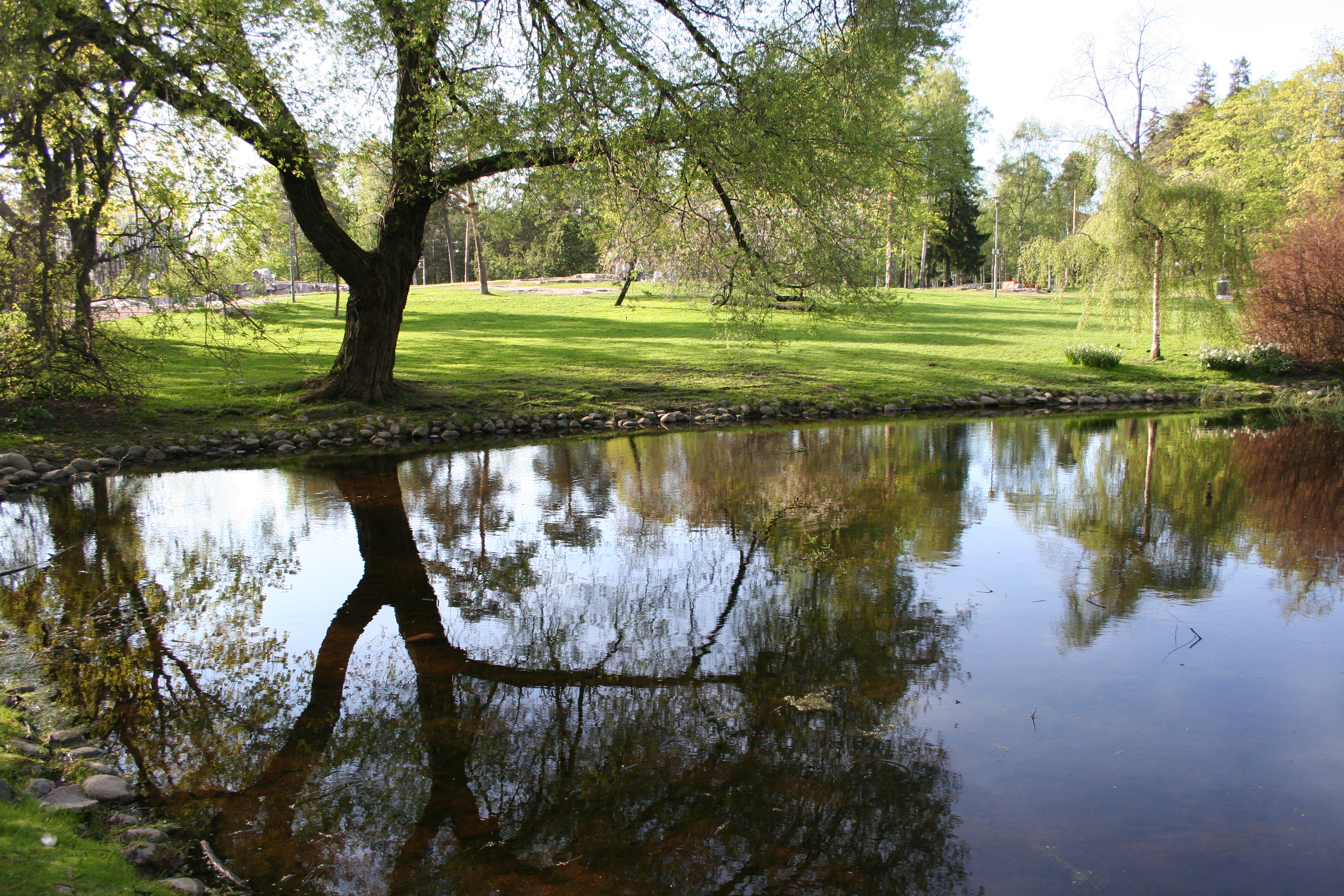
Sibelius Park, with the Sibelius Monument in the distance (top left)

Sibelius Park (Finnish: Sibeliuksen puisto; Swedish: Sibeliusparken) is a public park in the Töölö district of Helsinki, the capital of Finland. Its creation was led by the city in the 1930s, and it was officially named in honor of the country's most famous composer, Jean Sibelius, on occasion of his 80th birthday, on 6 December 1945. The landscape architects Emil Aranko and Bengt Schalin were responsible for the park's development and had plantings, a pond, and a fountain installed. Since the late 1960s, Sibelius Park has been best known as the site of the Sibelius Monument, a 1967 public art memorial to the composer by the Finnish artist Eila Hiltunen.

Sibelius Park includes two other art installations in addition the Sibelius Monument, each across Mechelininkatu (Mechelin Street) on the east side of the park. The first is the sculpture Ilmatar and the Scaup (Finnish: Ilmatar ja sotka) by Aarre Aaltonen, who completed the Kalevala-themed bronze in 1946. The second is the Memorial for Ingrian and Karelian War Veterans (Finnish: Inkeriläisten ja karjalaisten heimoveteraanien muistomerkki) by Yrjö Sormunen, a 2007 granite tribute to the tribal units who fought with the Finnish Defense Forces during the Continuation War of 1941–1944.
