= Lukas Kühne =

German sound sculptor

- Known for: Sound sculpture
- Movement: Site-specific art; Sound art
- Website: www.lukaskuehne.com

Lukas Kühne is a German sound sculptor. His best-known works consist of resonating concrete chambers that are tuned to react to certain pitches. Kühne's site-specific sculptures stand in public spaces in Estonia, Finland, Iceland, Germany and Uruguay.

== Artistic career ==
Between 1999 and 2001, Kühne created the "sound station", one of the seven "sense stations" in the park of the senses in Weissensee, Berlin.

Kühne developed the Space and Frequency project with Robyn Schulkowsky in 2005, with monumental and interdisciplinary exhibitions in New York City, Helsinki and Brussels. He curated several exhibitions of sound art, such as Espacio y Frecuencia in the National Museum of Visual Arts (MNAV) and Rumbo al Ruido in the MAPI Museum for Pre-Columbian Art, both in Montevideo, Uruguay.

He created Cromatico, a permanent sound sculpture on Tallinn's Sound Festival Grounds, for the Tuned City Tallinn event in 2011. Cromatico is tuned to the F chromatic scale, with each of the 12 chambers corresponding to a pitch along the scale from 88 Hz (F) to 164 Hz (E). It won the Grand Prix of the Concrete Building of the Year competition by Estonian Concrete Association in 2011. His other contribution to the soundscape of Tallinn was the idea to use the historic Seaplane Harbour hangar, a pre-modernist concrete structure, as a "sonic landmark". The hangar became one of the pieces of "aural architecture" where artists experimented and worked during Tuned City Tallinn 2011.

Tvísöngur, opened in 2012, consists of five interconnected concrete domes on the hillside above Seyðisfjörður in east Iceland. It is a tribute to the Icelandic cultural heritage of polyphonic duets, or "twin-singing". The five domes, reaching a height between 2 and 4 meters, amplify and resonate with the tones of consecutive fifths, which form the basic structure of the musical form. The sculpture is accessible to visitors, who can experiment with the sounds. The choice of building material is also related to Iceland, which has a tradition of monumental concrete buildings such as Hallgrímskirkja. Two years later, Kühne built a similar installation, the Hailuoto Organum, in Finland.

Together with a working group of 8 Aalto University postgraduate students, Kühne created a virtual, playable version of the Sibelius Monument inside Ateneum, the National Gallery of Finland in Helsinki, as part of a larger exhibit honouring Jean Sibelius' jubilee year. The piece was later presented at ISEA 2015 in Vancouver, Canada.

Kühne founded the Experimental Format of Form and Sound (Taller Experimental Forma y Sonido) in 2005 and the International Festival of Sound Art Monteaudio (Festival Internacional de Arte Sonoro Monteaudio) in 2013, both at the University of the Republic in Montevideo. One of his works is on permanent display in the city: tubófono, a musical instrument located in Parque Rodó.

He lives in Berlin and Montevideo.

== Major works ==
- Cromatico, Tallinn, Estonia (2011)
- Tvisöngur, Seyðisfjörður, Iceland (2012)
- Organum, Hailuoto, Finland (2014)
- Onkai, Totsukawa Village, Japan (2025)
