= Aimo Tukiainen =

Finnish sculptor

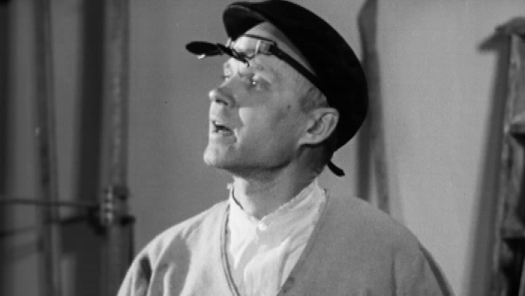
- Born: 6 October 1917; Orivesi, Finland
- Died: 3 June 1996 (aged 78); Helsinki, Finland

Aimo Johan Kustaa Tukiainen (October 6, 1917 – June 3, 1996) was a sculptor from Finland. His best-known work is the Equestrian statue of Marshal Mannerheim in Helsinki.

Tukiainen's wide and versatile production mainly consists of a large amount of monumental works, portraits, medals and small sculptures.

Tukiainen played a central role in the Finnish art world of 20th century. In addition to his artist's career he chaired both the Artists' Association of Finland and the Association of Finnish Sculptors.

In 1962, Tukiainen bought a property caller Purnu in Orivesi near his place of birth and made it his summer atelier. In 1967, he invited his six fellow artist to organize a summer exhibition to celebrate their 50th birthday. The summer exhibitions were organized then roughly every second year. The original group had also their 60th and 75th birthday exhibitions there.

== Photos of Tukiainen's works ==
| Name | Year | Material | Location |
|---|---|---|---|
| Consumer family | 1950 | gray granite | Kluuvi shopping centre, Helsinki |
| Profit | 1954 | bronze, water feature | University of Economy, Runeberginkatu 14, Helsinki |
| Tree of Wisdom | 1954 | granite | Amuri school, Tampere |
| Altar piece in Salla church | | bronze | Salla |
| Juhani Aho | 1961 | bronze | Engel square, Eira, Helsinki |
| Market life in Hakaniemi | 1961 | metal | Metro station, Hakaniemi, Helsinki |
| Solukko | 1963 | bronze, water feature | Mänttä |
| Vaiennut linnake (Quiet fort) | 1963 | bronze | Tainionkoski graveyard, Imatra |
| Elonvirta – päiväperho (Stream of life) | 1966 | bronze, water feature | Koukkuniemi, Tampere |
| Miina Sillanpää memorial | 1968 | bronze | Tokoinranta, Helsinki |
| Virvatulet / Suomalaisen sotilaan muistomerkki | 1971 | bronze | Koskipuisto, Tampere |
| Katkaistu elämä, Sankarihauta | 1973 | bronze | Lauttasaari, Helsinki |
| Lalli | 1989 | bronze | Köyliö |
