= Toivo Jaatinen =

Finnish sculptor

Toivo Jaatinen (August 1, 1926 in Sortavala – November 14, 2017 in Nurmijärvi) was a Finnish sculptor, recipient of the prestigious Saltus Award in 2002.

== Background ==
Jaatinen studied visual arts at Helsinki Central School of Art and Design and the Academy of Fine Arts school. Jaatinen first medal created in 1962 for the Railway Board. Since then he designed several medals and won four times in Finnish Medal Art Guild's annual medal competition (1965, 1967, 1973 and 1994). The Guild also chose a medal made by Jaatinen as the best all-time Finnish medal.

Jaatinen lived in Nurmijärvi, which has housed several of his works from 1964.

Jaatinen was also an art teacher at the Helsinki University of Technology and the Finnish Academy of Fine Arts School.
