= Lauri Puntila =

Finnish historian and politician (1907–1988)

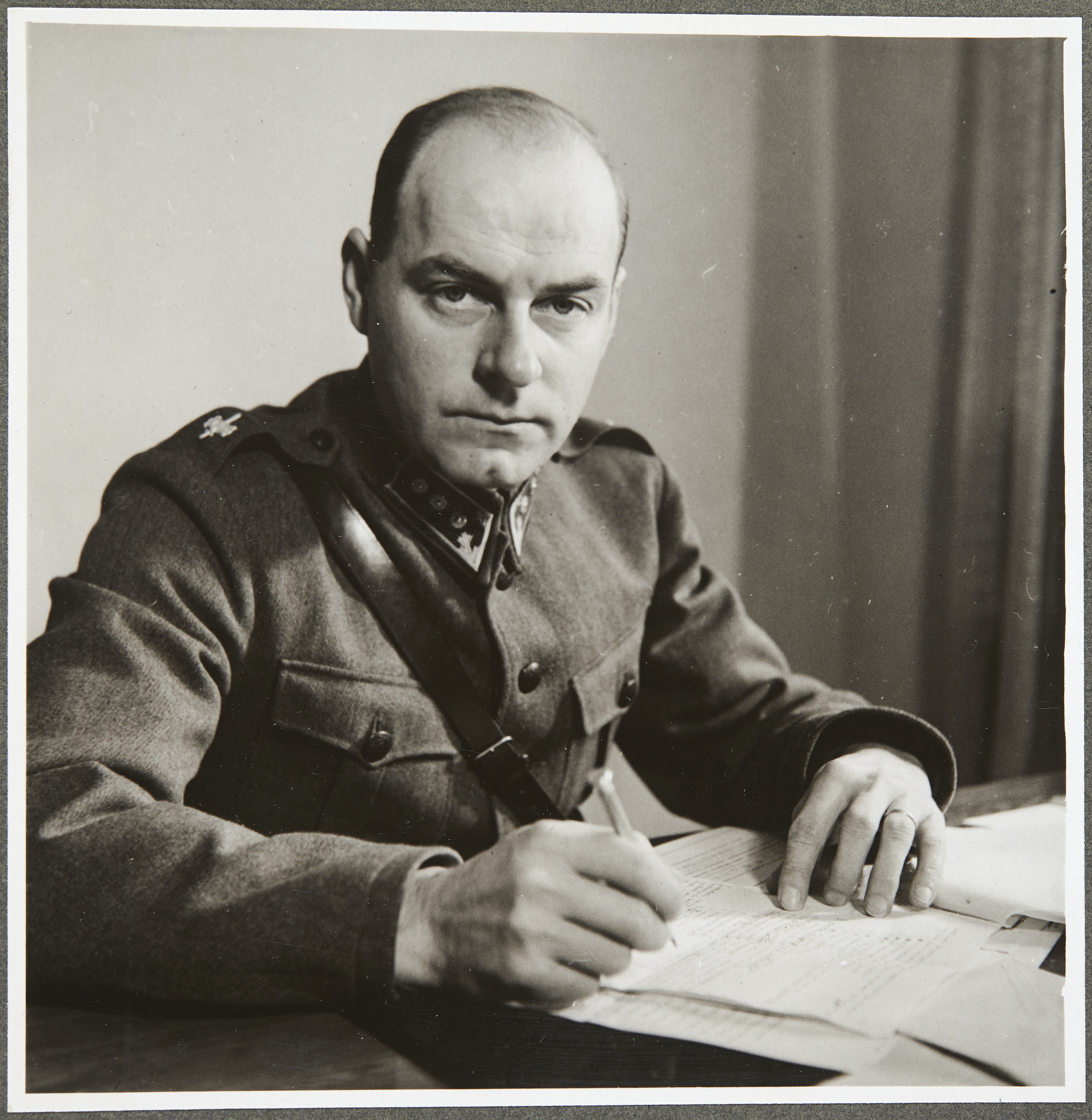
L. A. Puntila in 1941

Lauri Aadolf (L. A.) Puntila (24 August 1907 – 24 May 1988) was a Finnish historian and politician, born in Hattula. He was a member of the Parliament of Finland from 1966 to 1970, representing the Social Democratic Party of Finland (SDP).
