= Compositions for organ by Jean Sibelius =

Pieces for solo organ by Jean Sibelius (1925–1931)

Pieces for organ
- by Jean Sibelius
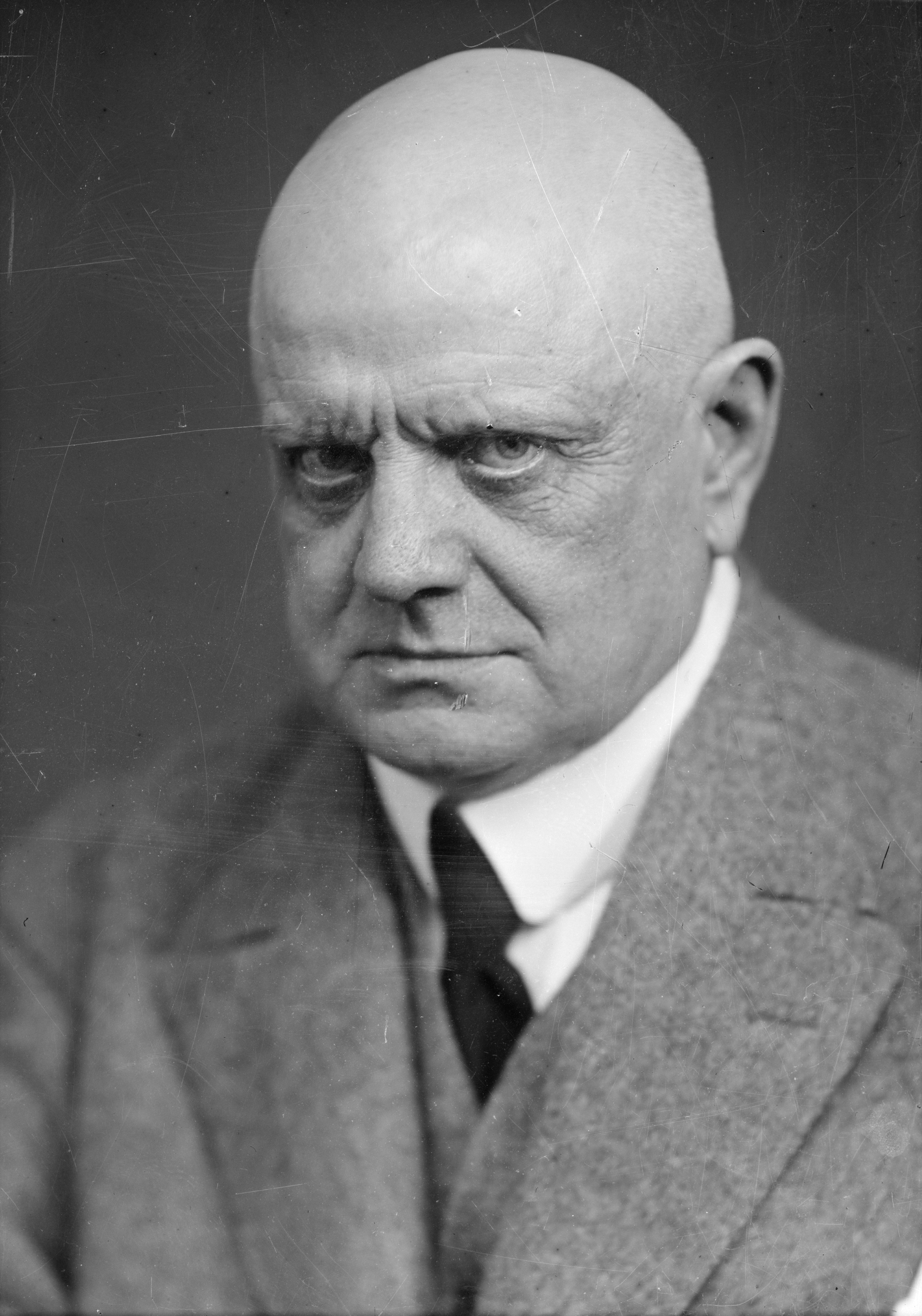
- The composer (c. 1927)
- Catalogue: JS 153
- Opus: 111, 113
- Composed: 1925–1927, 1931

Late in his career from 1925 to 1931, the Finnish composer Jean Sibelius wrote six pieces for solo organ, chronologically as follows: Intrada, Op. 111a (1925); Preludium and Postludium, JS 153/1–2 (1926); Avaushymni (in English: Opening Hymn) and Surumarssi (in English: Funeral March; in French: Marche funèbre), respectively Nos. 1 and 10 from the Op. 113 Masonic Ritual Music (Vapaamuurareiden rituaalimusiikkia; 1927, revised 1948); and Surusoitto (in English: Funeral Music), Op. 111b (1931). Of the six, the most important and oft-recorded is Intrada, which over the decades has become "something of a display piece" for domestic organists.

== Music ==
=== Op. 111 pieces ===
==== Intrada ====
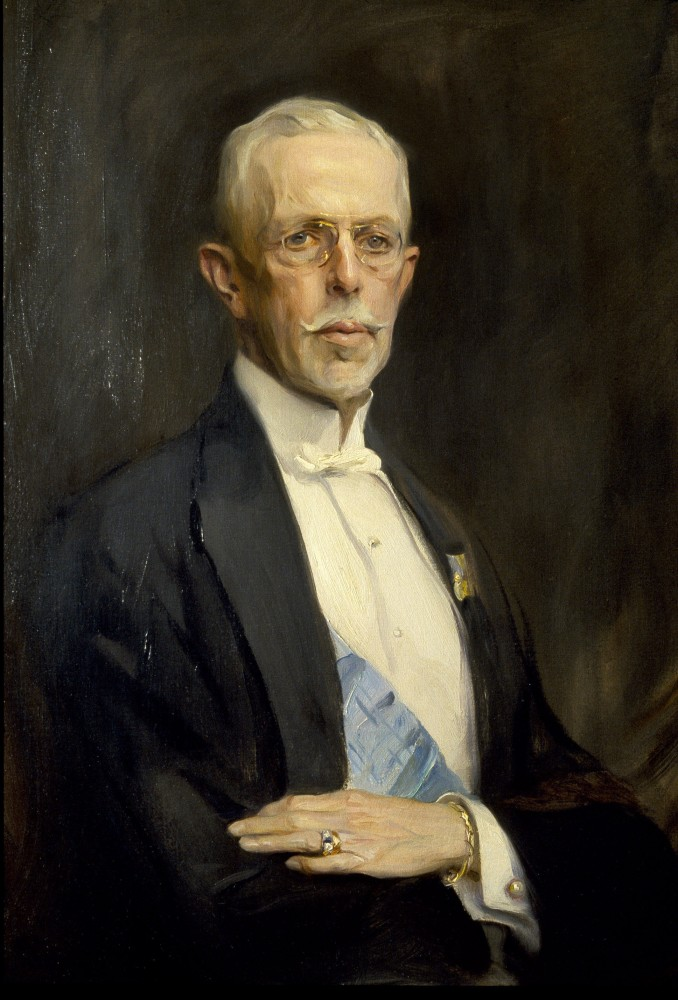
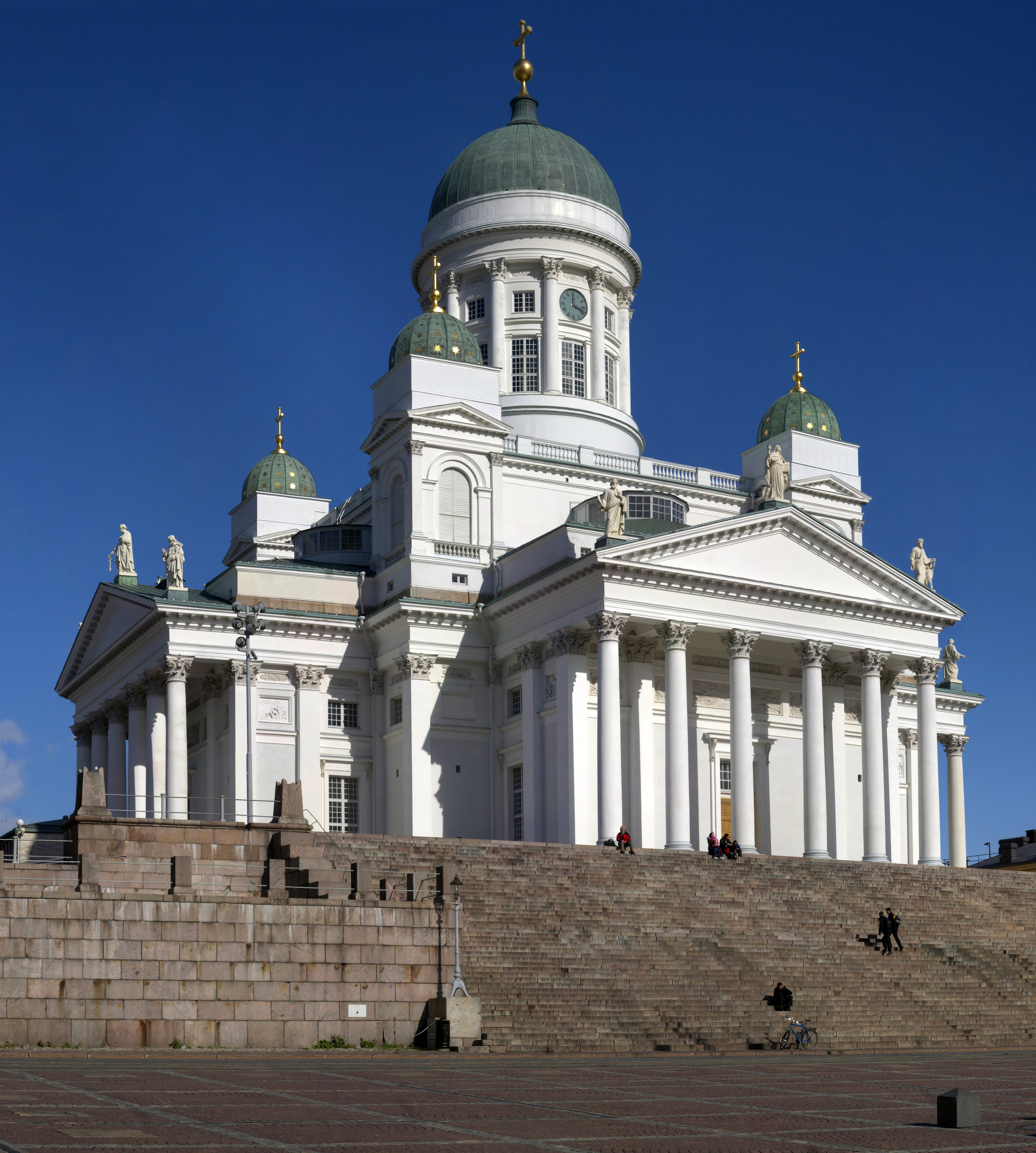
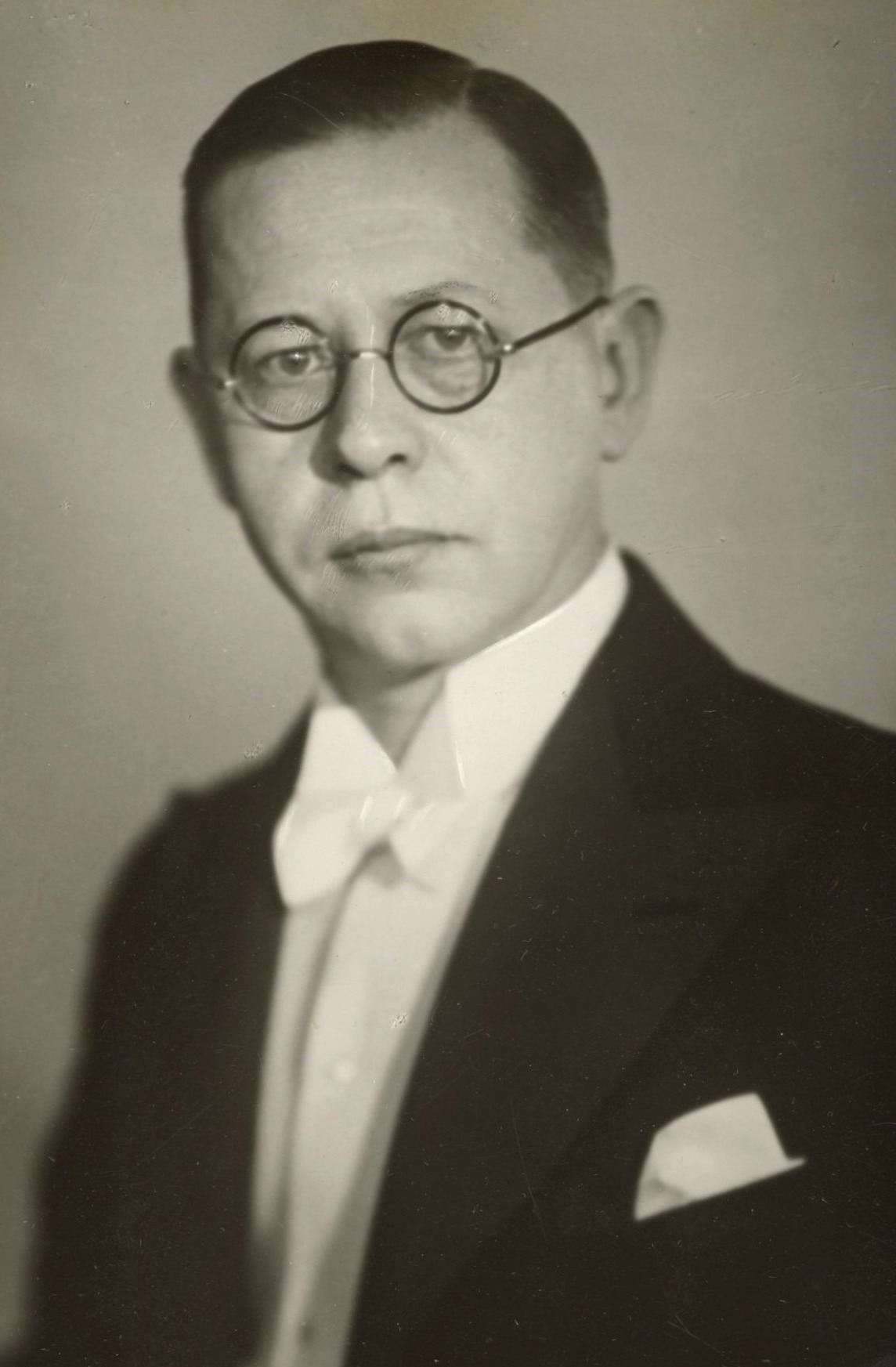
Sibelius wrote Intrada (Op. 111a) on occasion of the 1925 state visit of King Gustav V of Sweden (left); the Finnish organist John Sundberg (right) premiered the piece at Helsinki Cathedral (center).

In August 1925, Sibelius paused work on his major project at the time, the incidental music to The Tempest (Op. 109) to compose an occasional piece for solo organ—a genre that he had never before attempted. The event was the state visit of King Gustav V of Sweden, who was scheduled to attend a special church service at Helsinki Cathedral (then known as Nikolai Church). Sibelius responded with Intrada, "a monumental, hugely dignified piece", that the Finnish organist John Sundberg—with whom the composer had consulted on the capabilities of the cathedral's organ—premiered on 22 August.

Intrada takes about 5 minutes to play; its time signature is 3/2 and its tempo marking is Largamente molto (poco adagio). Stylistically, it is related to the Symphony No. 7 (Op. 105) from the previous year, as well as Prospero from The Tempest (Suite No. 2, Movement IV; 1926). It has since become one of the most performed pieces in the Finnish organ repertoire—indeed, "something of a display piece" for domestic organists. The Finnish firm R. E. Westerlund published the double pedal version of Intrada in 1943 and the single-pedal version in 1957. (Note: Intrada exists in both a version for single pedal and double pedal [HUL 0828]; a brief sketch [HUL 0052] is extant. They have been recorded by the Finnish organist Harri Viitanen as part of BIS's Sibelius Edition (Volume 13).)

==== Surusoito ====
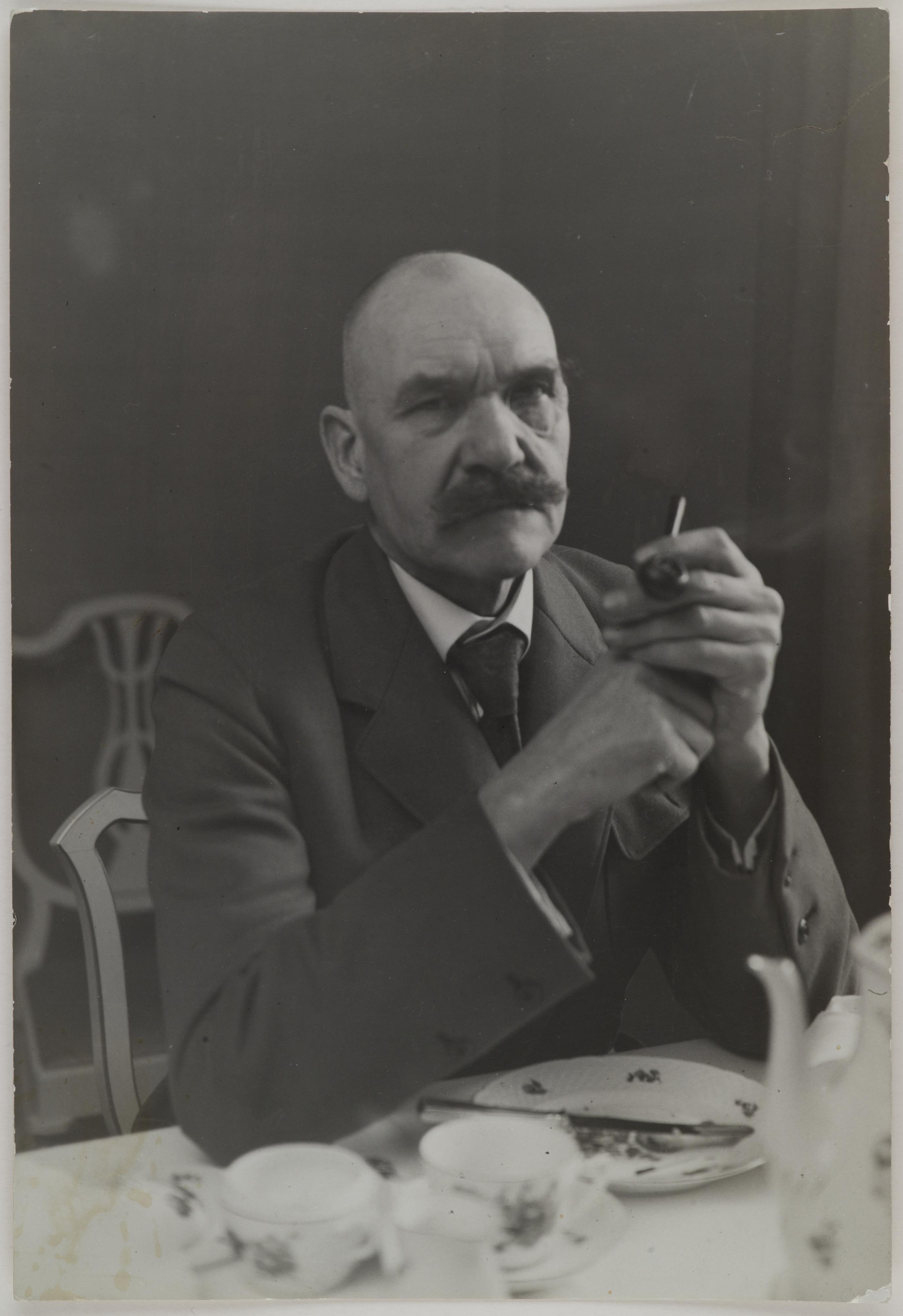
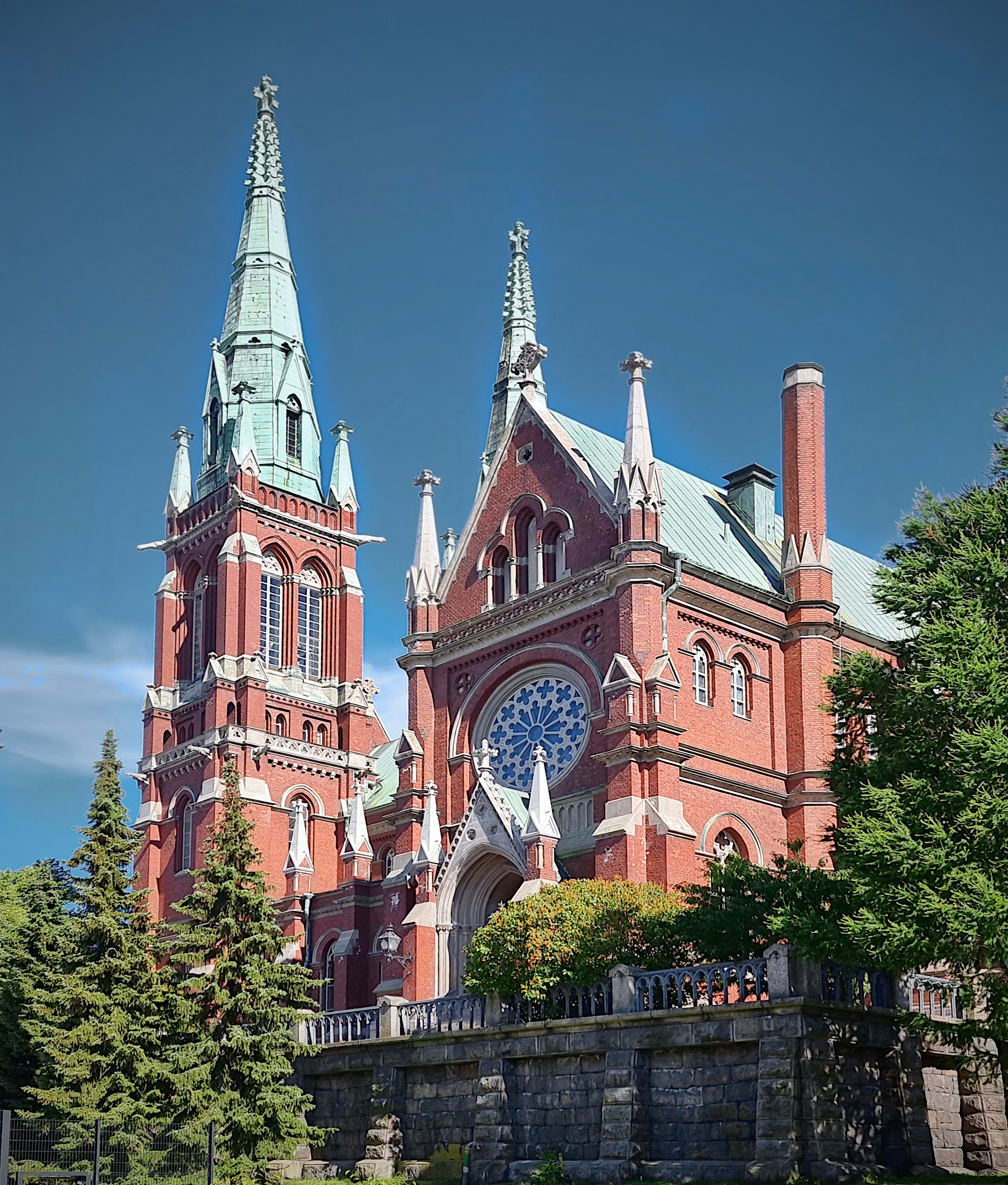
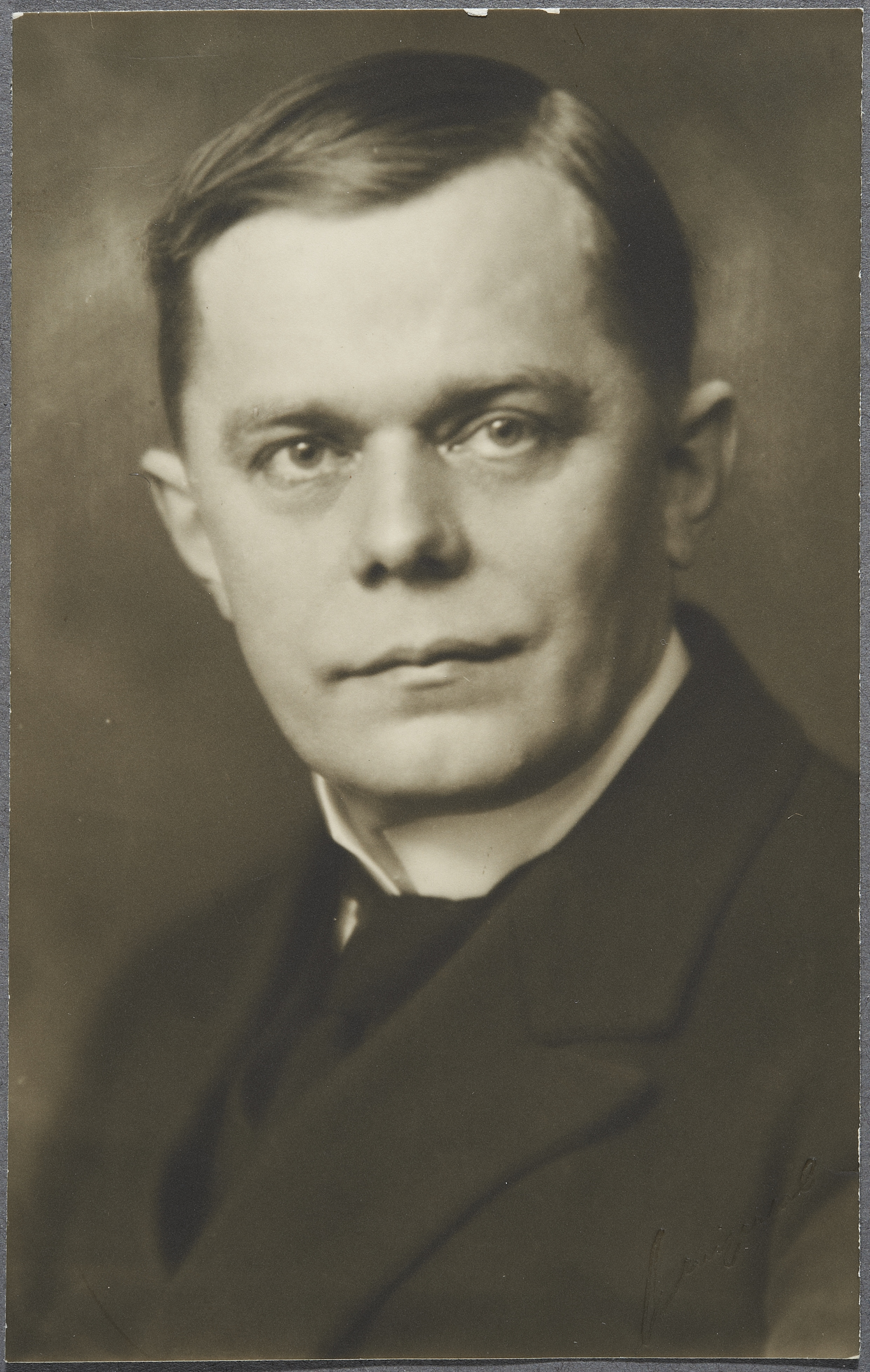
Sibelius wrote Surusoitto (Op. 111b) on occasion of the 1931 funeral service for the Finnish painter Akseli Gallen-Kallela (left) at St. John's Church (center). The Finnish organist Elis Mårtenson (right) premiered the piece.

On 7 March 1931, Sibelius's longtime friend, the Finnish painter Akseli Gallen-Kallela, died. At the request of the family, Sibelius contributed a new piece for solo organ, Surusoitto, which the Finnish organist Elis Mårtenson premiered during the 19 March funeral at St. John's Church. Sibelius, despite his aversion to funerals, served as a pallbearer. Westerlund published Surumarssi in 1955, and this differs in some respects from the autograph manuscript. These changes probably trace to Mårtenson, although it is possible that they came at Sibelius's request given the time crunch to meet his deadline. At any rate, their provenance cannot be established.

Surusoitto takes about 5.5 minutes to play; ; its time signature is 3/4 and it is without a tempo marking. (Note: Both a preliminary version and a provisional alternative [each HUL 1893] of Surusoitto are extant. They have been recorded by the Finnish organist Harri Viitanen as part of BIS's Sibelius Edition (Volume 13).) Stylistically, it may relate to Sibelius's subsequently abandoned Eighth Symphony (JS 190, 1924–c. late 1930s–1945), given the mystery of how he could have managed to compose such a "captivating and exciting", large-scale work for organ in the span of a few days. Indeed, the Finnish composer Joonas Kokkonen speculated to Aino Sibelius, Sibelius's widow, that be might have used material considered for the Eighth, which she found plausible. Barnett, however, has countered that at that point in the symphony's life, Sibelius had by no means given up on the project, and reusing material from viable, still-gestating symphonic work in another piece "would [have gone] against all the precedents ... he had established over almost fifty years". Instead, Barnett posits that while Sibelius may have considered material that ended up in Surusoitto for the Eighth, ultimately he must have had "already rejected [it] in a symphony context".

=== JS 153 pieces ===
A manuscript among Sibelius's estate (now in possession of the National Library of Finland) indicates that from 1925 to 1926, he intended to compose a five-number suite for organ, comprising the following titles:

- Preludium
- 'Interludium'
- 'Toos Hilarion Arioso'
- 'Intrada'
- Postludium. (Note: Dahlström notes that there is a "4-bar theme" ["4 Take Thema"] for the 'Interludium' and a "short theme" ["kurzes Thema"] for 'Toos Hilarion Arioso'. Barnett, however, notes that "no performable music exists" for these two numbers, as well as for the 'Intrada'.)

In the end, Sibelius wrote just two of the planned numbers: Preludium and Postludium, neither of which he designated with an opus number or sought to publish. (They are now known, respectively, as JS 153/1 and JS 153/2.) It is not possible based on existing evidence to determine if the 'Intrada' movement that Sibelius planned for the suite is the same as the Op. 111a piece of the same name. As the Sibelius biographer Andrew Barnett has noted, the manuscript indicates the key of E major for the suite 'Intrada', which is the same key as the Op. 111a Intrada. However, the latter is "a much more extensive and spectacular piece ... written for a much larger organ" than the suite's two extant numbers, leading to a perceived imbalance. It is possible that Sibelius, then, might have planned to "abbreviate and simplify" the Op. 111a Intrada, accordingly.

The Finnish organist Folke Gräsbeck premiered Preludium and Postludium on 15 June 2000 at Espoo Cathedral. They are in 6/4 time and 2/2 time, respectively; neither has a tempo marking. In 2001, Warner/Chappell Music Finland Oy published the two pieces, each of which takes about two-to-three minutes to play.

=== Op. 113 pieces ===
In 1922, freemasonry returned to Finland with the founding of the Finnish Lodge No. 1 (Suomi Loosi n:o 1) by Toivo Nekton and J. E. Tuokkola. Sibelius was among the inaugural class of 27 inductees, who were initiated on 18 August. The Lodge possessed a Mannborg harmonium, which Sibelius played. In 1927, Sibelius composed his Op. 113 Masonic Ritual Music (or, alternatively, Musique religieuse) for tenor and organ accompaniment (or harmonium, given the Lodge's own instrument) which the Finnish freemasons could use during meetings. This consisted of eight numbers, of which No. 1 Avaushymni and No. 8 Surumarssi were for solo organ. The former is in 3/2 time and is marked Adagio, whereas the latter is in 4/4 time and is without tempo marking. (Note: Two additional numbers from the Masonic Ritual Music have long passages, called processions, for solo organ: first, No. 3 Kulkue ja hymni: "Näätkö, kuinka hennon yrtin" (Procession and Hymn: "Though Young Leaves Be Green"); and second, No. 4 Kulkue ja hymni: "Ken kyynelin ei milloinkaan" (Procession and Hymn: "Who Ne'er Hath Blent His Bread with Tears"). The procession to No. 3 is in 2/2 time and is marked Poco allegro, whereas No. 4 is also in 2/2 but it sparked Marcia (Moderato).)

The Masonic Ritual Music was first published in 1936 by Galaxy Music in New York; this version contains nine numbers, with Surumarssi as No. 9, due to the addition of the song for male choir and organ. In 1948, however, Sibelius substantially overhauled the score, most notably adding three additional numbers that include male choir; this moved Surumarssi to No. 10. At this time, Sibelius also revised Avaushymni from its original key of E-flat major to G major; in addition, to both Avaushymni and Surumarssi, he made minor alterations to dynamics, phrasings, etc. Galaxy Music published the revised version in 1950.

== Discography ==
External audio
- Performed by Harri Viitanen
- Intrada, Op. 111a
- Surusoitto, Op. 111b
- Preludium, JS 153/1
- Postludium, JS 153/2
- Avaushymni, Op. 113/1
- Surumarssi, Op. 113/10

Sibelius's six pieces for organ received their premiere recordings in a piecemeal fashion, chronologically as follows:

- Avaushymni and Surumarssi (as part of the Masonic Ritual Music) in c. 1962 by Finnish organist Janne Raitio for Decca Records
- Intrada in 1975 during the Internationale Orgeltage Düsseldorf by the Finnish organist Folke Forsman
- Surusoitto in c. 1980 by the Finnish organist Matti Vainio for Finlandia Records
- Preludium and Postludium in 2004 by the Finnish organist Kalevi Kiviniemi for Fuga Records (Note: K. Kiviniemi–Fuga (FUGA–9182) 2004)

As of 2025, three organists have recorded all six pieces: Kiviniemi (2004, Fuga), Harri Viitanen (2010, BIS Records), and Jan Lehtola (2010, Alba Records). The sortable table below lists these and other commercially available recordings of Sibelius's organ pieces:

No.	Organist	Runtimes (Note: All runtimes are official, as printed on CD or LP liner notes.)						Rec. (Note: Refers to the year in which the performers recorded the work; this may not be the same as the year in which the recording was first released to the general public.)	Recording venue	Label	Ref.
No.	Organist	Op. 111a	Op. 111b	JS 153/1	JS 153/2	Op. 113/1	Op. 113/10	Rec.	Recording venue	Label	Ref.
1	Janne Raitio	—N/a	—N/a	—N/a	—N/a	?	?	c. 1962	[Unknown venue]	Decca	(Note: J. Raitio–Decca (SDLP 9007) 1962) (Note: This recording is of the Op. 113 Masonic Ritual Music.)
2	Folke Forsman	?	—N/a	—N/a	—N/a	—N/a	—N/a	1975	St. Franziskus Xaverius, Düsseldorf	[No label]	(Note: F. Forsman–No label (66.21 100) 1975)
3	Tauno Äikää	5:10	—N/a	—N/a	—N/a	3:50	2:20	c. 1977	[Unknown venue], Finland	[No label]	(Note: T. Äikää–No label (SLLP 3) 1977)
4	Christopher Dearnley	4:30	—N/a	—N/a	—N/a	—N/a	—N/a	1977	St Paul's Cathedral, London	Guild	(Note: C. Dearnley–Guild (GRSP 7011) 1977)
5	Matti Vainio	4:34	5:21	—N/a	—N/a	2:44	3:00	c. 1980	Taulumäki Church	Finlandia	(Note: M. Vainio–Finlandia (FA 318) 1980)
6	Maija Lehtonen	6:43	—N/a	—N/a	—N/a	—N/a	—N/a	1989	Turku Cathedral	MDG	(Note: M. Lehtonen–MDG (MD+G O 3387) 1991)
7	Paul Trepte	5:57	6:47	—N/a	—N/a	—N/a	—N/a	1992	Ely Cathedral	Gamut Classics	(Note: P. Trepte–Gamut Classics (GAM CD 532) 1992)
8	Seppo Murto	6:02	—N/a	—N/a	—N/a	—N/a	—N/a	1992	Helsinki Cathedral	Ondine	(Note: S. Murto–Ondine (ODE 787–2) 2019)
9	Roberto Cognazzo	—N/a	—N/a	—N/a	—N/a	1:54	2:46	1993	Studio mobile S.M.C. Ivrea	Associazione Cavalieri di Scozia	(Note: R. Cognazzo–Associazione Cavalieri di Scozia (OAT 931) 1993)
10	Dagmar Koptein	4:02	—N/a	—N/a	—N/a	—N/a	—N/a	1994	Rovaniemi Church	Danacord	(Note: D. Koptein–Danacord (DACOCD 420) 1994)
11	Hans-Ola Ericsson	6:39	6:28	—N/a	—N/a	3:23	5:47	1999	St. Petrus Canisius Church, Friedrichshafen	BIS	(Note: H. Ericsson–BIS (CD–1101) 2000)
12	Kalevi Kiviniemi (1)	6:16	5:55	2:19	3:06	2:45	4:26	2004	Stadtkirche Winterthur	Fuga	
13	Iain Quinn	5:31	5:12	—N/a	—N/a	—N/a	—N/a	2009	Coventry Cathedral	Chandos	(Note: I. Quinn–Chandos (CHAN 10581) 2010)
14	Jan Lehtola (1)	—N/a	—N/a	—N/a	—N/a	2:28	4:15	c. 2010	Kordelinin kappeli	Alba	(Note: J. Lehtola–Alba (ABCD 316) 2013)
15	Harri Viitanen	5:55	5:47	3:31	3:20	2:09	5:56	2010	Helsinki Cathedral	BIS	(Note: H. Viitanen–BIS (CD–1936/38) 2011)
16	Jan Lehtola (2)	5:40	5:05	2:59	2:38	—N/a	—N/a	2010	Kymiyhtiön ammattikoulu ^{(Op. 111a)}; Kalela ^{(Op. 111b)}; Amos Rex ^{(JS 153/1–2)}	Alba	(Note: J. Lehtola–Alba (ABCD 327) 2013)
17	Kalevi Kiviniemi (2)	5:58	—N/a	—N/a	—N/a	—N/a	—N/a	2012	Sibelius Hall	Fuga	(Note: K. Kiviniemi–Fuga (FUGA–9339) 2012)
18	Anders Eidsten Dahl	7:04	5:46	—N/a	—N/a	—N/a	—N/a	c. 2013	Bragernes Church	LAWO Classics	(Note: A. Dahl–LAWO Classics (LWC1050) 2013)
19	Ville Urponen	6:00	5:41	—N/a	—N/a	—N/a	—N/a	c. 2015	?	Fuga	(Note: V. Urponen–Fuga (FUGA–9399) 2015)
20	Kalevi Kiviniemi (3)	6:42	5:13	—N/a	—N/a	—N/a	—N/a	c. 2017	?	Fuga	(Note: K. Kiviniemi–Fuga (FUGA–9435) 2017)

== Notes, references, and sources ==
Notes

Sources

- Barnett, Andrew (2011). "Volume 13: Miscellaneous Works". The Sibelius Edition (CD booklet). Andrew Barnett (project advisor). BIS. BIS–CD–1936/38.
- Dahlström, Fabian [in Finnish] (2003). Jean Sibelius: Thematisch-bibliographisches Verzeichnis seiner Werke [Jean Sibelius: A Thematic Bibliographic Index of His Works] (in German). Wiesbaden: Breitkopf & Härtel. ISBN 3-7651-0333-0.
