= Laila Pullinen =

Finnish sculptor and visual artist (1933–2015)

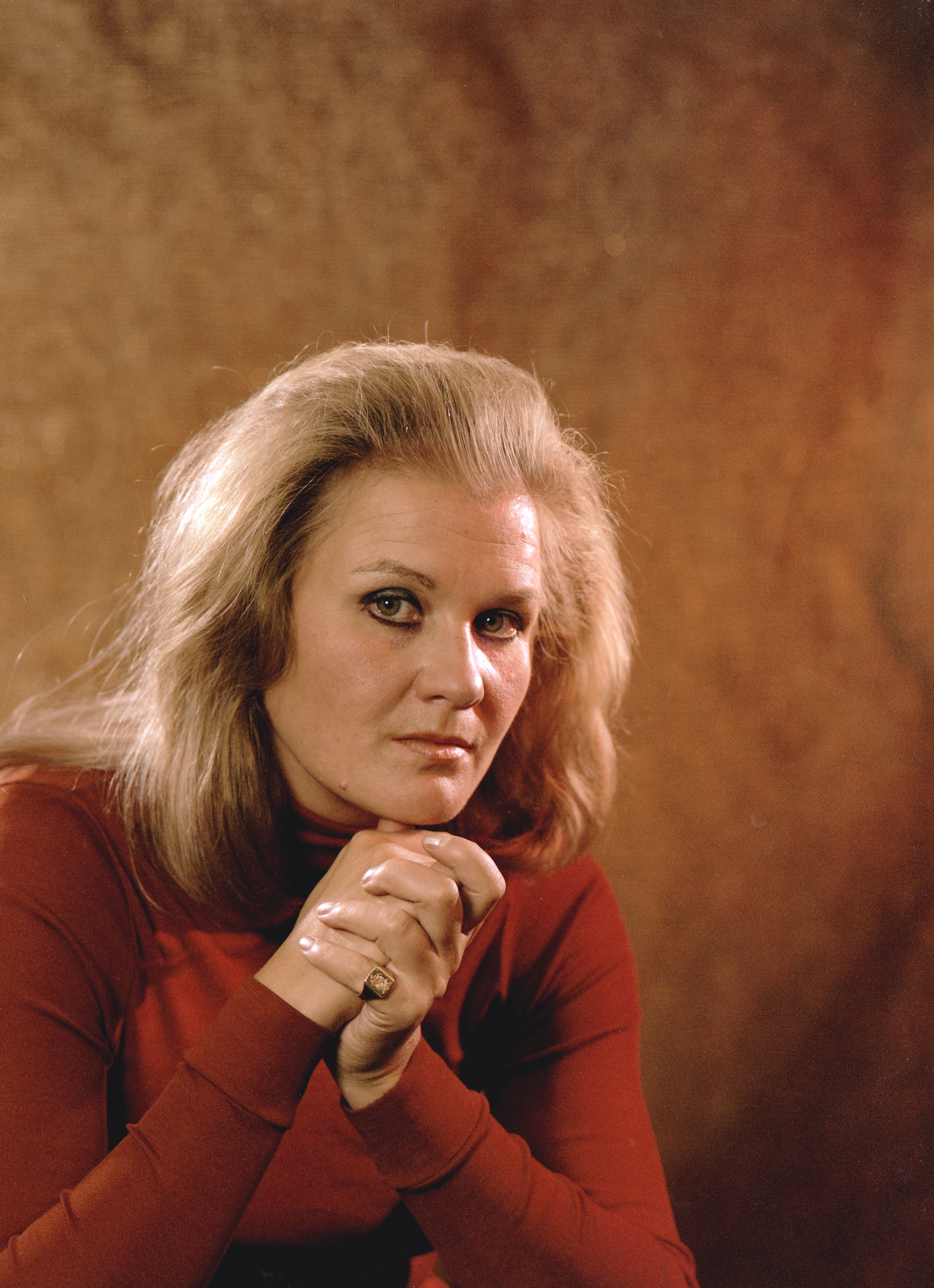
- Laila Pullinen with her Auringonkukka sculpture in 1966.
- Born: Laila Annikki Pullinen; 21 July 1933; Terijoki, Finland
- Died: 4 November 2015 (aged 82); Helsinki, Finland
- Known for: Sculpture
- Spouse: Carl Magnus Ramsay (m. 1971)

Laila Annikki Pullinen-Ramsay (21 July 1933 in Terijoki – 4 November 2015 in Helsinki) was a Finnish artist and sculptor. Her work exemplifies modernism, in particular classical modernism in sculpture. She was one of the few Finnish women artists to achieve international recognition.

== Background ==
Pullinen studied art first in Academy of Fine Arts, Helsinki 1953–1956, the Accademia Pietro Vannucci in Perugia 1958 and Accademia di Belle Arti di Roma 1961–1962. She started to exhibit her works in international exhibitions from the late 1950s. In Finland several dozens examples of her sculpture can be found decorating public places such as Helsinki-Vantaa Airport and Nissbacka Park of Sculpture. Her works have also been acquired by several international art museums and collections. In 1968 she was awarded Order of the Lion of Finland. She was also the first female president of the Union of Finnish Sculptors.

In her art Pullinen often employed traditional materials, such as stone and bronze, but occasionally she could try very innovative sculpting methods. For example, she used explosives to sculpt a relief for The 1967 International and Universal Exposition in Montreal, Quebec, Canada. As a personality she was known as a strong-willed and communal character, as she was a well-known figure in artist circles and worked to improve the position of sculptors.
