= Equestrian statue of Marshal Mannerheim =

Statue by Aimo Tukiainen

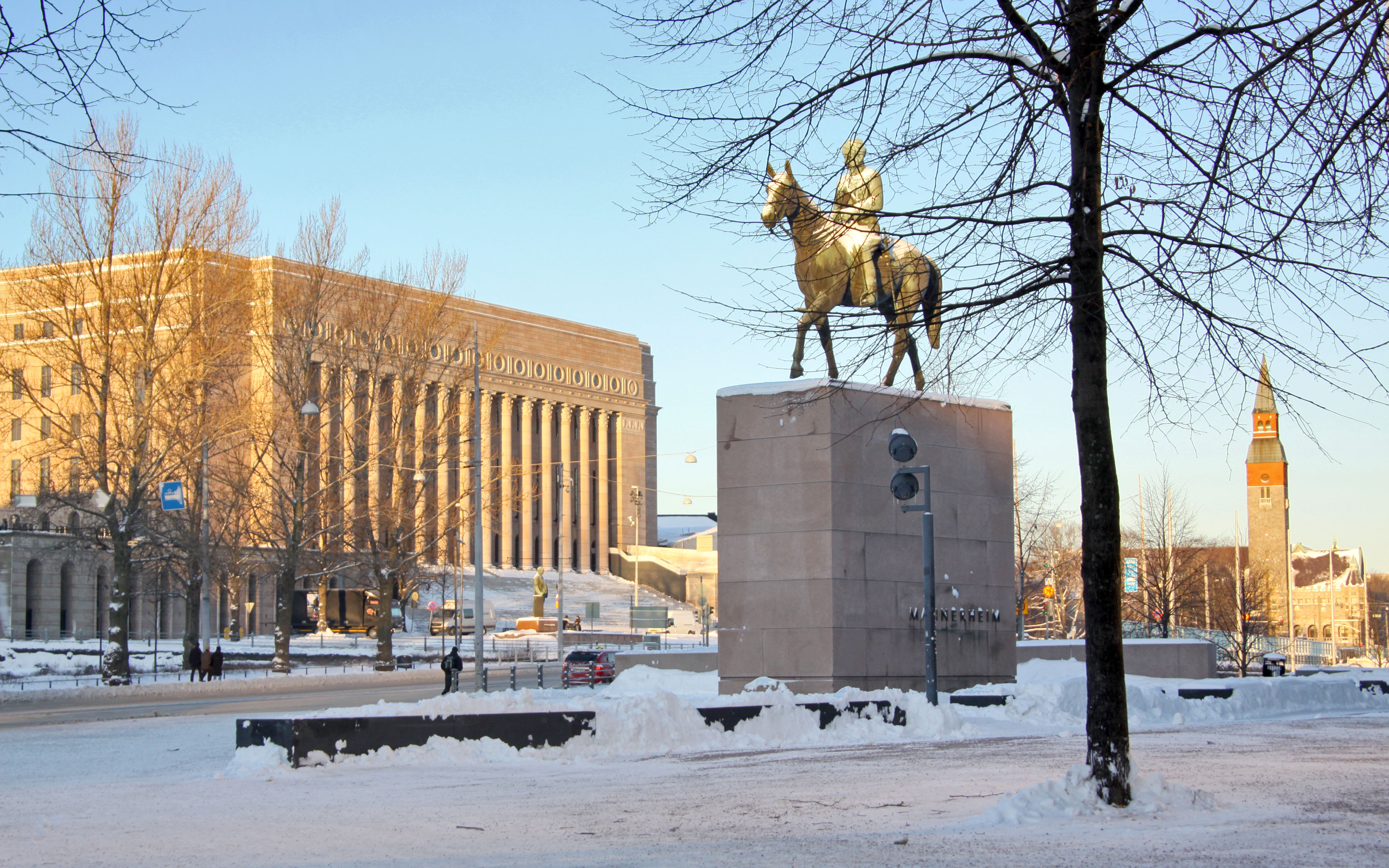
- The statue viewed from the south, with the House of Parliament and the National Museum in the background
- Year: 1960
- Location: Helsinki, Finland; 60°10′18″N 24°56′11″E

A bronze equestrian statue of Field Marshal Gustaf Mannerheim stands in the centre of Helsinki, Finland. It was made by Aimo Tukiainen and erected in 1960.

The bronze statue is 5.4 metres (18 ft) tall. It is raised on a granite plinth, 6.3 metres (21 ft) tall, 6.3 m long and 2.72 metres (8 ft 11 in) m wide.

As a general, Mannerheim had been a symbolic figure in Finland since the Finnish Civil War in 1918, and his position grew stronger during the Second World War as a field marshal. The first plans and fundraising for an equestrian statue started in 1937. After his death in 1951, the plans were relaunched by initiative of the Helsinki University Students' Union. During the fundraising campaign 737,503 members of the public donated over 78 million marks in 1952. The funds were sufficient not only for the statue but also for purchasing the Louhisaari mansion in Askainen, Mannerheim's place of birth, which was turned into a museum.

The statue was commissioned from Aimo Tukiainen after a competition. Tukiainen made a realistic and detailed statue of the horse-riding Mannerheim. At its unveiling in 1960, the art world considered it outdated. In his contemporary works Tukiainen himself had already moved on from realism.

The features of the horse, its gait and which of the marshal's horses it actually represents have been discussed a lot. During his life Mannerheim owned several horses. Tukiainen studied Mannerheim's last horse Käthy when working on the statue, but it is not a portrait of her as such.

The construction of the Kiasma museum of contemporary art next to the statue was debated during the time of construction of the museum.
