= Eila Hiltunen =

Finnish sculptor (1922–2003)

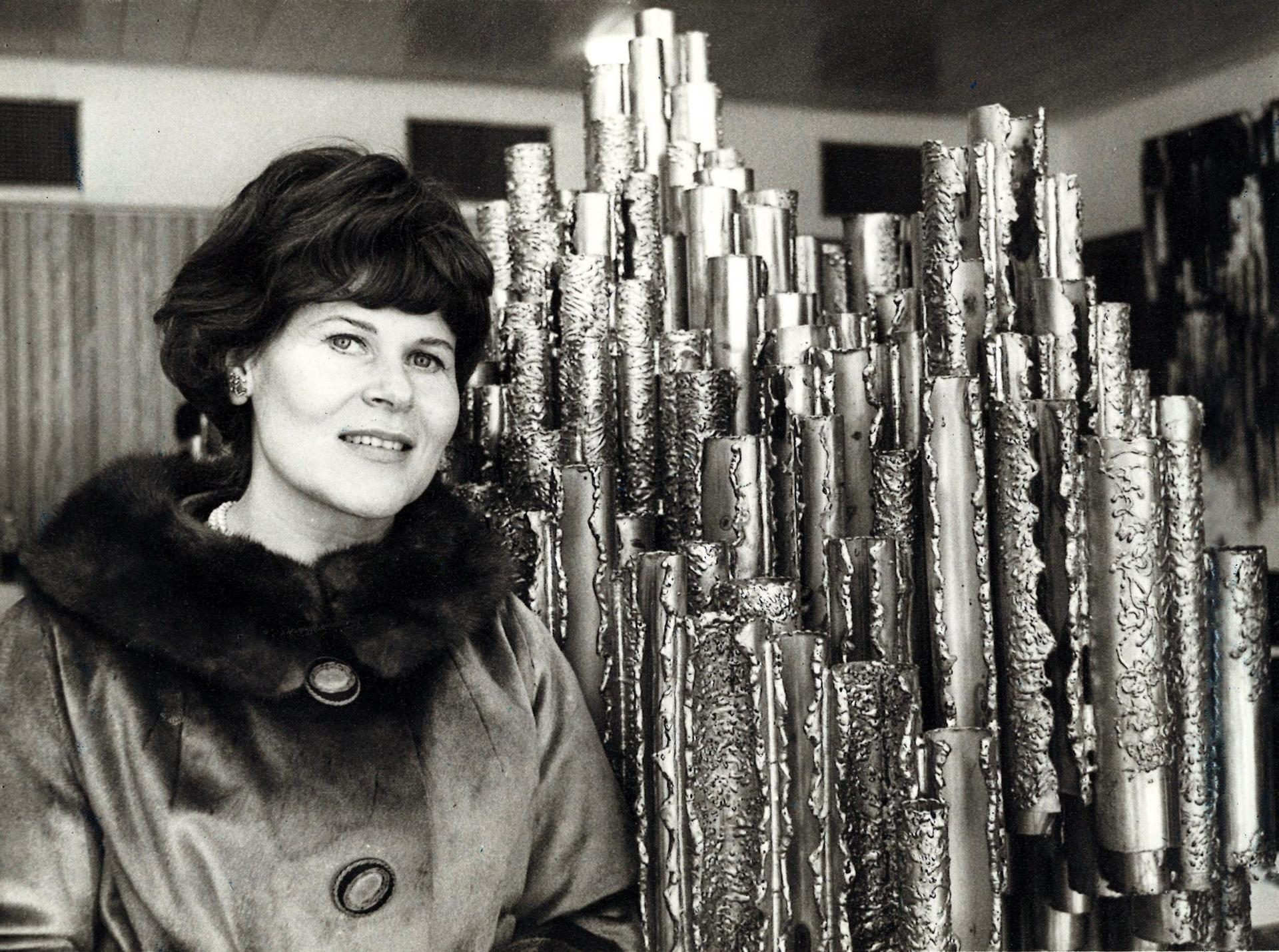
- Hiltunen with a miniature version of the Sibelius sculpture in 1965.
- Born: 22 November 1922; Sortavala, Finland
- Died: 10 November 2003 (aged 80); Helsinki
- Occupation: Sculptor
- Spouse: Otso Pietinen

Eila Vilhelmina Hiltunen (22 November 1922, Sortavala – 10 October 2003, Helsinki) was a Finnish sculptor. She is remembered above all for the Sibelius Monument (1967) in Helsinki. A smaller statue by Hiltunen resembling the Sibelius Monument stands on the grounds of the United Nations headquarters in New York City.

== Life ==
Hiltunen was born into a prosperous family in 1922. Her father invested in automobiles, and her mother was a strong supporter of her only child. The family's prospects changed dramatically during the economic crash of 1929, and her father took to drinking. He died in 1941, and it was her mother who brought her up. Hiltunen's artistic ambitions were empowered at the Finnish Art Academy, where she won the prize for sculpture twice.

She married in 1944 to photographer Otso Pietinen and had children. She and her sometimes-violent husband had a difficult relationship. She always used her birth name. Their marriage lasted 50 years until Otso Pietinen's death, although they were not always together.

Hiltunen is remembered above all for the Sibelius Monument, which was constructed in 1967. The sculpture won a competition organised by the Sibelius Society following the composer's death in 1957. It is one of the most popular tourist sites in Helsinki.

Although her abstract sculpture of pipes is now well regarded as an important Finnish landmark, its initial reception was controversial. The objection centered on the abstract design; although the design looked like stylised organ pipes, it was known that the composer had created little music for organs. To address her critics' concern, she was required to add Sibelius's face beside the main sculpture. A smaller sculpture by Hiltunen resembling the Sibelius Monument stands in the grounds of the United Nations headquarters in New York City.

Hiltunen was awarded the Finland Prize in 2000. Her husband, Otso Pietinen, died in 1993, and Hiltunen died in 2003.

In 2022, a major retrospective of Hiltunen's works was held at the Didrichsen Art Museum in Helsinki to mark the 100th anniversary of her birth.
