= Four Pieces, Op. 115 (Sibelius) =

Four duos for violin and piano by Jean Sibelius (1929)

Four Pieces
- Duos by Jean Sibelius
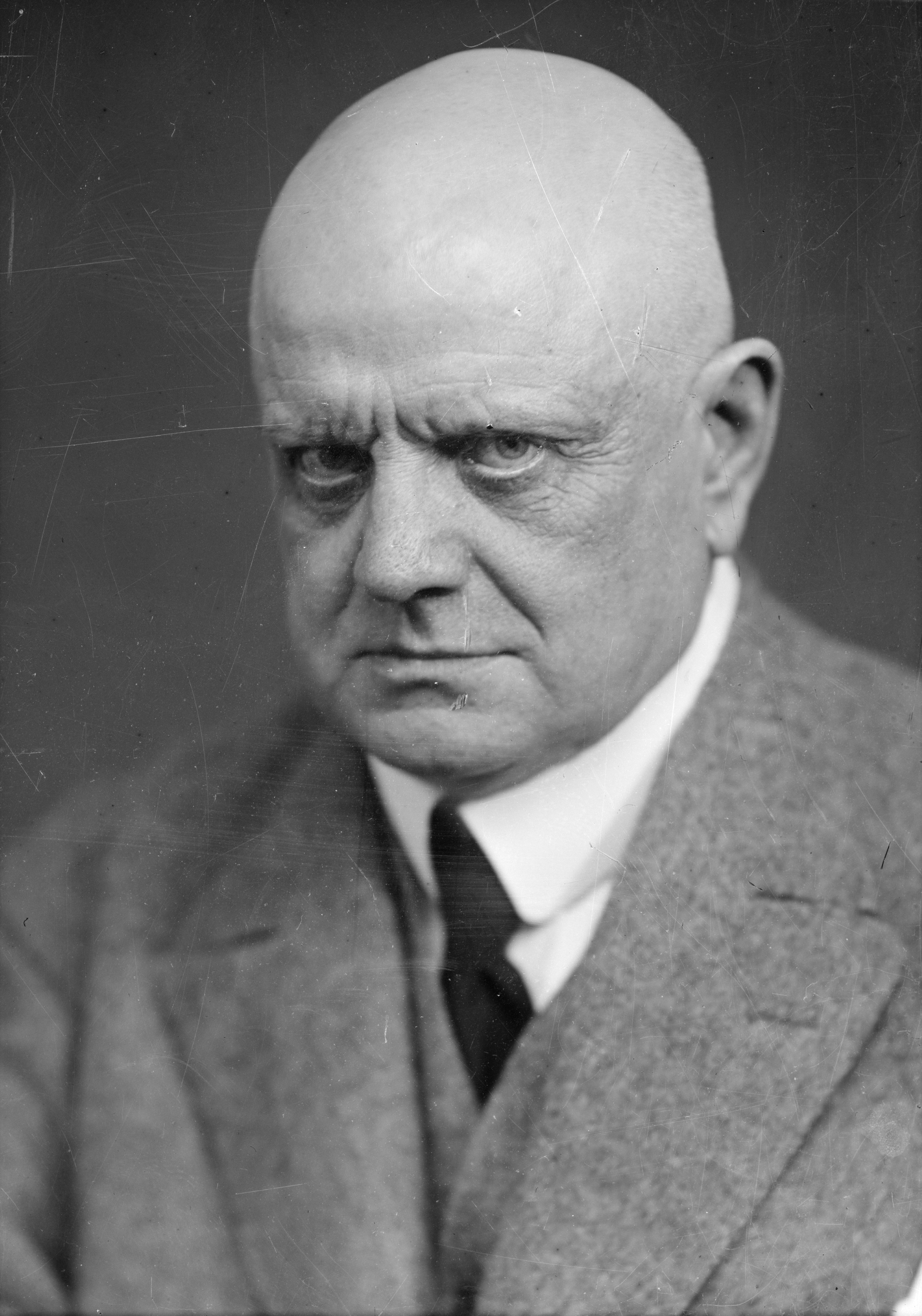
- The composer (c. 1927)
- Opus: 115
- Composed: 1929
- Publisher: Breitkopf & Härtel (1930)
- Duration: 10 mins
- Movements: 4

The Four Pieces (in German: Vier Stücke), Op. 115, is a collection of four duos for violin and piano written in 1929 by the Finnish composer Jean Sibelius. They were published as a set in 1930 by the German firm Breitkopf & Härtel. Along with the standalone Novellette (Op. 102, 1922), the Danses champêtre (Op. 106, 1924–1925), and the Three Pieces (Op. 116, 1929), Sibelius's Op. 115 is among his late-career, mature works in the genre.

== Structure ==
The following numbers comprise the Four Pieces:

1. On the Heath (Auf der Heide). Andantino.
2. Ballad (Ballade). Allegro moderato
3. Humoresque. Tranquillo
4. The Bells (Die Glocken). Presto

== Discography ==
The sortable table below lists commercially available recordings of the complete Four Pieces:

No.	Violinist	Pianist	Runtimes (Note: All runtimes are official, as printed on CD or LP liner notes.)					Rec. (Note: Refers to the year in which the performers recorded the work; this may not be the same as the year in which the recording was first released to the general public.)	Recording venue	Label	Ref.
No.	Violinist	Pianist	Op. 115/1	Op. 115/2	Op. 115/3	Op. 115/4	Total	Rec.	Recording venue	Label	Ref.
1	Ruggiero Ricci	Sylvia Rabinof	2:13	3:11	2:13	1:25	9:02	1979	St. Andrews Church, Toronto	Masters of the Bow	(Note: R. Ricci & S. Rabinof–Masters of the Bow (MBS 2009) 1979)
2	Yoshiko Arai	Eero Heinonen	2:25	3:36	2:52	1:28	10:36	1990	Martinus Culture Hall	Ondine	(Note: Y. Arai & E. Heinonen–Ondine (ODE 756–2) 1991)
3	Nils-Erik Sparf	Bengt Forsberg	2:21	3:54	2:15	1:20	10:05	1993	Danderyds gymnasium	BIS	(Note: N. Sparf & B. Forsberg–BIS (CD–625) 1994)
4	Kaija Saarikettu	Hui-Ying Liu	2:23	3:44	2:10	1:19	9:36	1995	Järvenpää Hall	Finlandia	(Note: K. Saarikettu & H. Liu–Finlandia (0630–17696–2) 1997)
5	Pekka Kuusisto	Heini Kärkkäinen	3:00	4:07	2:51	1:09	11:04	2004	Ainola	Ondine	(Note: P. Kuusisto & H. Kärkkäinen–Ondine (ODE 1046–2) 2004)
6	Fenella Humphreys	Joseph Tong	2:20	3:52	2:32	1:21	10:05	2020	Cedars Hall	Resonus Classics	(Note: F. Humphreys & J. Tong–Resonus Classics (RES10294) 2022)

== Notes, references, and sources ==
Notes

Sources

- Barnett, Andrew (2007). Sibelius. New Haven: Yale University Press. ISBN 978-0-300-11159-0.
- Dahlström, Fabian [in Swedish] (2003). Jean Sibelius: Thematisch-bibliographisches Verzeichnis seiner Werke [Jean Sibelius: A Thematic Bibliographic Index of His Works] (in German). Wiesbaden: Breitkopf & Härtel. ISBN 3-7651-0333-0.
