= Three Pieces, Op. 116 (Sibelius) =

Three duos for violin and piano by Jean Sibelius (1929)

Three Pieces
- Duos by Jean Sibelius
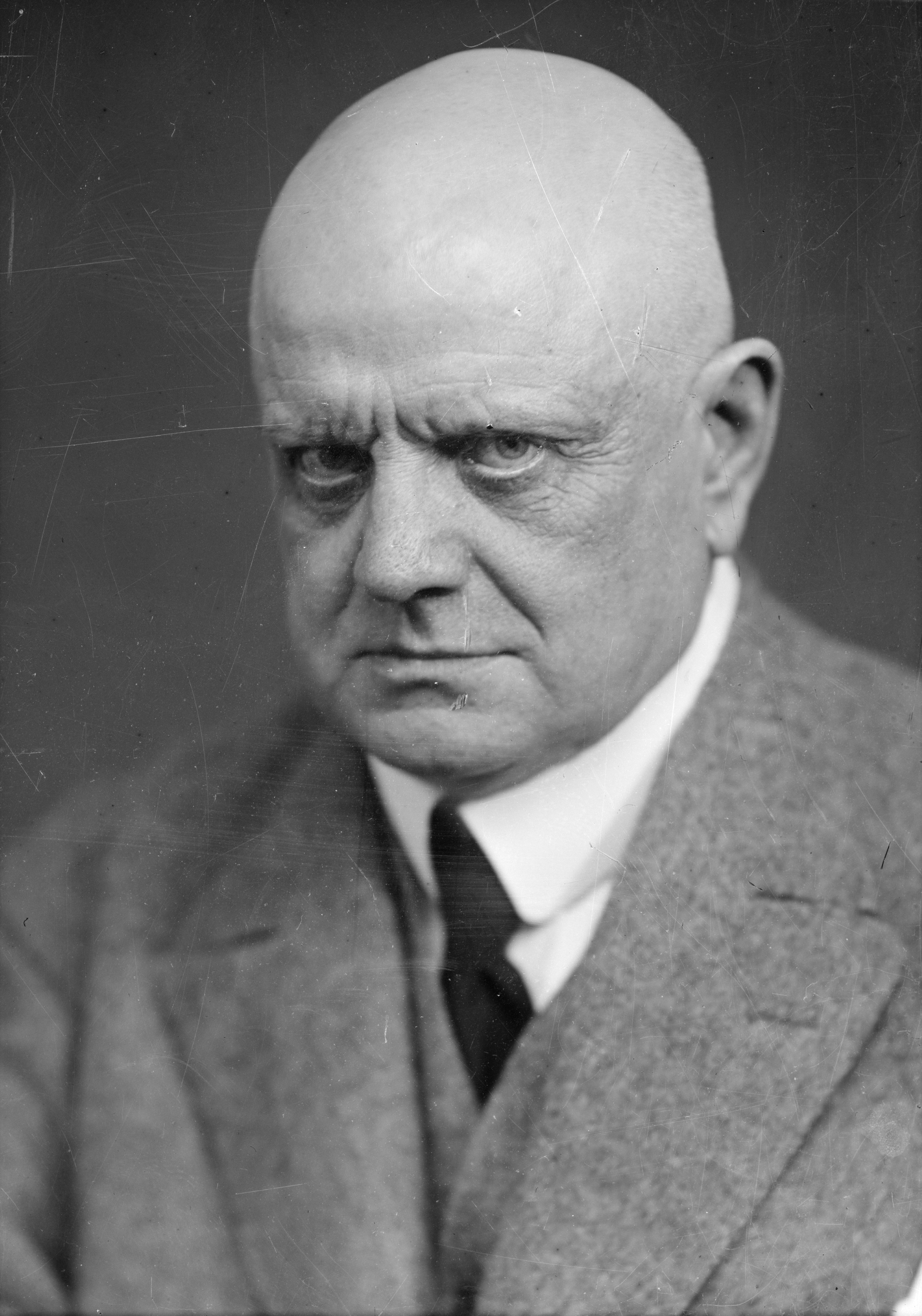
- The composer (c. 1927)
- Opus: 116
- Composed: 1929
- Publisher: Breitkopf & Härtel (1930)
- Duration: 8 mins
- Movements: 3

The Three Pieces (in German: Drei Stücke), Op. 116, is a collection of three duos for violin and piano written in 1929 by the Finnish composer Jean Sibelius. They were published as a set in 1930 by the German firm Breitkopf & Härtel. Along with the standalone Novellette (Op. 102, 1922), the Danses champêtre (Op. 106, 1924–1925), and the Four Pieces (Op. 115, 1929), Sibelius's Op. 116 is among his late-career, mature works in the genre.

== Structure ==
The following numbers comprise the Three Pieces:

1. Scène de danse. Tempo moderato.
2. Danse caractéristique. Tempo moderato
3. Rondeau romantique. Largamente

== Discography ==
The sortable table below lists commercially available recordings of the complete Three Pieces:

No.	Violinist	Pianist	Runtimes (Note: All runtimes are official, as printed on CD or LP liner notes.)				Rec. (Note: Refers to the year in which the performers recorded the work; this may not be the same as the year in which the recording was first released to the general public.)	Recording venue	Label	Ref.
No.	Violinist	Pianist	Op. 116/1	Op. 116/2	Op. 116/3	Total	Rec.	Recording venue	Label	Ref.
1	Ruggiero Ricci	Sylvia Rabinof	1:42	2:46	2:13	6:41	1979	St. Andrews Church, Toronto	Masters of the Bow	(Note: R. Ricci & S. Rabinof–Masters of the Bow (MBS 2009) 1979)
2	Yoshiko Arai	Eero Heinonen	2:06	2:43	3:22	8:21	1990	Martinus Culture Hall	Ondine	(Note: Y. Arai & E. Heinonen–Ondine (ODE 756–2) 1991)
3	Nils-Erik Sparf	Bengt Forsberg	2:06	2:40	4:20	9:19	1993	Danderyds gymnasium	BIS	(Note: N. Sparf & B. Forsberg–BIS (CD–625) 1994)
4	Kaija Saarikettu	Hui-Ying Liu	2:19	2:52	3:30	8:41	1995	Järvenpää Hall	Finlandia	(Note: K. Saarikettu & H. Liu–Finlandia (0630–17696–2) 1997)
5	Pekka Kuusisto	Heini Kärkkäinen	2:18	2:40	2:49	7:46	2004	Ainola	Ondine	(Note: P. Kuusisto & H. Kärkkäinen–Ondine (ODE 1046–2) 2004)
6	Fenella Humphreys	Joseph Tong	2:23	2:46	3:14	8:23	2020	Cedars Hall	Resonus Classics	(Note: F. Humphreys & J. Tong–Resonus Classics (RES10294) 2022)

== Notes, references, and sources ==
Notes

Sources

- Barnett, Andrew (2007). Sibelius. New Haven: Yale University Press. ISBN 978-0-300-11159-0.
- Dahlström, Fabian [in Swedish] (2003). Jean Sibelius: Thematisch-bibliographisches Verzeichnis seiner Werke [Jean Sibelius: A Thematic Bibliographic Index of His Works] (in German). Wiesbaden: Breitkopf & Härtel. ISBN 3-7651-0333-0.
