= Danses champêtre =

Five duos for violin and piano by Jean Sibelius (1924–1925)

- Duos by Jean Sibelius
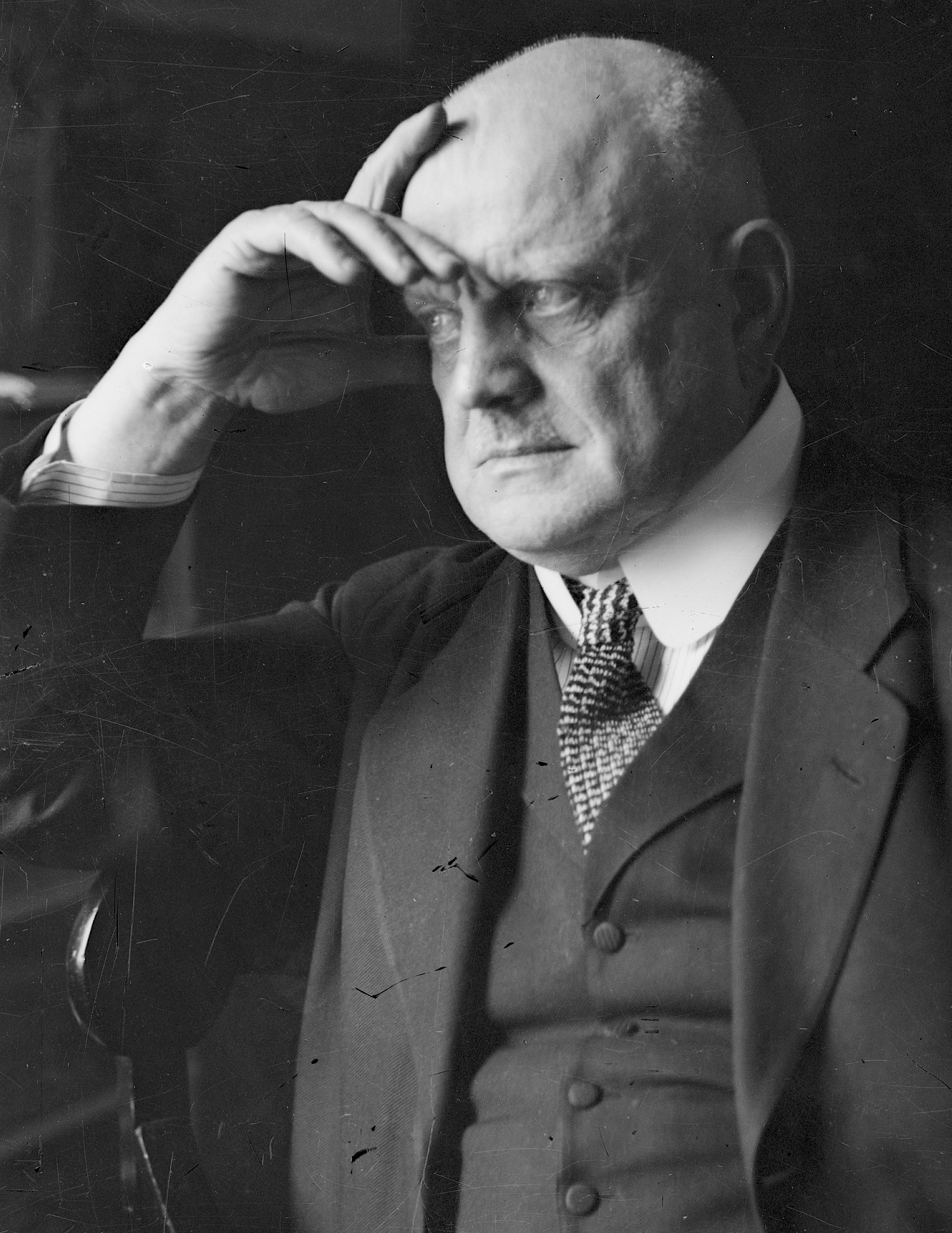
- The composer (c. 1925)
- Opus: 106
- Composed: 1924–1925
- Publisher: Fischer (1926)
- Duration: 18.5 mins
- Movements: 5

The Danses champêtre (literal English translation: "Country Dances"), Op. 106, is a collection of five duos for violin and piano written in 1924 and 1925 by the Finnish composer Jean Sibelius. The pieces are without descriptive names and, as such, are known by their tempo markings. They were published as a set in 1926 by the American firm Carl Fischer Music. Along with the standalone Novellette (Op. 102, 1922), the Four Pieces (Op. 115, 1929), and the Three Pieces (Op. 116, 1929), Sibelius's Op. 106 is among his late-career, mature works in the genre.

== Structure ==
The following numbers comprise the Danses champêtre:

1. Largamente assai
2. Alla polacca
3. Tempo moderato
4. Tempo di Menuetto
5. Poco moderato

== Discography ==
The sortable table below lists commercially available recordings of the complete Danses champêtre:

No.	Violinist	Pianist	Runtimes (Note: All runtimes are official, as printed on CD or LP liner notes.)						Rec. (Note: Refers to the year in which the performers recorded the work; this may not be the same as the year in which the recording was first released to the general public.)	Recording venue	Label	Ref.
No.	Violinist	Pianist	Op. 106/1	Op. 106/2	Op. 106/3	Op. 106/4	Op. 106/5	Total	Rec.	Recording venue	Label	Ref.
1	Ruggiero Ricci	Sylvia Rabinof	4:15	2:02	3:43	2:55	2:31	15:26	1979	St. Andrews Church, Toronto	Masters of the Bow	(Note: R. Ricci & S. Rabinof–Masters of the Bow (MBS 2009) 1979)
2	Yoshiko Arai	Eero Heinonen	4:26	2:21	4:29	3:20	3:18	18:15	1990	Martinus Culture Hall	Ondine	(Note: Y. Arai & E. Heinonen–Ondine (ODE 756–2) 1991)
3	Nils-Erik Sparf	Bengt Forsberg	5:02	2:25	4:19	3:19	3:11	18:37	1993	Danderyds gymnasium	BIS	(Note: N. Sparf & B. Forsberg–BIS (CD–625) 1994)
4	Kaija Saarikettu	Hui-Ying Liu	4:34	2:21	4:48	3:29	3:11	18:23	1995	Järvenpää Hall	Finlandia	(Note: K. Saarikettu & H. Liu–Finlandia (0630–17696–2) 1997)
5	Pekka Kuusisto	Heini Kärkkäinen	4:44	2:29	4:35	3:04	3:11	18:01	2004	Ainola	Ondine	(Note: P. Kuusisto & H. Kärkkäinen–Ondine (ODE 1046–2) 2004)
6	Ragnhild Hemsing	Tor Espen Aspaas	4:23	2:14	4:07	3:14	2:54	16:52	2016	Sofienberg Church	2L	(Note: R. Hemsing & T. Aspaas–2L (2L–138–SABD) 2017)
7	Carlos Damas	Anna Tomasik	3:59	2:05	3:42	3:12	3:05	16:03	c. 2016	?	Etcetera	(Note: C. Damas & A. Tomasik–Etcetera (KTC1564) 2016)
8	Fenella Humphreys	Joseph Tong	4:46	2:23	4:33	3:32	3:25	18:39	2020	Cedars Hall	Resonus Classics	(Note: F. Humphreys & J. Tong–Resonus Classics (RES10294) 2022)

== Notes, references, and sources ==
Notes

Sources

- Barnett, Andrew (2007). Sibelius. New Haven: Yale University Press. ISBN 978-0-300-11159-0.
- Dahlström, Fabian [in Swedish] (2003). Jean Sibelius: Thematisch-bibliographisches Verzeichnis seiner Werke [Jean Sibelius: A Thematic Bibliographic Index of His Works] (in German). Wiesbaden: Breitkopf & Härtel. ISBN 3-7651-0333-0.
