= Novellette (Sibelius) =

Duo for violin and piano by Jean Sibelius (1922)

- Duo by Jean Sibelius
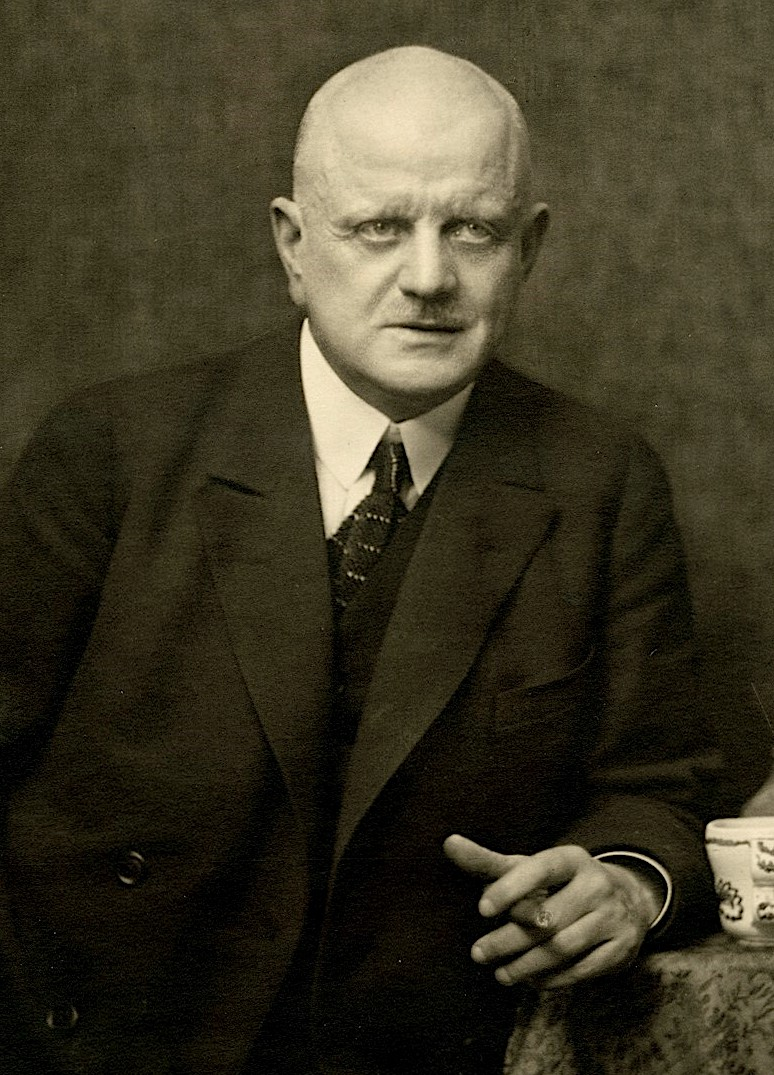
- The composer (c. 1923)
- Opus: 102
- Composed: 1922
- Publisher: Hansen (1923)
- Duration: 2.5 mins

Novellette, Op. 102, is a standalone duo for violin and piano written in 1922 by the Finnish composer Jean Sibelius. It was published in 1923 by the Danish firm Edition Wilhelm Hansen. (At the time, Sibelius had planned to write a new series of pieces for violin and piano. However, he ended up only composing one piece; this explains why Hansen's first edition of Novellette gives its catalogue number as "Op. 102, Nr. 1".) Along with the Danses champêtre (Op. 106, 1924–1925), the Four Pieces (Op. 115, 1929), and the Three Pieces (Op. 116, 1929), Sibelius's Novellette is among his late-career, mature works in the genre.

A short miniature, Novellette takes about two-and-a-half to three minutes to play. It is in the key of E minor and has a 6/4 time signature; its tempo marking is Allegro.

== Discography ==
The sortable table below lists commercially available recordings of Novellette:

No.	Violinist	Pianist	Runtimes (Note: All runtimes are official, as printed on CD or LP liner notes.)	Rec. (Note: Refers to the year in which the performers recorded the work; this may not be the same as the year in which the recording was first released to the general public.)	Recording venue	Label	Ref.
1	Ruggiero Ricci	Sylvia Rabinof	3:02	1979	St. Andrews Church, Toronto	Masters of the Bow	(Note: R. Ricci & S. Rabinof–Masters of the Bow (MBS 2009) 1979)
2	Yoshiko Arai	Eero Heinonen	2:39	1990	Martinus Culture Hall	Ondine	(Note: Y. Arai & E. Heinonen–Ondine (ODE 756–2) 1991)
3	Nils-Erik Sparf	Bengt Forsberg	2:39	1993	Danderyds gymnasium	BIS	(Note: N. Sparf & B. Forsberg–BIS (CD–625) 1994)
4	Kaija Saarikettu	Hui-Ying Liu	2:49	1995	Järvenpää Hall	Finlandia	(Note: K. Saarikettu & H. Liu–Finlandia (0630–17696–2) 1997)

== Notes, references, and sources ==
Notes

Sources

- Barnett, Andrew (2007). Sibelius. New Haven: Yale University Press. ISBN 978-0-300-11159-0.
- Dahlström, Fabian [in Swedish] (2003). Jean Sibelius: Thematisch-bibliographisches Verzeichnis seiner Werke [Jean Sibelius: A Thematic Bibliographic Index of His Works] (in German). Wiesbaden: Breitkopf & Härtel. ISBN 3-7651-0333-0.
