= Violin Sonatina (Sibelius) =

Duo for violin and piano by Jean Sibelius (1915)

Violin Sonatina in E major
- Duo by Jean Sibelius
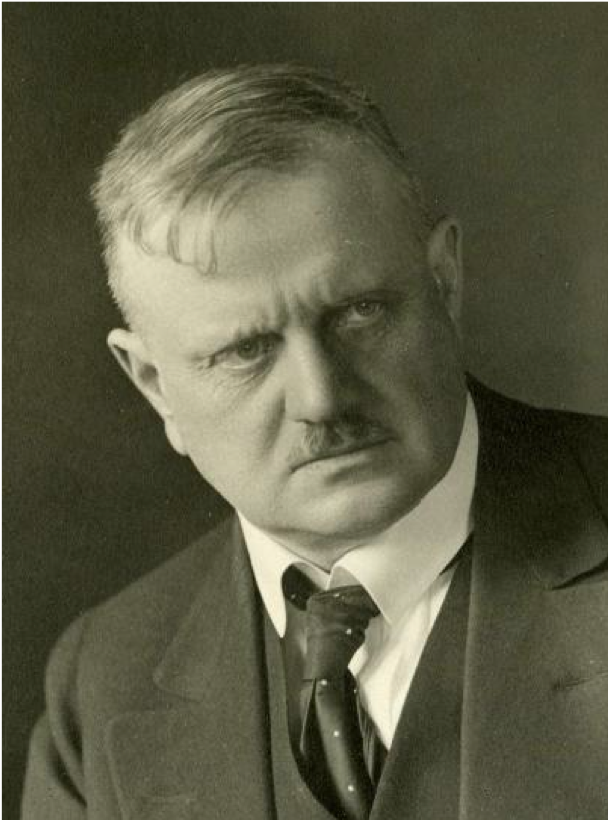
- The composer (c. 1915)
- Opus: 80
- Composed: 1915
- Publisher: Hansen (1921)
- Duration: 12.25 mins

Premiere
- Date: 6 December 1915
- Location: Helsinki, Grand Duchy of Finland
- Performers: Richard Burgin (violin); Eino Lindholm (piano)

The Violin Sonatina in E major, Op. 80, is a three-movement duo for violin and piano written in 1915 by the Finnish composer Jean Sibelius. The main theme of the third movement was originally intended for the Sixth Symphony (Op. 104).

== History ==
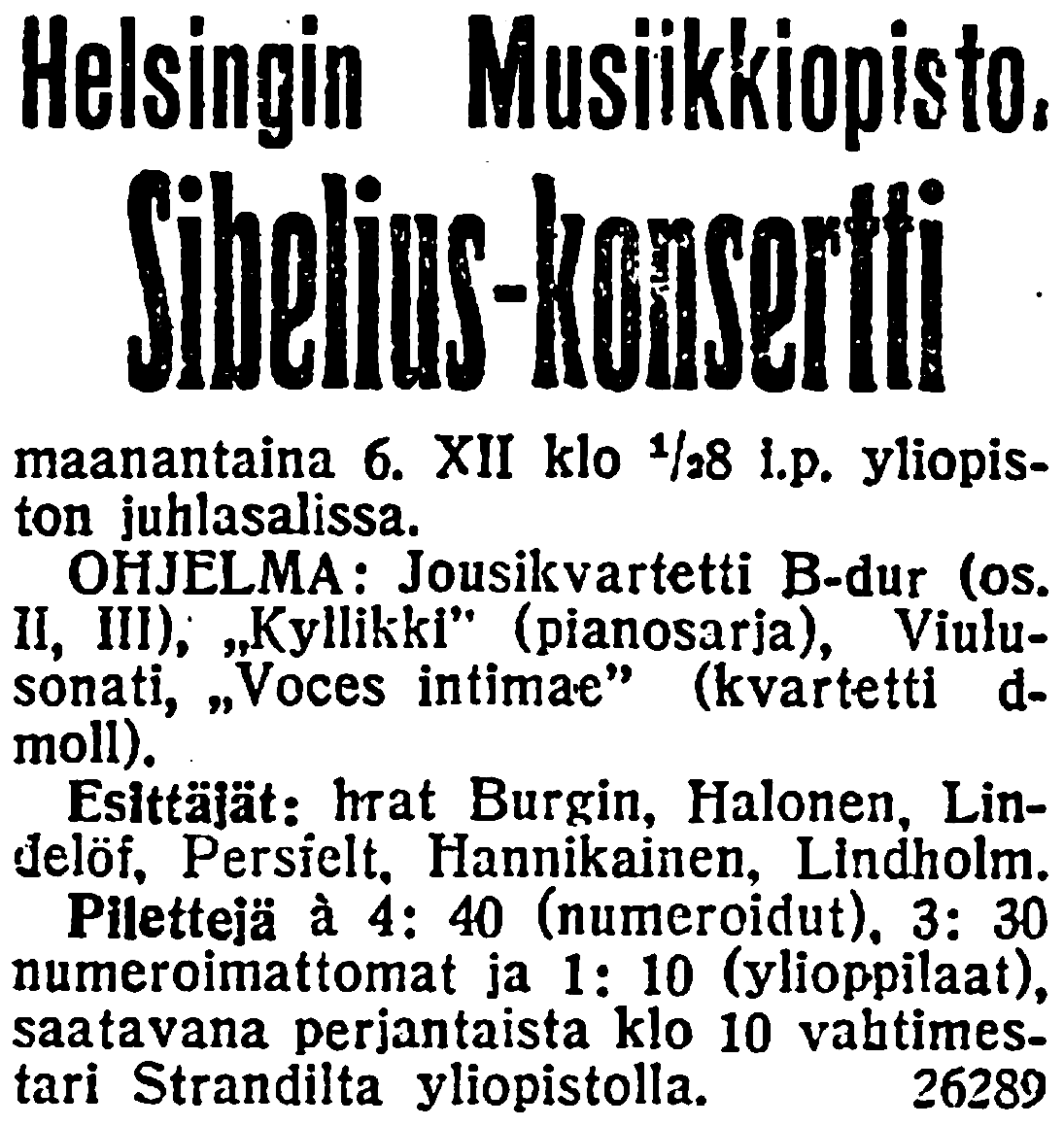
A 6 December 1915 advertisement promoting the premiere of Sibelius's Violin Sonatina

The Violin Sonatina received its premiere in Helsinki, Finland, on 6 December 1915, on the occasion of the semi-centennial of Sibelius's birth (during which there were many concerts celebrating the composer); the soloists were the Polish-American violinist Richard Burgin and the Finnish pianist Eino Lindholm. Also on the program was the String Quartet (Op. 4, 1890), the suite for solo piano Kyllikki (Op. 41, 1904), and the String Quartet, Voces intimae (Op. 56, 1909).

== Structure and music ==
The Violin Sonatina is in three movements, as follows:

1. Lento – Allegro
2. Andantino
3. Lento – Allegretto

The piece was published in 1921 by Edition Wilhelm Hansen.

The first movement begins in 4/4 time before switching to 2/2 for the Allegro. It has a duration of about 3 3/4 minutes.

The second movement is in 6/4 time and has a duration of about 4 1/2 minutes.

The third movement begins 4/4 time before switching to 2/4 at the Allegretto. It has a duration of about four minutes.

== Discography ==
The American violinist Diana Steiner and the pianist David Berfield made the world premiere studio recording of the Violin Sonatina in 1977 for Orion. The sortable table below lists this and other commercially available recordings:

No.	Violin	Piano	Runtime (Note: All runtimes are official, as printed on CD or LP liner notes.)	Rec. (Note: Refers to the year in which the performers recorded the work; this may not be the same as the year in which the recording was first released to the general public.)	Recording venue	Label	Ref.						
1	Violin	Piano	Runtime	Rec.	Recording venue	Label	Ref.	Diana Steiner	David Berfield	11:54	1977	Orion	(Note: D. Steiner & D. Berfield–Orion (ORS 76244) 1977)
2	Ruggiero Ricci	Sylvia Rabinof	10:22	1979	St. Andrew's Church	Masters of the Bow	(Note: R. Ricci & S. Rabinof–Masters of the Bow (MBS 2009–10) 1979)						
3	Yoshiko Arai (1)	Izumi Tateno	11:50	1980	Munkkivuoren kirkko	Finlandia	(Note: Y. Arai & I. Tateno–Finlandia (FA 322) 1981)						
4	Yoshiko Arai (2)	Eero Heinonen		1988	Kulttuuritalo Martinus	Ondine	(Note: Y. Arai & E. Heinonen–Ondine (ODE 720–2) 1988)						
5	Nils-Erik Sparf	Bengt Forsberg	12:51	1991	Danderyds gymnasium	BIS	(Note: N. Sparf & B. Forsberg–BIS (CD–525) 1991)						
6	Kaija Saarikettu	Teppo Koivisto	12:15	2001	Martti Talvela Hall, Mikaeli	Alba	(Note: K. Saarikettu & T. Koivisto–Alba (ABCD 167) 2001)						
7	Manfred Gräsbeck	Maija Lehtonen	14:23	2005	Tulinberg Hall, Oulun musiikkikeskus	Fuga	(Note: M. Gräsbeck & M. Lehtonen–Fuga (FUGA 9198) 2005)						
8	Carlos Damas	Anna Tomasik	11:34			Etcetera	(Note: C. Damas & A. Tomasik–Etcetera (KTC1564) 2016)						
9	Satu Jalas	Folke Gräsbeck		2014	Ainola	Ainola	(Note: S. Jalas & F. Gräsbeck–Ainola (AINOLA–01) 2015)						
10	Fenella Humphreys	Nicola Eimer	11:22	2016	Church of St John the Evangelist, Oxford	Stone	(Note: F. Humphreys & N. Eimer–Stone (5060192780826) 2018)						
11	Maxime Gulikers	Andrea Vasi				7 Mountain	(Note: M. Gulikers & A. Vasi–7 Mountain (7MNTN032DIG) 2021)						
12	Emma Arizza	Stefano Marzanni	13:34	2022	Palazzo Cigola-Martinoni, Cigole	Da Vinci Classics	(Note: E. Arizza & S. Marzanni–Da Vinci Classics (C00739) 2023)						

== Notes, references, and sources ==
Notes

Sources

- Barnett, Andrew (2007). Sibelius. New Haven: Yale University Press. ISBN 978-0-300-11159-0.
- Dahlström, Fabian [in Swedish] (2003). Jean Sibelius: Thematisch-bibliographisches Verzeichnis seiner Werke [Jean Sibelius: A Thematic Bibliographic Index of His Works] (in German). Wiesbaden: Breitkopf & Härtel. ISBN 3-7651-0333-0.
