= Uki =

Uki or UKI may refer to:

== Acronyms and abbreviations ==
- UKI Partnerships, now Brand Partners, a British insurance underwriters
- Ukiah Municipal Airport (IATA airport code), Mendocino County, California, U.S.
- Christian University of Indonesia (Universitas Kristen Indonesia), Jakarta
- Kui language (India) (ISO 639-3 code)

== Places ==
- Uki, New South Wales, Australia
- Uki, Kumamoto, Japan
- Uki Island, or Ugi Island, in the Solomon Islands

== People ==
=== Given name ===
- Uki Goñi (born 1953), Argentine writer, journalist and musician
- Uki Noah (born 1981), Indonesian guitarist
- Uki Ovaskainen (born 1975), Finnish pianist
- Uki Satake (born 1992), Japanese singer, actress, and radio host
- Uki Voutilainen (1922–2002), Finnish schoolteacher and politician

=== Surname ===
- Tetsuro Uki (born 1971), Japanese football manager and former player

== Other uses ==
- Uki (TV series), a 2010 Belgian animated children's programme
- UKI Arena, now Jessheim Stadion, a football stadium in Ullensaker, Norway
- HMAS Uki, a World War II Australian minesweeper
- UKI, a 2023 film by Shu Lea Cheang
- Uki Higashidani, a character in Rurouni Kenshin

== See also ==
- Uke (disambiguation)
