= Op. 80 =

In music, Op. 80 stands for Opus number 80. Compositions that are assigned this number include:

- Beethoven – Choral Fantasy (Beethoven)
- Brahms – Academic Festival Overture
- Dvořák – String Quartet No. 8
- Elgar – The Spirit of England
- Fauré – Pelléas et Mélisande
- Mendelssohn – String Quartet No. 6
- Prokofiev – Violin Sonata No. 1
- Reger – Zwölf Stücke, Op. 80
- Schumann – Piano Trio No. 2
- Sibelius – Violin Sonatina in E major, duo for violin and piano (1915)
- Strauss – Die schweigsame Frau
