= Mats Lidström =

Swedish musician (born 1959)

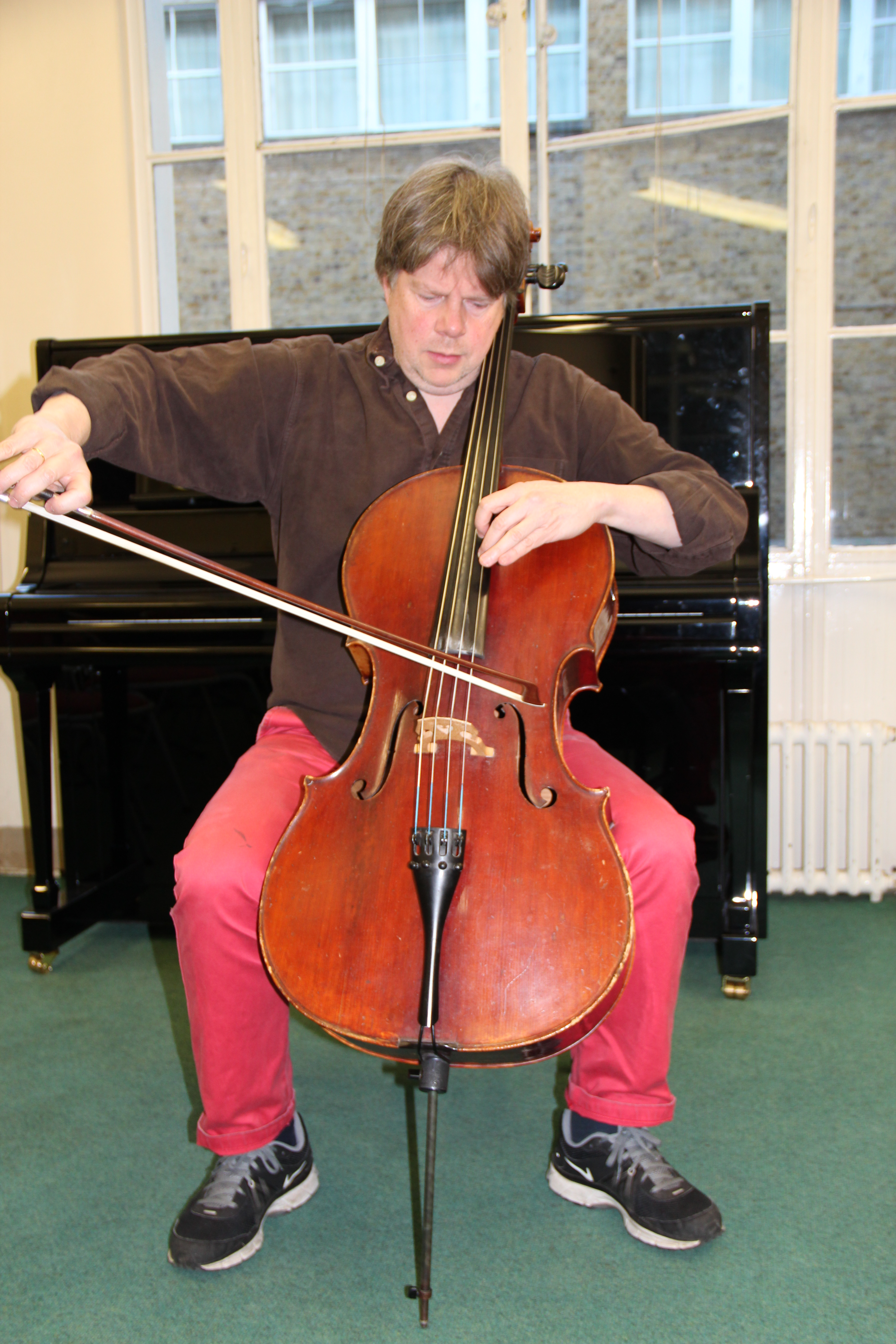
- Lidström in 2014
- Born: 1959 (age 65–66)
- Occupation(s): Solo cellist, recording artist, chamber musician, composer, teacher and publisher

Mats Lidström (born 1959) is a Swedish solo cellist, recording artist, chamber musician, composer, teacher and publisher.

His first teacher was Maja Vogl, of the music conservatory in Gothenburg. He then went on to study at the Juilliard School (New York) with Leonard Rose whose own teaching goes straight back to Luigi Boccherini (via Felix Salmond, Bernard Whitehouse, Alfredo Piatti and Gaetano Zanetti).

Lidström plays the "Grützmacher" Rocca (Giuseppe Rocca 1857).

== Career ==
=== In performance ===
Lidström has performed and recorded as a soloist with some of the world's major orchestras, including the London Symphony Orchestra, Royal Philharmonic Orchestra, the BBC Symphony Orchestra, the Deutsches Symphonie-Orchester Berlin, Czech Philharmonic and the Dallas Symphony, with conductors such as André Previn, Andrew Litton, Vladimir Ashkenazy, Maxim Shostakovich, Leif Segerstam, Osmo Vänskä, Franz Welser-Möst and Lü Jia.

He has worked as principal cellist with the Royal Philharmonic Orchestra, London Symphony Orchestra, The Philharmonia, Britten Sinfonia, Oxford Philharmonic Orchestra and St Martin-in-the-Fields of London, The BBC Scottish Symphony Orchestra and Royal Scottish National Orchestra, the Los Angeles Philharmonic, Oslo Philharmonic and Royal Concertgebouw orchestras, Bergen Philharmonie, Bournemouth Symphony Orchestra and the Royal Liverpool Philharmonic Orchestra, and the major symphony orchestras of Sweden.

Lidström gave the Scandinavian premiere of Korngold's Cello Concerto (1989) which was recorded for Swedish Radio Channel P2.

Lidström commissioned and gave the world premiere of Rolf Martinsson's first cello concerto on 20 April 2005 with the BBC Symphony Orchestra conducted by Mario Venzago.

In 1986 Lidström was invited to Moscow to play Dmitri Kabalevsky's Second Cello Concerto Op. 77 to the composer. Time was also spent with the composer in his home, sight-reading Lidström’s new Tango in C major. The concerto was later recorded on a CD and conducted by Vladimir Ashkenazy.

He has performed chamber music in many of the major halls, including Alice Tully Hall and the 92nd Street Y (New York City), Théâtre du Châtelet and Cité de la Musique (Paris), Musikverein (Vienna), Gulbenkian (Lisbon) and the Barbican, Wigmore, Cadogan, Queen Elizabeth and Royal Festival halls of London.

Lidström seeks out neglected but beautiful music for the cello and has produced several highly acclaimed and award-winning CDs. He appears on EMI, Deutsche Grammophon, Decca, BIS, Hyperion, Musica Sveciae, Opus 3, Caprice Records, as well as on his own label CelloLid.com.

Lidström has appeared on TV and radio throughout Europe, Japan, the U.S (including guest appearances on Andy Warhol's TV show Interiors) and South America.

He has performed at many festivals including Aspen, Kingston, Pensacola (USA), Cello Encounter (Rio de Janeiro) and across Europe, including the Netherlands, Italy, Poland, Bulgaria, Denmark, Spain and Sweden.

Lidström was the artistic director of the 2004/05 festival From Sweden in London, the greatest undertaking for Swedish classical music abroad by the Swedish government.

His ancestor on his father's side, Richard Dybeck, wrote the Swedish national anthem.

=== Teaching ===
Lidström was appointed professor at the Royal Academy of Music in London in 1993 (Honorary Associate in 1998).

Prior to the Royal Academy, he taught at the University of Gothenburg, Sweden.

He has given master classes at conservatories in San Francisco, Cleveland and Oberlin, as well as in Australia, Brazil, Spain, South America, Poland, Bulgaria, Denmark, the UK and Sweden.

=== Composer, publisher, arranger ===
==== Education publications ====
Lidström's compilation of orchestral excerpts for Boosey & Hawkes, The Orchestral Cellist, formed the basis for his publishing company CelloLid.com.

The Essential Warm-up Routine for Cellists gives practical guidance and daily warm-up exercises to support all facets of cello-playing.

The Beauty of Scale (made possible through a research grant from the Royal Academy of Music) explores the standard scales and contains chapters on alternative scales such as pizzicato, unisons, 4ths and 7ths, and also on how to practise scales.

==== For various instruments ====
Compositions include Rigoletto Fantasy for cello and orchestra on Verdi's opera, Interlude for string quartet and orchestra, Maze of Love for voice, piano and orchestra, Marche Triomphale for two pianos and percussion (GSO 2012 Commission), Carnival in Venice for violin and two cellos, René Descartes in Stockholm, for solo recorder, Christmas Cookies for mezzo-soprano and 3 cellos, Pigalle divertimento for two cellos.

==== For cello and piano ====
Suite Tintin – 9 scenes from The Adventures of Tintin. Premiered at the Wigmore Hall, London, March 2003 with Peter Jablonski.

Four sets of pieces for young players (Spooky Pieces, Traffic, Ballroom Dances and Hotel Suite), a concert suite (extract from his melodrama The Stamp King, premiered at the Wigmore Hall, London December 2010), Swedish Rhapsody (for Prime Minister Olof Palme, premiered at the Wigmore Hall December 2011), Sunflowers in the night and other love songs, and Le Cygne, in honour of Camille Saint-Saëns. See CelloLid.com.

In addition to his original compositions and transcriptions, Lidström has published an ongoing series called If Bach was a cellist, transcriptions and adaptations based on a fantasy that Bach intended everything he wrote for the cello.

Of the many transcriptions for cello as well as other instrumental combinations, composers include Rameau, Chopin, Schumann, Puccini, Debussy, Kreisler, Scriabin and Cole Porter. For his Suite de Pulcinella (cello and piano version of the 1949 orchestral score), Lidström has obtained a performance license from the Stravinsky estate.

==== Solo cello ====
- Suite for solo cello, dedicated to Leonard Rose (1977, revised 2001)
- Three pizzicato etudes
- My Heart Is In The East – Raoul Wallenberg In Memoriam for solo cello (performed at the centenary celebrations and at the Swedish parliament and members of the US congress, 2012).
- The Sea of Flowers Is Rising Higher, elegy for solo cello in memory of Diana, Princess of Wales. (September 1997)

== Selected recordings ==
=== On CD ===
- 1995 Kabalevsky Cello Concerto No. 2, Khachaturian Cello Concerto, Rachmaninov Vocalise, (with Vladimir Ashkenazy, conductor/pianist, Gothenburg Symphony Orchestra) BIS CD-719
- 1995 Boëllmann & Godard: Cello Sonatas CDA66888, (with Bengt Forsberg, piano)
- 1996 Swedish Cello Sonatas, (with Bengt Forsberg, piano) Caprice CAP 21460
- 1997 Koechlin & Pierné: Cello Sonatas, (with Bengt Forsberg, piano) Hyperion CDA66979 (awarded Diapason d'Or in 1998)
- 1997 Elgar and Groba Cello Concertos, (with Andrew Litton and The London Symphony Orchestra)
- 1999 Camille Saint-Saëns Cello Sonatas, Hyperion CDH55342 (with Bengt Forsberg, piano)
- 1999 Rendezvous with Korngold – Songs and Chamber music, (with Anne Sofie von Otter, mezzo soprano, Bengt Forsberg, piano, Kjell Lysell and Ulf Forsberg, violins and Nils-Erik Sparf, viola) Deutsche Grammophon DG 459 631-2
- 2000 French Cello Music, Hyperion/Helios CDA67244 (with Bengt Forsberg, piano)
- 2000 Smörgasbord Hyperion CDA67184, (with Bengt Forsberg, piano) (awarded BBC Pick of the Month) 'Unexpected pleasures' (BBC Music Magazine)
- 2001 Gunnar de Frumerie (includes Cello Concerto), (with Norrköping Symphony Orchestra conducted by Lü Jia) Caprice CAP 21644
- 2001 Dag Wirén (includes cello concerto), (with Sami Sinfonietta conducted by Stefan Solyom) Musica SVeciae PSCD 716
- 2004 Suite Tintin A tribute to Tintin. Incidental music is set to Tintin's journeys around the world. Bagpipes from Scotland, flutes from Tibet and Peru, and a soprano from a country never visited: Sweden. With George and Stuart McIlwham, Corin Long, Graham Mitchell, Richard Durrant, Susanna Andersson and Bengt Forsberg.
- 2013 Sergei Rachmaninov Piano Trios, Decca 0289 478 5346 6, with Vladimir Ashkenazy, piano, and Zsolt-Tihamér Visontay, volin "Ashkenazy, Visontay and Lidström tap the vein of grief coursing through this music, inspired . . . They also unleash passion"
- 2018 Shostakovich Cello Concerto no.1 and Lidström's "Rigoletto Fantasie" with the Oxford Philharmonic Orchestra and Vladimir Ashkenazy BIS

=== On DVD ===
- 2001 Erich Wolfgang Korngold – The Adventures of a Wunderkind. A Portrait and Concert, (Arthaus Musik 100362 (PAL), 100363 (NTSC))
- 2006 My Heart Is in the East and other pieces for solo cello (DVD, post-production)
- 2010 Brahms for Fuchs Sake (PAL DVD), Brahms sonatas for cello and piano in E minor and F major. Robert Fuchs Sonata for cello and piano in E flat, (with Bengt Forsberg, piano)
- 2010 The Swan and other short pieces for cello and piano (DVD, post-production)

== Publications ==
=== Educational ===
- The Orchestral Cellist, Boosey & Hawkes
- The Essential Warm-up Routine for Cellists, CelloLid.com CL116

=== Original compositions ===
- Le Cygne – The Swan, CelloLid.com CL113
- Hotel Suite for cello and piano, CelloLid.com CL103
- Portraits, CelloLid.com CL108
- Ballroom Dances, CelloLid.com CL104
- My Heart is in the East. Raoul Wallenberg in Memoriam (for solo cello), CelloLid.com CL115
- Spooky Pieces, CelloLid.com CL101
- Sun Flowers in the Night and other love songs for cello and piano, CelloLid.com CL118
- Traffic, CelloLid.com CL102
- Mother's Day & Father's Day – two gentle pieces for cello and piano, CelloLid.com CL119
- Tango, see CelloLid.com

=== Transcriptions ===
- If Bach was a cellist, Vol. 1 – Italian Concerto in F major BWV 971 for cello and piano, CelloLid.com CL100
- If Bach was a cellist, Vol. 2 – Cello Concerto in A major BWV 1055, CelloLid.com CL105
- If Bach was a cellist, Vol. 3 – 10 encores, CelloLid.com CL106
- If Bach was a cellist, Vol. 4 – Concerto for two cellos and orchestra (piano reduction) in D minor (Double Concerto) BWV 1043, CelloLid.com CL111
- If Bach was a cellist, Vol. 5 – Cello Concerto for two cellos and orchestra (piano reduction) in C minor, CelloLid.com CL114
- Vivaldi Concerto in A minor for 2 cellos and orchestra (piano reduction), CelloLid.com CL110
- Claude Debussy – La flûte de Pan (Syrinx) for Cello Solo, CelloLid.com CL112
- Jamaican Rumba and other pieces for cellos and piano, CelloLid.com CL109

=== Other works ===
- The Stamp King, (book, with artist Lars Paulsson) CelloLid.com CL107
