= Christopher Wright (composer) =

British music teacher and composer (1954–2024)

Christopher Wright (30 April 1954 – 4 December 2024) was a British music teacher and composer. He described the style of his own music as "largely tonal with atonal flavourings". Others have noted an English pastoral sensibility and the influence of William Walton.

== Life and career ==
Wright was born in Ipswich, Suffolk and began composing while still a teenager: his Kyson Point Suite for flute, oboe, violin and cello was performed at Ipswich Town Hall in 1971. He went on to study composition at the Colchester Institute with Richard Arnell and Alan Bullard. While in Colchester he also first made friends with fellow student and East Anglian composer Nicholas Barton. He took further composition lessons with Stanley Glasser at Goldsmiths College and with Nicholas Sackman at the University of Nottingham.

Initially Wright worked as a music teacher and a peripatetic brass teacher at various state and independent establishments, and as a trombonist, piano accompanist and choral trainer in local music activities. But in 1993 illness forced him to retire from teaching and he became a full-time composer. In the same year he married Ruth Dickins (1958–2009), a violinist who studied at the Guildhall School of Music. They settled in Woodbridge, Suffolk.

Ruth Wright died of cancer in 2009. Christopher Wright died of pneumonia on 4 December 2024, following a long decline resulting from dementia. His music has been recorded on the Cameo, Dutton Epoch, Divine Art/Metier, Lyrita, Merlin Classics and Toccata labels.

== Music ==
Wright's 2010 Violin Concerto was written in memory of his wife and recorded by Fenella Humphreys. He also composed an Oboe Concerto for Jonathan Small, a Horn Concerto for Richard Watkins and a Cello Concerto for Raphael Wallfisch. His four movement Symphony (2015) received its first performance at the English Music Festival, Dorchester on Thames, in 2018. Other compositions include much choral, chamber and instrumental music, including a series of works related to Suffolk - such as Orfordness for flute, violin, cello and piano, the Woodbridge Pieces for organ, and Four East Coast Sketches for harp. Likewise the orchestral piece The Lost City was inspired by Dunwich and the String Quartet No. 1 by Orford Ness. The four string quartets (all recorded by the Fejes Quartet) span the years 1978 to 2012.

== Selected works ==
- Music for Youth, brass quintet (1977)
- Patterns for brass band (1978),
- String Quartet No. 1 (1980)
- Armageddon for large orchestra and tape (1980)
- Concertino for violin, orchestra and piano (1985)
- Magnificat and Nunc Dimittis (1993)
- String Quartet No. 2 (1995)
- The Lost City for orchestra (1996)
- Orfordness for flute, violin, cello & piano (1997)
- Idyll for small orchestra (2000)
- In Memoriam for chorus, brass, timpani and strings (2001)
- Threnody for orchestra (2002)
- Woodbridge Pieces for organ (2002)
- Capriccio Burlesque for string orchestra (2003)
- Four East Coast Sketches for harp (2003)
- String Quartet No. 3 (2005)
- A Little Light Music: Suite for String Orchestra (2006)
- Searching for cor anglais and strings (2006)
- Spring Overture for orchestra (2007)
- Divertimento for treble recorder and strings (2008) (for John Turner)
- Momentum for orchestra (2008)
- Missa brevis (2009)
- Oboe Concerto (2009)
- Violin Concerto (2010)
- Horn Concerto (2011)
- Cello Concerto (2011)
- String Quartet No. 4 (2012) (Fejes Quartet commission)
- Legend for orchestra (2013) (English Music Festival commission)
