= Uke =

Uke or UKE may refer to:

== People ==
- Billy "Uke" Carpenter, American musician
- Billy "Uke" Scott (1923–2004), British musician
- Uke Clanton (1898–1960), American baseball player
- Ukë Rugova, Kosovar politician
- Sıtkı Üke (1876–1941), Turkish general and politician

== Places ==
- Uke Island, Japan
- Uke, Nigeria

== Ukrainians ==
- UKE: The Untold Story of Hockey Legends, 2020 Ukrainian film about Ukrainian National Hockey League players
- Uke, a.k.a. Ukrainian, a person identified with nationality of Ukraine

== Other uses ==
- Uke (martial arts), role in training
  - Uke, a submissive role in a relationship between males in yaoi or shōnen-ai media, derived from the martial arts term
- Ukulele, a musical instrument
  - Mighty Uke, a 2010 documentary film about the ukulele
- Üké, Uke, or Ükä Tibetan, a term for the most widely understood dialect of Tibetan languages
- Uke Mochi, a goddess of food in the Shinto religion of Japan
- University Medical Center Hamburg-Eppendorf or UKE, a hospital in Germany

== See also ==
- Uki (disambiguation)
