= Richard Watkins =

British conductor and horn player (born 1962)

Richard Watkins (born 1962) is a horn player. He performs as a concerto soloist and chamber music player. He was Principal Horn of the Philharmonia Orchestra from 1985 to 1996, a position he relinquished to devote more time to his solo career.

He has appeared as soloist in the Royal Festival Hall, at the Barbican Centre and abroad with conductors such as Carlo Maria Giulini, Wolfgang Sawallisch, Leonard Slatkin, Giuseppe Sinopoli, Andrew Davis and Gennadi Rozhdestvensky. He is in great demand as a chamber musician and recitalist and has worked closely with pianists such as Barry Douglas, Peter Donohoe, Pascal Rogé, Barry Scott and Martin Roscoe. He is a member of the Nash Ensemble.

His recordings include Sir Malcolm Arnold's two horn concertos for the Conifer Classics label, to great critical acclaim, and Mozart's Sinfonia Concertante with the Philharmonia and Giuseppe Sinopoli for Deutsche Grammophon; other recordings include the Mozart Horn Concertos with Richard Hickox for Pickwick and chamber music recordings, both as soloist and as a chamber musician, for a variety of labels. Recent releases include Glière's rarely performed Horn Concerto with Sir Edward Downes and the Concerto for Horn and Violin by Dame Ethel Smyth for Chandos. He has also played on popular rock band U2's latest album.

Richard Watkins is closely associated with promoting contemporary music for horn; Sir Peter Maxwell Davies wrote 'Sea Eagle' (solo horn) for him in 1983 and since then, Richard Watkins has given the world premiere of David Matthews' 'Capriccio' in a concert at the Wigmore Hall to commemorate Dennis Brain's 70th Anniversary and Nigel Osborne's 'The Sun of Venice' with the Philharmonia. Further projects included the premiere of Colin Matthews' Horn Concerto with Esa-Pekka Salonen at the Royal Festival Hall during the 2001 season and a Horn Concerto by Sir Peter Maxwell Davies. He recorded Michael Nyman's music for La Sept with the Michael Nyman Band in 1989. In June 2007, he was horn soloist in the first performance of Matthew King's epic forest piece, King's Wood Symphony. In 2022 Watkins recorded the Horn Concerto (2011) written for him by Christopher Wright.

Richard Watkins mainly teaches master classes both in the UK and abroad. At present, he is a guest teacher in the Royal College of Music and he is holder of the Dennis Brain Chair in the Royal Academy of Music.

He has two sons named Alexei and Louis. Alexei currently attends the Royal Academy of Music studying the horn. Louis is currently reading Music at St John's College, Cambridge and is also a Choral Scholar in the Choir of St John's College, Cambridge.
