= Brand Partners =

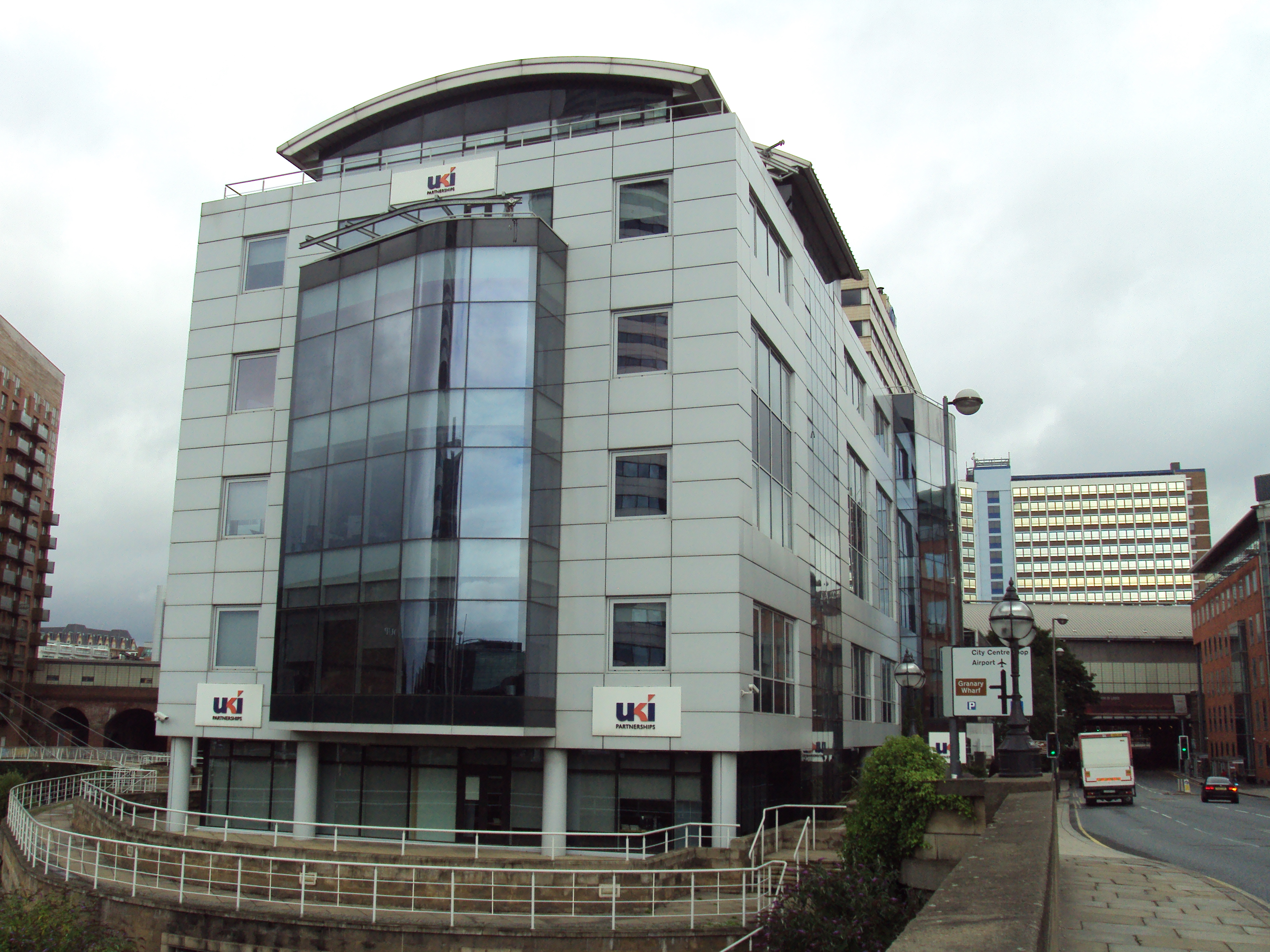
UKI Partnership offices in Leeds.

Brand Partners, formerly UKI Partnerships, is a partnership company and underwriters owned by the Direct Line Group.

It underwrites and administers policies for several different general insurance brands including RBS, Coutts, Lloyds TSB, Ulster Bank, Isle of Man Bank, Egg. It also administers products underwritten by other underwriters and has partnerships with many well known motor manufacturers such as BMW, Vauxhall, Peugeot.

In 2003, UKI was judged best in "customer service strategy" by Institute of Financial Services (IFS).
