= Uki Ovaskainen =

Finnish pianist

Uki Lauri Aleksi Ovaskainen (born 1975 in Espoo, Finland) is a Finnish pianist.

He is highly acclaimed both for his concentrated performances of the cornerstones of classical piano repertoire, as well as for his vast experience as a chamber musician, performing regularly with all string- and wind instruments, as well as with singers. American pianist and musicologist Charles Rosen wrote : "Uki Ovaskainen is the finest young talent I've heard in the past ten years. He combines real musical intelligence with a first rate technique and remarkable sensibility", while according to Pnina Salzman, pre-eminent Israeli pianist, pupil of Alfred Cortot "Uki Ovaskainen is a wonderful pianist. His playing is very lyrical and poetical. His interpretation of the various styles is always intelligent and in good taste".

Ovaskainen was awarded the first prize "Premio Jaen", "Premio musica contemporanea" for the best performance of the work commissioned by the competition, and the prize of the audience in the International piano competition "Premio Jaen" in Spain. He has performed as a piano soloist with orchestras such as Copenhagen Philharmonic and Orchestra of the Mariinsky Theatre in Saint Petersburg, with conductors including Michail Jurowski, Michel Tabachnik and Vladimír Válek. He has performed at numerous piano and chamber music festivals throughout Europe.

Ovaskainen studied in Finland at the Espoo music institute with Waldemar Hagert, (giving his first performance with a professional orchestra at the age of 12, playing the 2nd Piano concerto by Beethoven), and at the Sibelius-Academy (department for young talents, and department for soloists) with prof. Hui-Ying Liu-Tawaststjerna. From 1996 he studied with prof. Jose Ribera at the Royal Danish Conservatory of Music in Copenhagen, where he finished studies with the highest character 13, reserved for exceptional examinations in the Danish educational system. He continued studies with the same professor and finished the Soloist class in 2005 with a concert, drawing widespread interest and acclaims in the Danish newspapers. He also studied with prof. Matti Raekallio in the Soloist class of Hannover Hochschule für Musik. Besides his studies, Uki Ovaskainen has worked with pedagogues and artists such as Pnina Salzman, Yahli Wagman, Charles Rosen, Andras Schiff, Arbo Valdma and Emanuel Krasovsky.

Uki Ovaskainen played a series of eight recitals in 11 days at the Royal Danish Concervatory of Music, the first program being Goldberg-variations by J.S.Bach and Diabelli-variations by Beethoven, and the last one the three last Piano sonatas by Beethoven. Other programs included all Etudes by Chopin and Schumann-, Ravel- and Prokofiev recitals. It marked the biggest individual project in the history of the conservatory. Jan Jacoby wrote in Politiken: "Amazing talent. Each variation was throughout sensitively modulated inside its clearly defined basic colour, and a distinct singing conscious of all voices gave life to the polyphony, while the differentiated articulation was carried out without any hesitation. One was spellbound."
