= Cedars Hall =

Coordinates: 51.2133°N 2.6448°W

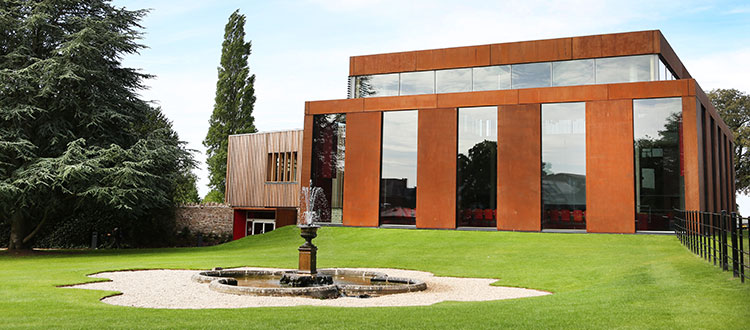
- Main entrance and fountain of Cedars Hall
- Interactive map of the Cedars Hall area

General information
- Type: Performing arts venue
- Location: Wells, Somerset, United Kingdom
- Inaugurated: 2016
- Owner: Wells Cathedral School

Design and construction
- Architect: Eric Parry
- Architecture firm: Eric Parry Architects
- Main contractor: Shaylor Group

Cedars Hall is Wells Cathedral School's performing arts venue located in Wells, Somerset, England. Opened in autumn 2016, it provides the capacity for audiences of 350 in its main recital hall named Eavis Hall after Old Wellensian Michael Eavis, CBE, founder of the Glastonbury Festival.

== Performance and practice spaces ==
Eavis Hall is a flexible and modern performance space accommodating an orchestra of 60 performers and an audience of 250, with other configurations possible through adaptation of seating and platforms. Whilst Cedars Hall's award-winning design was devised to give chamber musicians the very best acoustic experience, the flexibility of the technical specification means that this venue is accessible for performers of every discipline – for amplified music, dance, drama and lectures.

As well as the events venue, Eavis Hall, Cedars Hall offers space to the school's musicians, for teaching, rehearsing and performing. It also acts as a hub for wider participation and involvement by the local community, providing music education (including workshops, concerts and masterclasses) for young people, the elderly and for disability groups throughout South West England.

Cedars Hall includes three further teaching and practice spaces, each with adjoining observation facilities as well as the John Baxter Foyer, bar and recording facilities.

== Concerts and Events Programme ==
Cedars Hall has hosted a variety of musicians including jazz artists Clare Teal and Claire Martin, finger guitarist Mike Dawes and pianists Mitsuko Uchida and Stephen Hough. In addition to music, Cedars Hall has a varied programme, which includes lectures, art exhibitions, comedy shows and drama productions. Previous performances include Patricia Routledge, Simon Singh and Vikki Stone. BBC Radio 3 has broadcast two series of concerts from Cedars Hall: Towards the Revolution and Four Cities.

== Contractors ==
The building was designed by Eric Parry Architects, an award-winning practice based in London, UK. The theatre consultants, Charcoalblue, provided guidance on the planning of the recital space and assisted with stage engineering. BuroHappold Engineering, an engineering consultancy also assisted with the design of the hall. Construction was undertaken by the Shaylor Group.

== Awards ==
Cedars Hall has won two Royal Institute of British Architects (RIBA) awards; the South West Award 2017 and the South West Building of the Year Award 2017.
