= Hui-Ying Liu-Tawaststjerna =

Hui-Ying Liu-Tawaststjerna (劉慧瑛; born Taipei, 19 October 1950) is a Taiwan-born pianist resident in Finland.

She has been a lecturer on piano performance at Sibelius Academy since 1985. Uki Ovaskainen was among her students.
