= Fenella Humphreys =

British classical violinist

- Born: 1977 or 1978 (age 48–49); London, England
- Genres: Classical, Contemporary Classical
- Instrument: Violin
- Website: fenellahumphreys.com

Fenella Humphreys is a British classical violinist who specialises in classical and contemporary repertoire as both a soloist and chamber musician.

== Career and education ==
Born 1977 or 1978 (age 48–49), she studied under Sidney Griller, Itzhak Rashkovsky, Ida Bieler and David Takeno at the Purcell School, Guildhall School of Music and Drama, and the Robert-Schumann-Hochschule in Düsseldorf.

A number of eminent composers have written works for Humphreys, including Sir Peter Maxwell Davies, Sally Beamish, Cheryl Frances-Hoad, Gordon Crosse, Adrian Sutton, Christopher Wright and Piers Hellawell. She performs standard repertoire and contemporary violin concertos including Thomas Adès's Concentric Paths, Pēteris Vasks's Vientuļais eņģelis (Lonely Angel) and Max Richter's Recomposed: Vivaldi – The Four Seasons, which she recorded in 2019 for Rubicon Classics.

Her recording of Jean Sibelius's Violin Concerto and Six Humoresques with the BBC National Orchestra of Wales was released in 2021. In the same year, she released sheet music of a number of her own arrangements for violin that she performed during the Covid-19 lockdown.

In 2026, with Martin Roscoe, she released a new album, Moon Shadows, on the Chandos label.

Humphreys plays on a G.B. Guadagnini violin.

== Award ==
In 2018, Humphreys won the BBC Music Magazine Instrumental Award for her solo CD Bach 2 the Future, vol.II. In 2023, she went on to win the Premiere Award for her album Caprices. In 2024, she released the album Prism, featuring new works including her own arrangements and the first recording of a work found on Sir Peter Maxwell Davies' desk following his death, titled A Last Postcard from Sanday.
