= Benno and Sylvia Rabinof =

Benno and Sylvia Rabinof were a violin and piano duo. They extensively toured the U.S., Europe, Asia and Africa throughout their career together performing a mix of classical and contemporary pieces.

== Benno Rabinof ==
Benno Rabinof (1902–1975), a violinist, was the last of Leopold Auer's famous students, who also included Efrem Zimbalist, Mischa Elman, and Jascha Heifetz. In 1927, Benno made his Carnegie Hall debut playing the Elgar and Tchaikovsky concertos, with Auer conducting. Benno then performed throughout America and Europe, in solo recitals and with orchestras. In the late thirties and early forties, Benno played 28 different concertos in a series of 28 weekly WOR broadcasts under the baton of Alfred Wallenstein.

== Sylvia Rabinof ==
Sylvia Rabinof, a pianist, teacher, and composer, was born Sylvia Smith in New York on October 10, 1913. As a child and teenager, Sylvia attended the Third Street Music School Settlement, later continuing her piano studies with Paderewski, Simon Barere, and Rudolf Serkin. Sylvia made her European debut in Paris in 1937; and in 1938, she gave a recital at Town Hall in New York. Sylvia died in Florida on January 20, 2001.

== Rabinof collaborations and life after Benno ==
A week after Sylvia and Benno met, they got together for their first date, spending the day playing all 10 of Beethoven’s sonatas for violin and piano.

Benno and Sylvia married in 1943 and began concertizing around the world together, performing violin and piano sonatas, as well as appearing in solo recitals and as soloists with major orchestras. For their tenth wedding anniversary in 1953, Sylvia and Benno performed all 10 Beethoven piano and violin sonatas in one day at Town Hall, a feat they would repeat at Alice Tully Hall in 1969. In 1954, they premiered the Concerto for Violin, Piano and Orchestra of the Czech composer Bohuslav Martinu, which was commissioned by them. Sylvia and Benno continued to perform together until Benno died in 1975.

Throughout their career Benno and Sylvia maintained a busy performing and teaching schedule, and chose to emphasize that over preparing for recordings. However, in 1965 Decca records produced "Gypsy Violin Classics," featuring Benno on the violin and Sylvia on piano. In May 1965, a High Fidelity reviewer wrote, “Rabinof’s pulsating, glossy tone and his spectacular velocity definitely bear the Auer label, long a distinguishing trademark in the annals of violin playing. He gives an impressive and satisfying account of himself in this collection.”

Sylvia Rabinof also taught and composed, specializing in composing improvisations based on the classics. From 1971 to 1979, she taught in the pre-college division at Juilliard, and she gave summer workshops at the Brevard Music Center in North Carolina.

For some 30 years, Sylvia wrote biographies of musicians and articles about improvisation for Junior Keynotes magazine, a publication of the National Federation of Music Clubs. Sylvia also served as chairperson of the federation's improvisation activities and regularly performed and gave workshops at the federation's annual convention.

In 1978, Sylvia married Charles Rothenberg, a lawyer and music lover. In 1989, Sylvia and Charles, who by then were spending their winters in Florida, moved permanently from New York to Florida. Charles died in 1992.

Sylvia continued to play the piano, compose, and teach, using the name Sylvia Rabinof, until her death at age 87 on January 20, 2001.

During the 1990s, Sylvia performed as a solo pianist and with other musicians, including violinist Ruggiero Ricci. In the mid-1990s, a CD featuring Ricci and Sylvia in a performance of the Sibelius Violin and Piano Sonata was produced.

In 2003, Pavilion Records, LTD, under the Pearl label, produced a CD made from tapes of performances by the Rabinofs in the 1940s and 1950s.

Sylvia's students included Ken Noda, Richard Allston, and Jose Ramos-Santana; and she mentored Richard Glazier, composing a variation on a theme by Gershwin for Glazier to perform.
