= Bengt Forsberg =

Swedish pianist (born 1952)

Bengt Forsberg (born 1952) is a Swedish concert pianist most famous for his numerous collaborations with the mezzo-soprano Anne Sofie von Otter. He participated in her project to record songs written in the concentration camp of Terezín. Forsberg has a reputation as a champion of neglected music and composers. He is highly acclaimed as a recital accompanist and regularly plays alongside Mats Lidström and Nils-Erik Sparf.

After graduating from the Gothenburg School of Music and Musicology, Forsberg was trained by Peter Feuchtwanger and Herman David Koppel.
