= St. Andrew's Church (Toronto) =

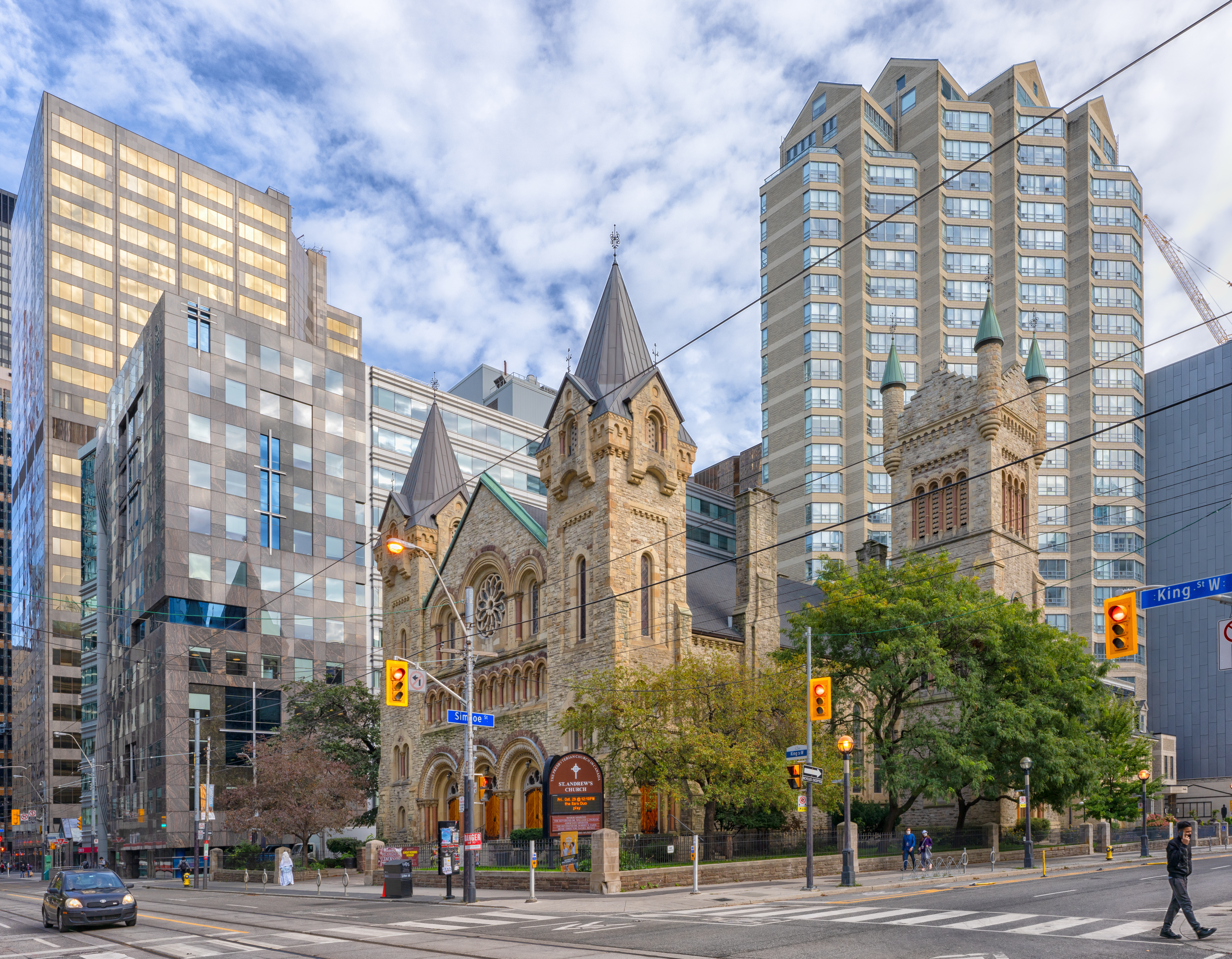
- St Andrew's Church, view from North-West

- Location of the church in Toronto
- 43°38′50″N 79°23′09″W
- Location: 73 Simcoe Street; Toronto, Ontario; M5J 1W9
- Denomination: Presbyterian
- Website: www.standrewstoronto.org

History
- Founded: 1830
- Dedication: St. Andrew

Architecture
- Heritage designation: City of Toronto heritage designation Ontario Provincial Plaque
- Architect: William George Storm
- Style: Romanesque Revival
- Groundbreaking: 1874
- Completed: February 13, 1876

St. Andrew's Church is a historic Presbyterian church located at the corner of King Street West and Simcoe Street in the city's downtown core of Toronto, Ontario, Canada. It was designed by William George Storm in the Romanesque Revival style and completed in 1876.

== History ==
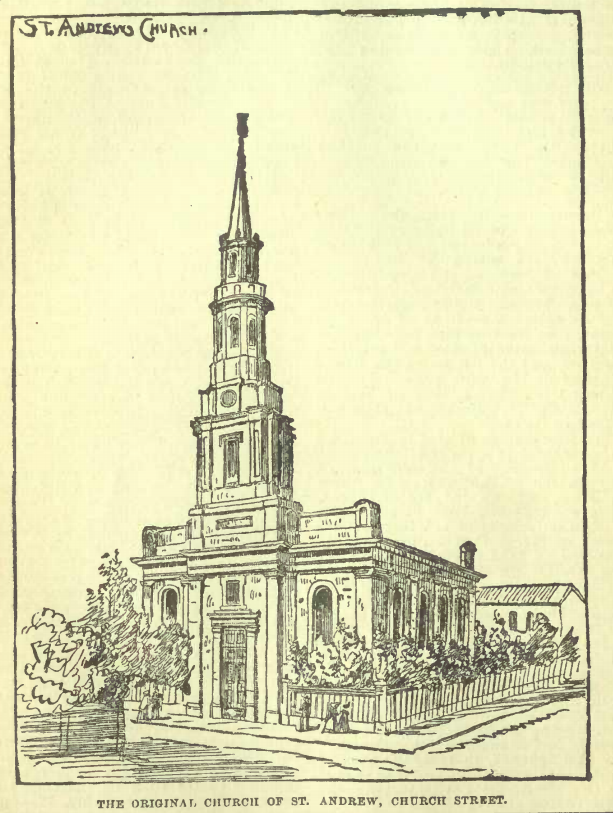
The original St. Andrew's Church building at Church and Adelaide streets

The congregation was founded in 1830 as the first Church of Scotland congregation in the Town of York. The original church building was located at the southwest corner of Church Street and Adelaide Street. It was designed by John Ewart.

After the 1843 split of the Presbyterian Church in Scotland, a portion of the congregation supportive of the Free Church Movement left St. Andrew's the following summer and founded Knox Presbyterian Church, along with another group (led by the Rev. James Harris) that had been separate since 1834.

The original church building eventually proved too small, and St. Andrew's moved to its current location at the southeast corner of King and Simcoe streets (one block west of University Avenue and the St. Andrew subway station, which got its name from the church) on February 13, 1876. This westward move caused some controversy, and the congregation split over the issue.

One group (62 of 403 members) continued in the old church building, which became known as Old St. Andrew's. In 1878, this group moved to a new building located on nearby Jarvis Street. The group remained there until 1951, when it joined with Westminster (formerly Yorkville Presbyterian) - Central (formerly Methodist) to become St. Andrew's United Church at 117 Bloor Street East. The church building on Jarvis Street was sold to another denomination and became St. Andrew's Evangelical Lutheran Church.

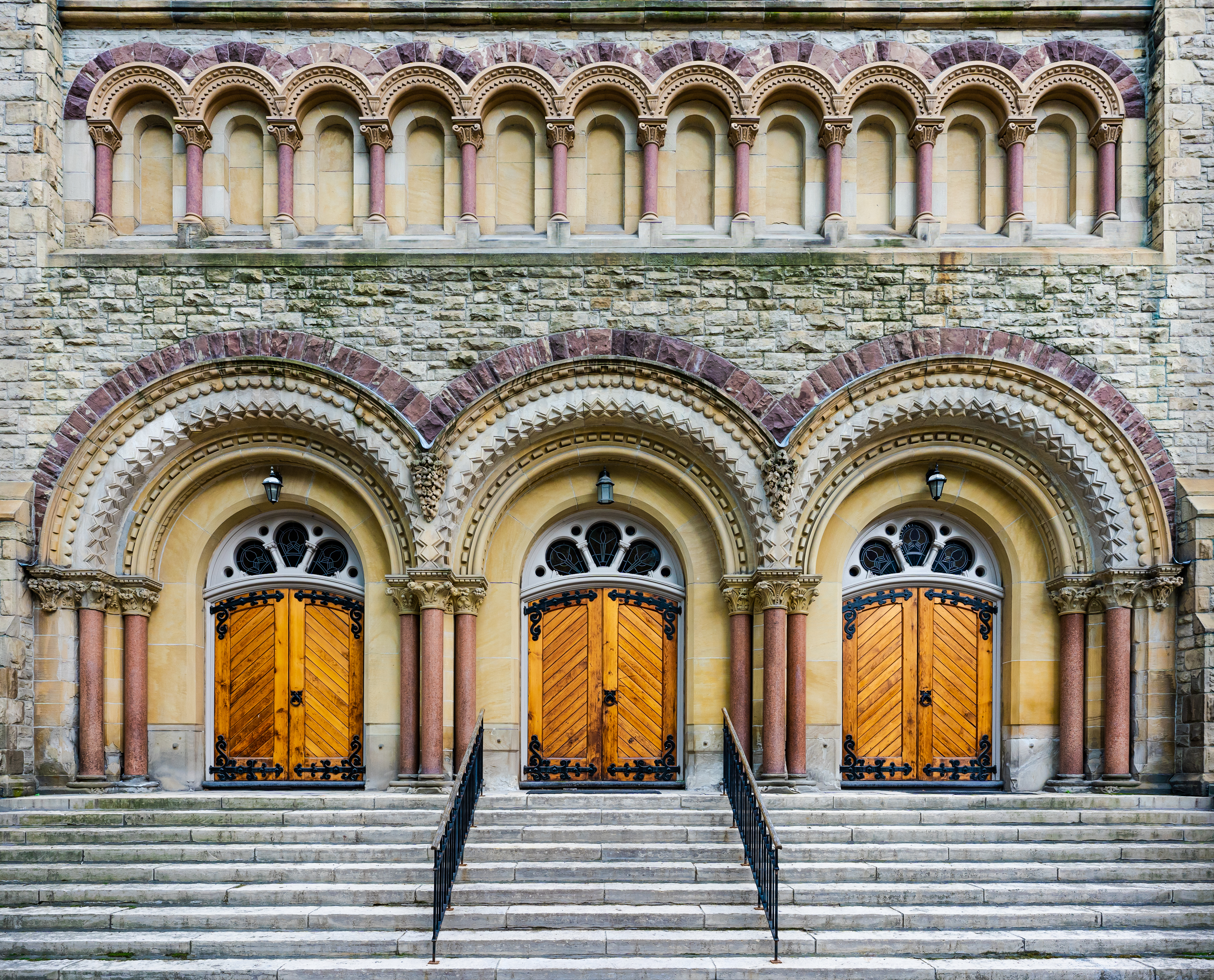
The portal of St. Andrew's Church

The main congregation moved in 1876 to the new Romanesque Revival church that became known as New St. Andrew's. This building was designed by noted Toronto architect William George Storm and was the central Presbyterian church in Toronto, with an addition and renovation in 1906.

It became especially well known under the ministry of renowned orator the Rev. D.J. Macdonnell (1870–1896), who pushed the church towards an active social role, and was the centre of a heresy trial in 1876 (a minor bump in the recently formed Presbyterian Church in Canada). As such, the intersection of King and Simcoe was popularly said to represent one of the four parts of Toronto society, namely Salvation. The others were: Legislation, the Lieutenant-Governor's Residence; Education, the original home of Upper Canada College; and damnation, a tavern.

The congregation was one of the most active in opposition to the union that saw the majority of Canadian Presbyterian churches join the United Church of Canada in 1925. The St. Andrew's congregation, under the leadership of the Rev. Dr. Stuart C. Parker, voted 94% (19-733) against joining the new church. It was at St. Andrew's that representatives of the remaining Presbyterian churches from across Canada met for a "Congress", as well as the General Assembly of the Continuing Presbyterian Church in June 1925. Around this time, 73 Simcoe Street became used as the postal address for the anti-Church Union group, the Presbyterian Church Association.

Later in the 20th century, the church's downtown location presented a challenge to St. Andrew's, since the area had become largely industrial and later one of the poorest in the city. Increasingly, the church patrons were living further north. There were thus many discussions of again moving the church, but each time the congregation voted to remain put.

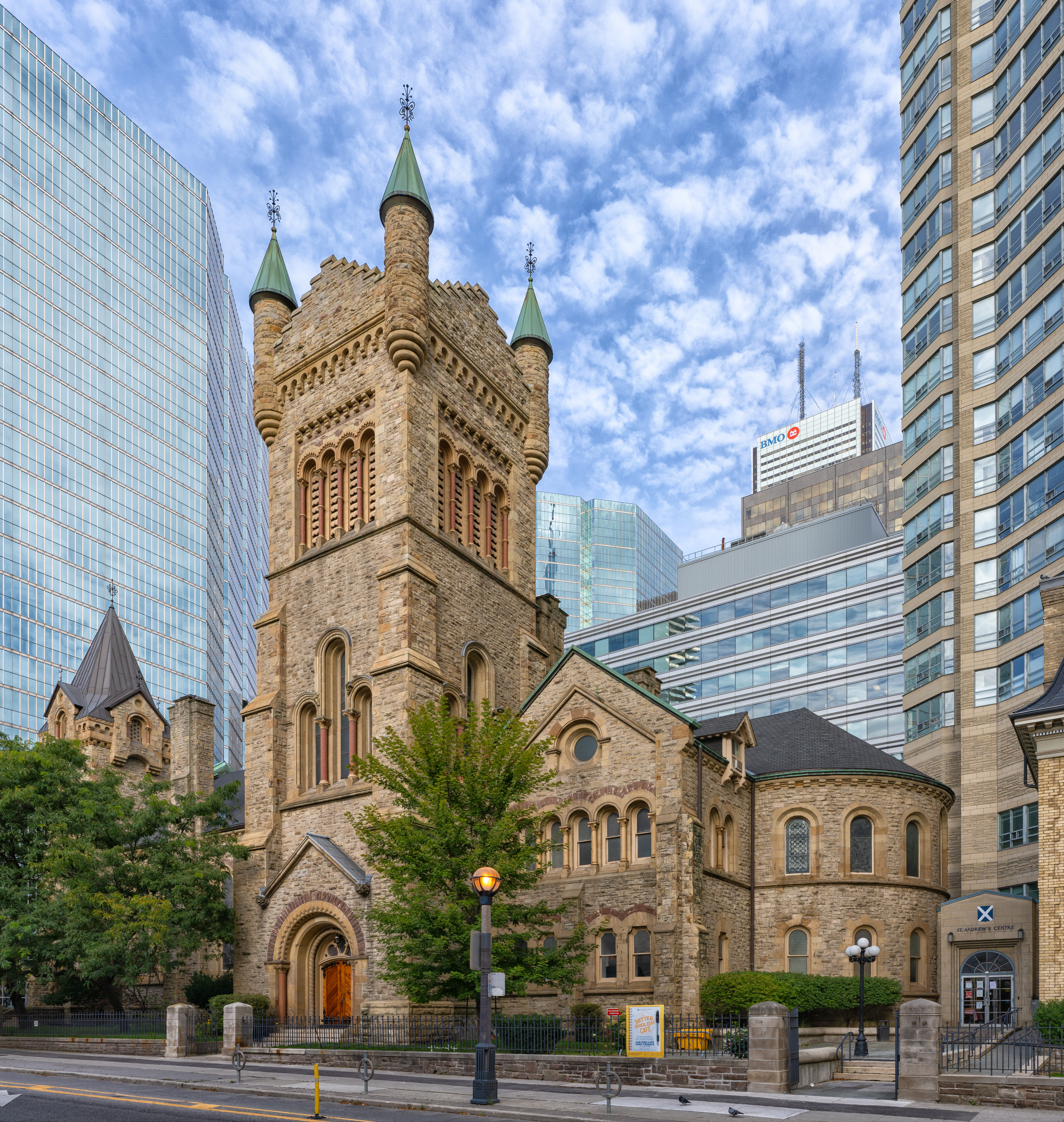
St Andrew's Church, view from South-West

Eventually, the revival of the downtown core in the 1970s and 1980s began with the opening of the St. Andrew Subway Station at nearby University Avenue in 1963. Further redevelopment of the area, including the addition of Roy Thomson Hall on the southwest corner of Simcoe and King Streets, transformed the neighbourhood, and the church is again prospering. After acquiring air rights from new buildings in the area, there was an extensive rebuilding at the south end, including construction of a new condominium tower in which the congregation retained the first three floors.

The property (consisting of the manse and the church building) is designated under part IV of the Ontario Heritage Act since August 10, 1981. There is also a Heritage Easement on the property since July 1981. The designation notes that it was designed by William Storm in 1875 with an alteration in 1907 by Curry, Sproat & Rolph.

The congregation has taken leadership in ministry to the poor, with "Out of the Cold", coordinated by famous author Stevie Cameron, and a Boarding Homes Ministry, as well as involvement with the Presbyterian Church in Canada's Evangel Hall.

The congregation also maintains ties with its Scottish roots. In March 2005, to celebrate their 175th Anniversary as a congregation, the Moderator of the Church of Scotland, Dr. Alison Elliot, was involved as their Anniversary Speaker. The 48th Highlanders Regiment has a strong link with the congregation, and the regiment's museum is located in the basement of the church. The museum includes regimental uniforms, medals, photographs, weapons and other artifacts. Founded in 1959, the museum opened in its current location in 1997.

== Clergy ==
=== Senior ministers ===
- William Rintoul (1831-1834)
- William Turnbull Leach (1835-1842), left to become an Anglican Church Minister, and later a professor at McGill University in Montreal, Quebec
- John Barclay (1843-1869)
- Daniel James Macdonnell (1870-1896) (Note: Died during Ministry in congregation)
- William J. McCaughan (1897-1898)
- Armstrong Black (1899-1905)
- T. Crawford Brown (1905-1914), became World War I Chaplain with 48th Highlanders of Canada
- Thomas Eakin (Assistant 1907–1914, 1915–1921), appointed to The Presbyterian College, Montreal, later Principal of Knox College, University of Toronto
- Stuart Crawford Parker (1923-1950), Moderator of the General Assembly of the Presbyterian Church in Canada, 1939
- J. C. Paul Stirling (1949 Associate and Successor, 1950–1972)
- H. Douglas Stewart (1972-1983), (uncle of journalist Brian Stewart)
- James W. Evans (1984-1988)
- Cameron Brett (October 1990 – 2006)
- William G. (Will) Ingram (September 2007 – present)

=== Assistants, associates, and deaconesses ===
- Esther Georgina Wylie (Deaconess), -1922
- J.M. Macdonald
- A. Wylie Mahon (1918-1929)
- R.J. Macdonald
- Miss Caldecott (Deaconess)
- Miss Christina J. Moffat (Deaconess), 1920s-1930s
- Lynda Hoffos (Reid) (Deaconess)
- Michael Farris
- Patricia Strung
- Michael Barnes
- George C. Vais (1998-2010), General Assembly Moderator, 1995
- Robert N. Faris, inducted May 29, 2011

== Organists ==
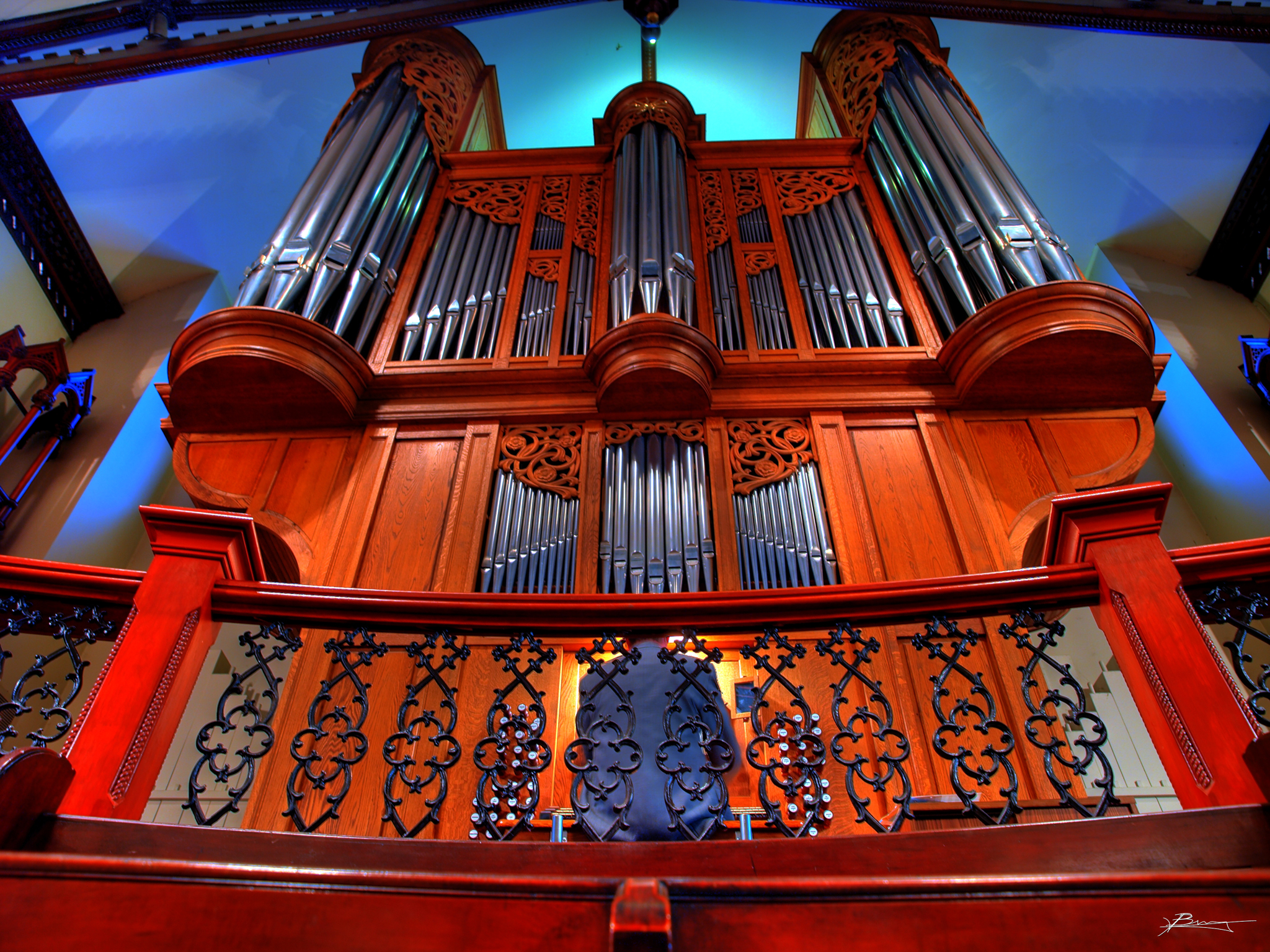
Pipe organ used at St. Andrew's Church

- Humfrey Anger (1896-1902)
- Douglas Bodle (Organist Emeritus)

== See also ==
- List of oldest buildings and structures in Toronto
