= Kaija Saarikettu =

Finnish violinist and professor

Kaija Saarikettu (born 17 May 1957, Ekenäs, Finland) is a Finnish violinist and the Professor of strings and chamber music at Sibelius Academy (now part of the University of the Arts Helsinki).

== Life and career ==
Saarikettu graduated from Sibelius Academy in 1977, after which she continued her studies in Sweden under Endre Wolf. In 1980, she shared first prize in the Kuopio Violin Competition, and was a finalist in the International Jean Sibelius Violin Competition.

She began teaching the violin at Sibelius Academy in 1989, and was granted tenure there as Professor of solo strings and chamber music in 1995. In 1997-1998, she also held a professorial post at Sweden's Edsberg Music Institute, part of the Royal College of Music, Stockholm.

Saarikettu has performed internationally in e.g. the USA, UK and Russia, as well as judging violin competitions such as the 2015 International Joseph Joachim Violin Competition. She is the artistic director of the annual Kaustinen Chamber Music Week. She is also known as a composer and conductor.

Saarikettu has recorded nine albums, mostly for the Finlandia label of Warner Classics; these include the complete violin works of Jean Sibelius, as well as music by Einar Englund and other Finnish composers.
