= Shooting at the 1984 Summer Olympics – Men's 50 metre rifle prone =

Sports shooting at the Olympics

Men's 50 metre rifle, prone at the Games of the XXIII Olympiad
- Venue: Los Angeles, United States
- Date: July 30, 1984
- Competitors: 71 from 46 nations

Medalists
1st place, gold medalist(s)		Edward Etzel	United States
2nd place, silver medalist(s)		Michel Bury	France
3rd place, bronze medalist(s)		Michael Sullivan	Great Britain

The men's 50 metre rifle, prone was a shooting sports event held as part of the Shooting at the 1984 Summer Olympics programme. The competition was held on July 30, 1984, at the shooting ranges in Los Angeles. 71 shooters from 46 nations competed.

== Results ==
Place	Shooter	Total
1	Edward Etzel (USA)	599
2	Michel Bury (FRA)	596
3	Michael Sullivan (GBR)	596
4	Alister Allan (GBR)	595
5	Francesco Nanni (SMR)	594
6	Hans Strand (SWE)	594
7	John Duus (NOR)	594
8	Ulrich Lind (FRG)	593
9	Víctor Garcés (MEX)	593
10	Elio Gnagnarelli (ITA)	593
11	Jean-Pierre Amat (FRA)	593
12	Ulrich Sarbach (SUI)	593
13T	Donald Durbin (USA)	592
13T	Stephen Petterson (NZL)	592
13T	Mauri Röppänen (FIN)	592
13T	Yun Deok-Ha (KOR)	592
17T	Roland Jacoby (LUX)	591
17T	Bo Lilja (DEN)	591
17T	Hiroyuki Nakajo (JPN)	591
17T	Alan Smith (AUS)	591
17T	Constantin Stan (ROU)	591
17T	Harald Stenvaag (NOR)	591
23T	Yair Davidovitz (ISR)	590
23T	Ignatios Psyllakis (GRE)	590
25T	Manuel Hawayek (PUR)	589
25T	Lothar Heinrich (AUT)	589
25T	Gilbert Hoef (BEL)	589
25T	Werner Seibold (FRG)	589
25T	Pat Vamplew (CAN)	589
30T	Jack Achilles (NED)	588
30T	Luis del Cerro (ESP)	588
30T	Jorge González (ESP)	588
30T	Roger Jansson (SWE)	588
30T	Jiang Rong (CHN)	588
30T	Mikko Mattila (FIN)	588
30T	José Medina (PHI)	588
30T	Ricardo Rusticucci (ARG)	588
30T	Udomsak Theinthong (THA)	588
30T	Xu Xiaoguang (CHN)	588
30T	Robert Zedwane (CAN)	588
41	José Álvarez (MEX)	587
42	Goran Maksimović (YUG)	586
43	Norito Chosa (JPN)	585
44	Gwak Jeong-hun (KOR)	584
45T	Durval Guimarães (BRA)	583
45T	Justo Moreno (PER)	583
45T	Anton Müller (SUI)	583
45T	Bhagirath Samai (IND)	583
49T	Dadallah Al-Bulushi (OMA)	582
49T	Sulaiman Mohamed (QAT)	582
49T	Itzhak Yonassi (ISR)	582
52T	Ali Hamed Al-Awasa (JOR)	581
52T	Talak Al-Otaibi (KSA)	581
52T	Waldemar Capucci (BRA)	581
55T	Abdullah Al-Usaimi (KSA)	578
55T	Hugo Romero (ECU)	578
55T	Peter Rull Jr. (HKG)	578
55T	Theo Schurte (LIE)	578
55T	Attif Soudi (EGY)	578
55T	Tanin Thaisinlp (THA)	578
61	Mohamed Al-Shushe (JOR)	577
62	Pier Paolo Taddei (SMR)	576
63	Mohamed Amin Fikry (EGY)	575
64	Joseph Chan (PNG)	573
65T	Jadaan Tarjam Al-Shammari (QAT)	572
65T	Remo Sele (LIE)	572
67T	Zaher Al-Jamudi (OMA)	569
67T	Dennis Hardman (ZIM)	569
69	Pierre Boisson (MON)	563
70	Abdullah Ali (BRN)	561
71	Ali Al-Khalifa (BRN)	544
