= The Voice of Finland =

Finnish reality singing competition

- Created by: John de Mol; Roel van Velzen
- Presented by: Axl Smith; Heikki Paasonen
- Judges: Elastinen; Lauri Tähkä; Michael Monroe; Paula Koivuniemi; Anne Mattila; Mira Luoti; Olli Lindholm^{†}; Redrama; Tarja Turunen; Anna Puu; Toni Wirtanen; Juha Tapio; Sipe Santapukki; Maija Vilkkumaa; Paradise Mikko; Sanni; Arttu Wiskari; Jenni Vartiainen
- Country of origin: Finland
- Original language: Finnish
- No. of seasons: 15
- No. of episodes: 118

Production
- Producers: Talpa Media Group (2011–2019); ITV Studios Finland (2020–present)
- Production location: Helsinki

Original release
- Network: Nelonen
- Release: 30 December 2011 – present

Promotional photograph of the Coaches of The Voice of Finland

The Voice of Finland is a Finnish reality singing competition and local version of The Voice first broadcast as The Voice of Holland. The series premiered on Nelonen on 30 December 2011 and the first season concluded in April 2012. A second season started on 4 January 2013 and concluded on 26 April 2013. The series was further renewed for a third season, which premiered on 3 January 2014.

One of the important premises of the show is the quality of the singing talent. Four coaches, themselves popular performing artists, train the talents in their group and occasionally perform with them. Talents are selected in blind auditions, where the coaches cannot see, but only hear the auditioner.

The series is mainly shot at the Logomo cultural venue in Turku with few exceptions made in regards of blind auditions or battles.

== Format ==
The series consists of three phases: a blind audition, a battle phase, and live performance shows. Four judges/coaches, all noteworthy recording artists, choose teams of contestants through a blind audition process. Each judge has the length of the auditioner's performance (about one minute) to decide if he or she wants that singer on his or her team; if two or more judges want the same singer (as happens frequently), the singer has the final choice of coach.

Each team of singers is mentored and developed by its respective coach. In the second stage, called the battle phase, coaches have two of their team members battle against each other directly by singing the same song together, with the coach choosing which team member to advance from each of four individual "battles" into the first live round. Within that first live round, the surviving six acts from each team again compete head-to-head, with public votes determining one of two acts from each team that will advance to the final eight, while the coach chooses which of the remaining acts comprises the other performer remaining on the team.

In the final phase, the remaining contestants compete against each other in live broadcasts. The television audience and the coaches have equal say 50/50 in deciding who moves on to the semi-final. In the semi-final, the results are based on a mix of the public vote, advance vote on the previous week's performances, and voting of coaches. Each carries an equal weight of 100 points for a total of 300 points.

With one team member remaining for each coach, the final 4 contestants compete against each other in the finale with the outcome decided by the advance and the public vote, both with equal weight of 100 points for a total of 200 points.

== Coaches' timeline ==
Coach	Seasons															
Coach	1	2	3	4	5	6	7	8	9	10	11	12	13	14	15	16
Michael Monroe																
Elastinen																
Paula Koivuniemi																
Lauri Tähkä																
Mira Luoti																
Anne Mattila																
Redrama																
Olli Lindholm^{†}																
Tarja Turunen																
Anna Puu																
Toni Wirtanen																
Sipe Santapukki																
Juha Tapio																
Maija Vilkkumaa																
Sanni																
Arttu Wiskari																
Jenni Vartiainen																

=== Coaches Gallery ===
Current coaches

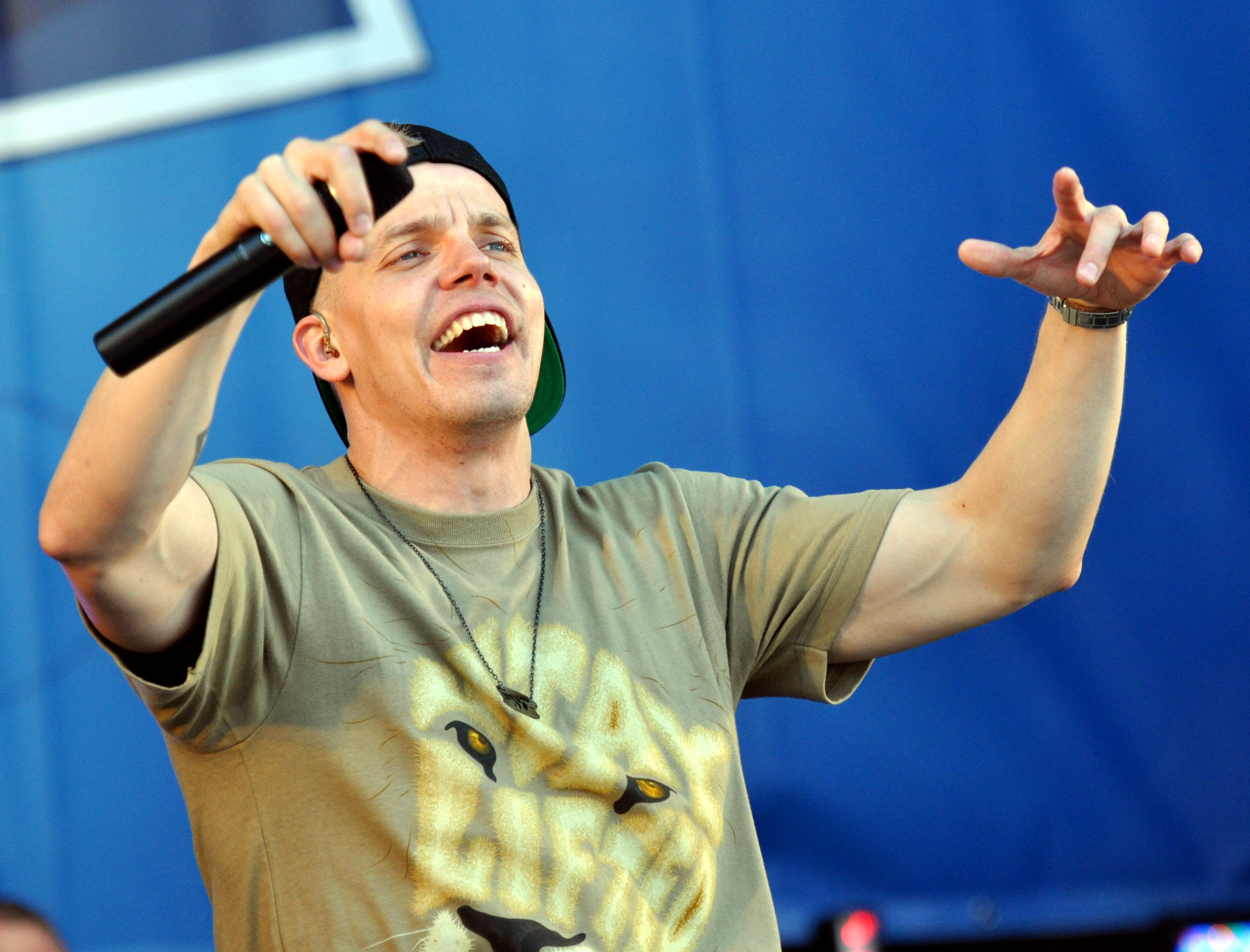
Elastinen (2011–2014, 2023–)

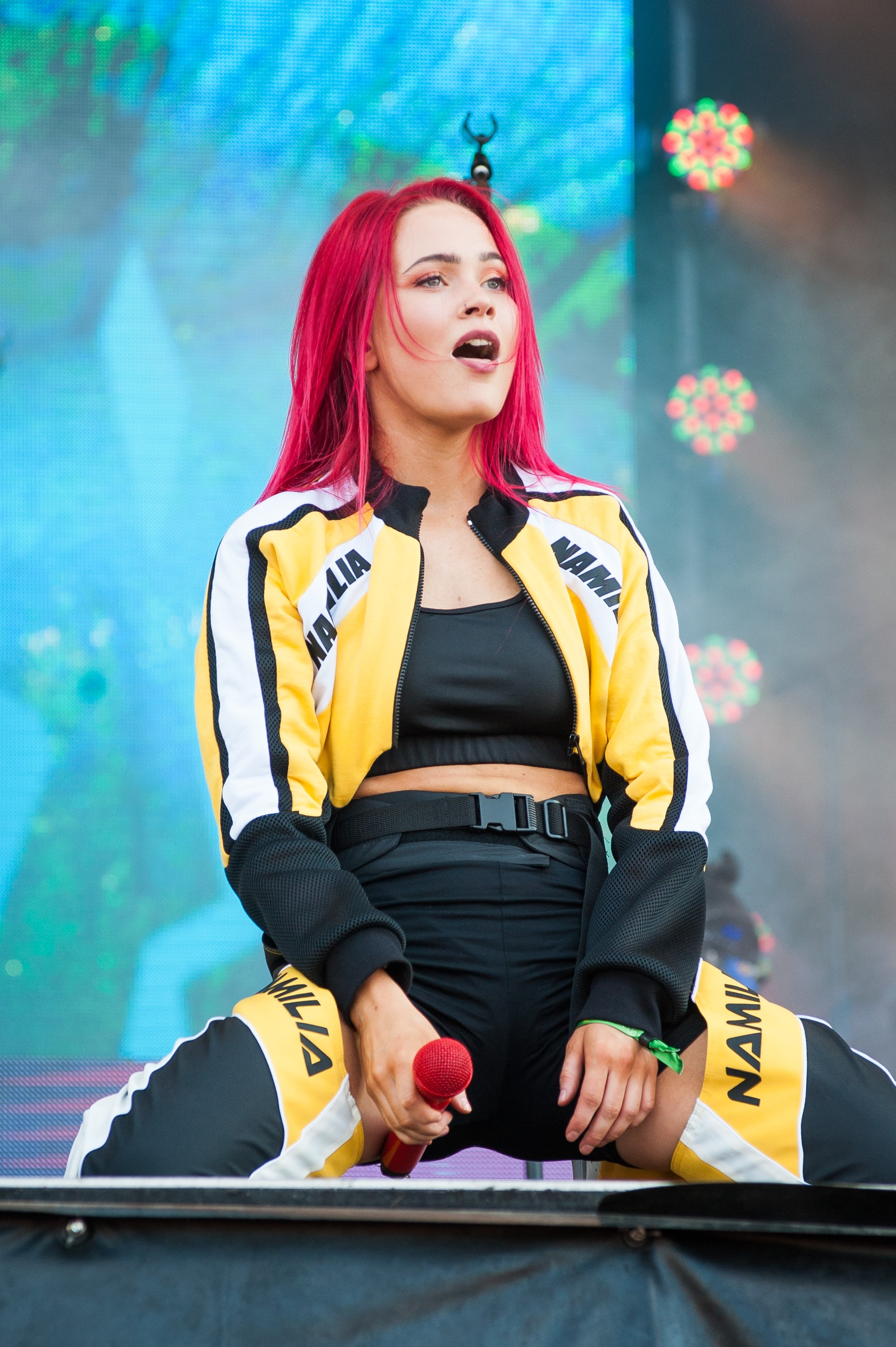
Sanni (2024–)

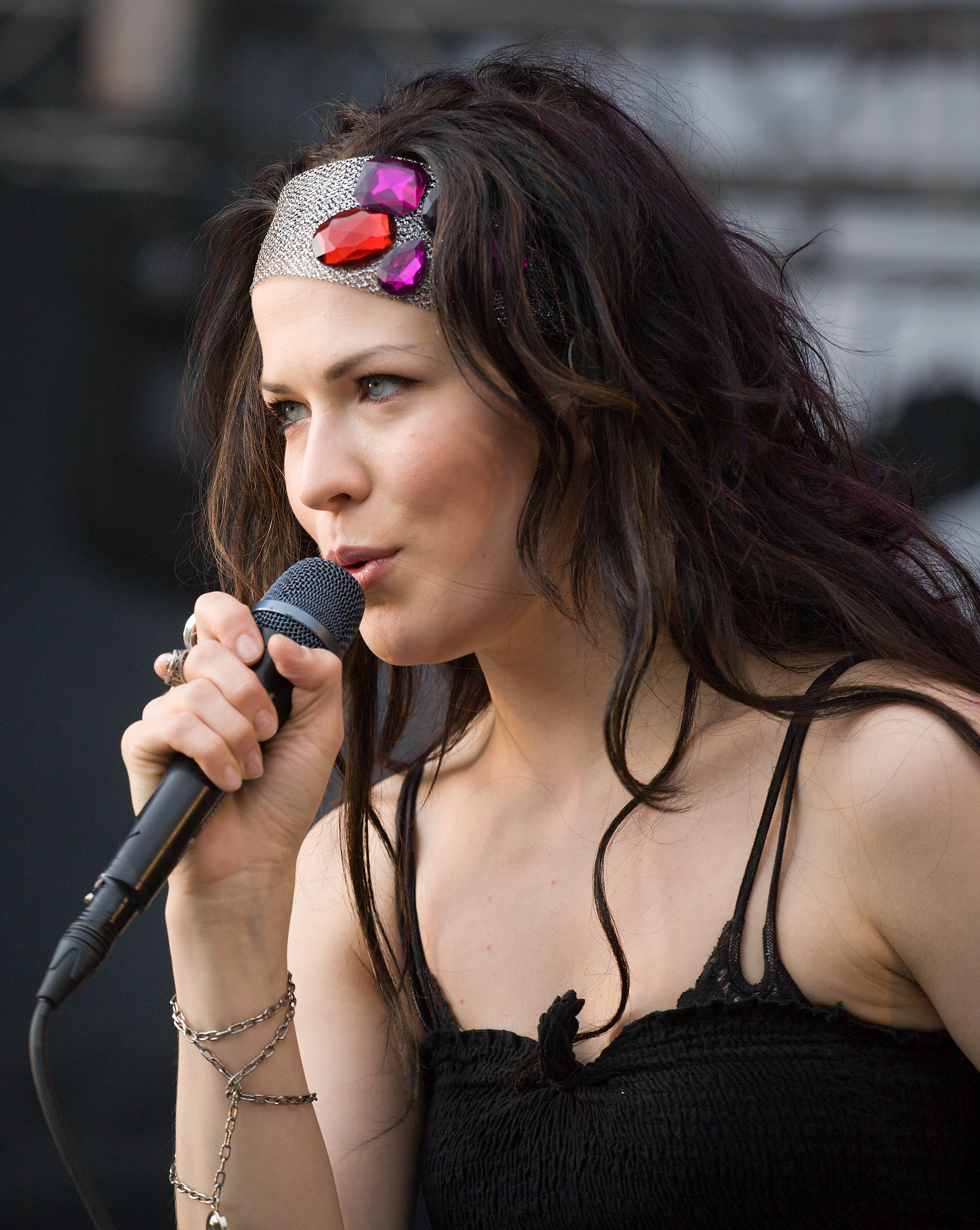
Jenni Vartiainen (2026–)
Former coaches

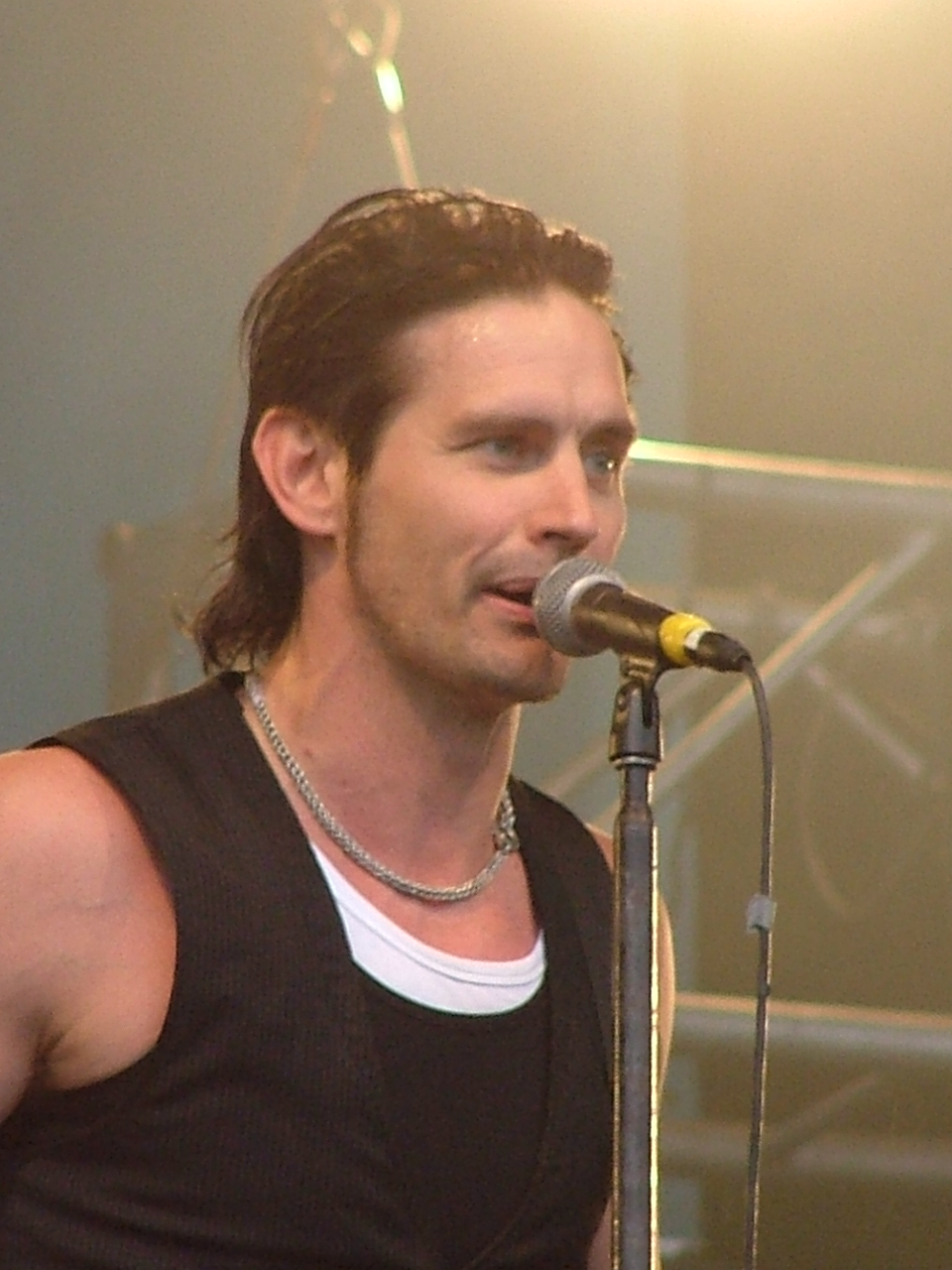
Lauri Tähkä (2011–2013)

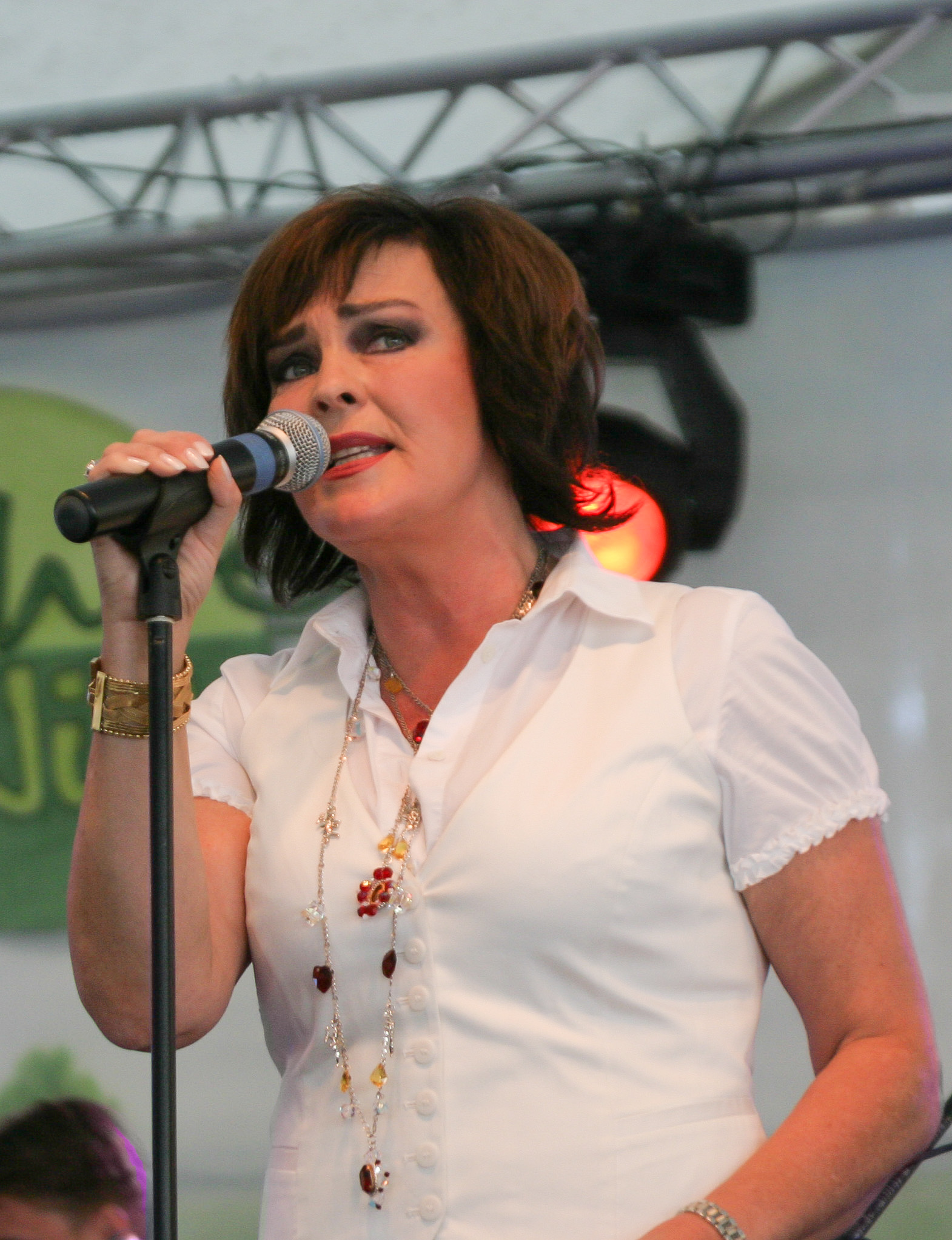
Paula Koivuniemi (2011–2013)

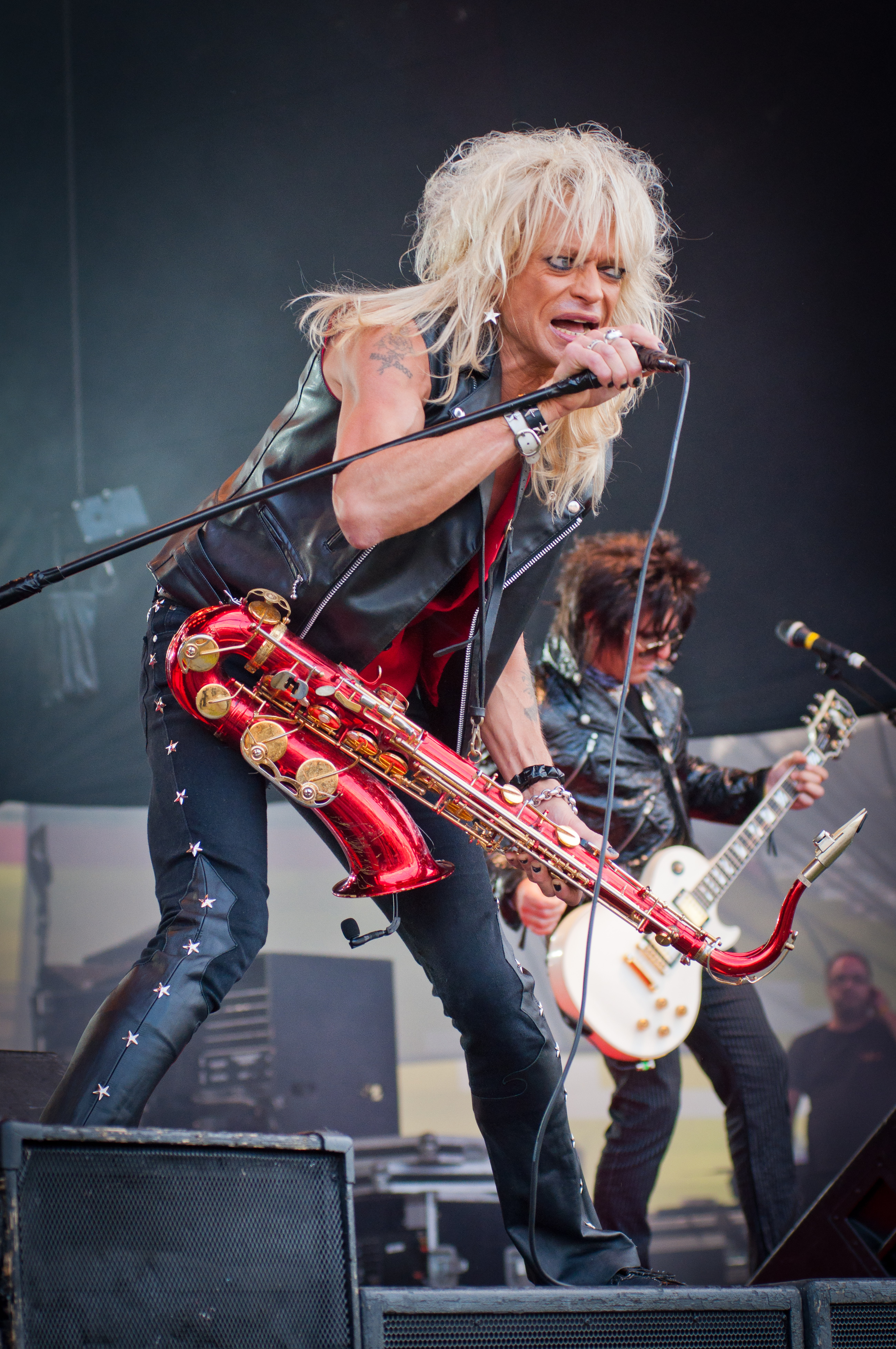
Michael Monroe (2011–2017)

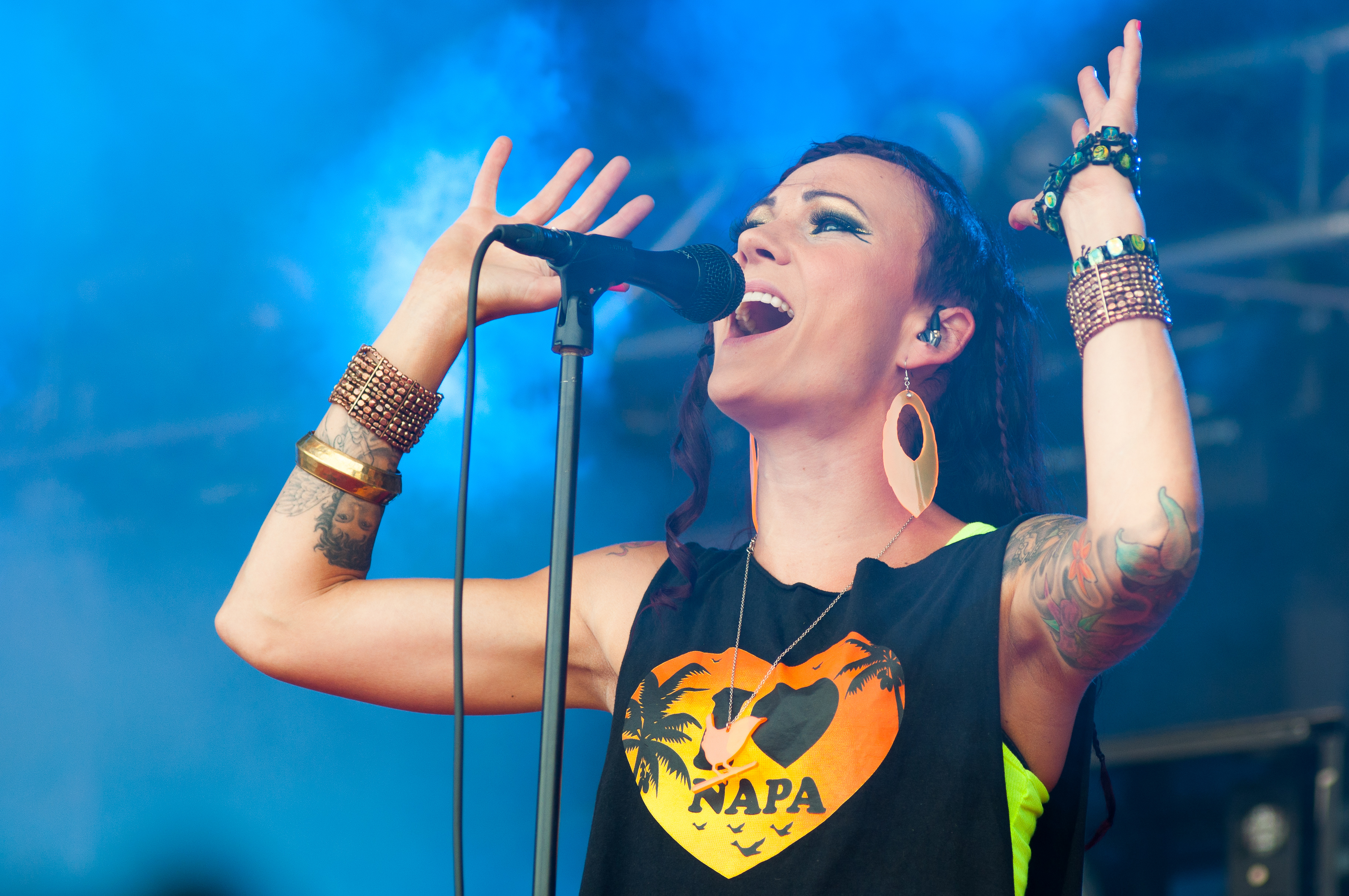
Mira Luoti (2014)

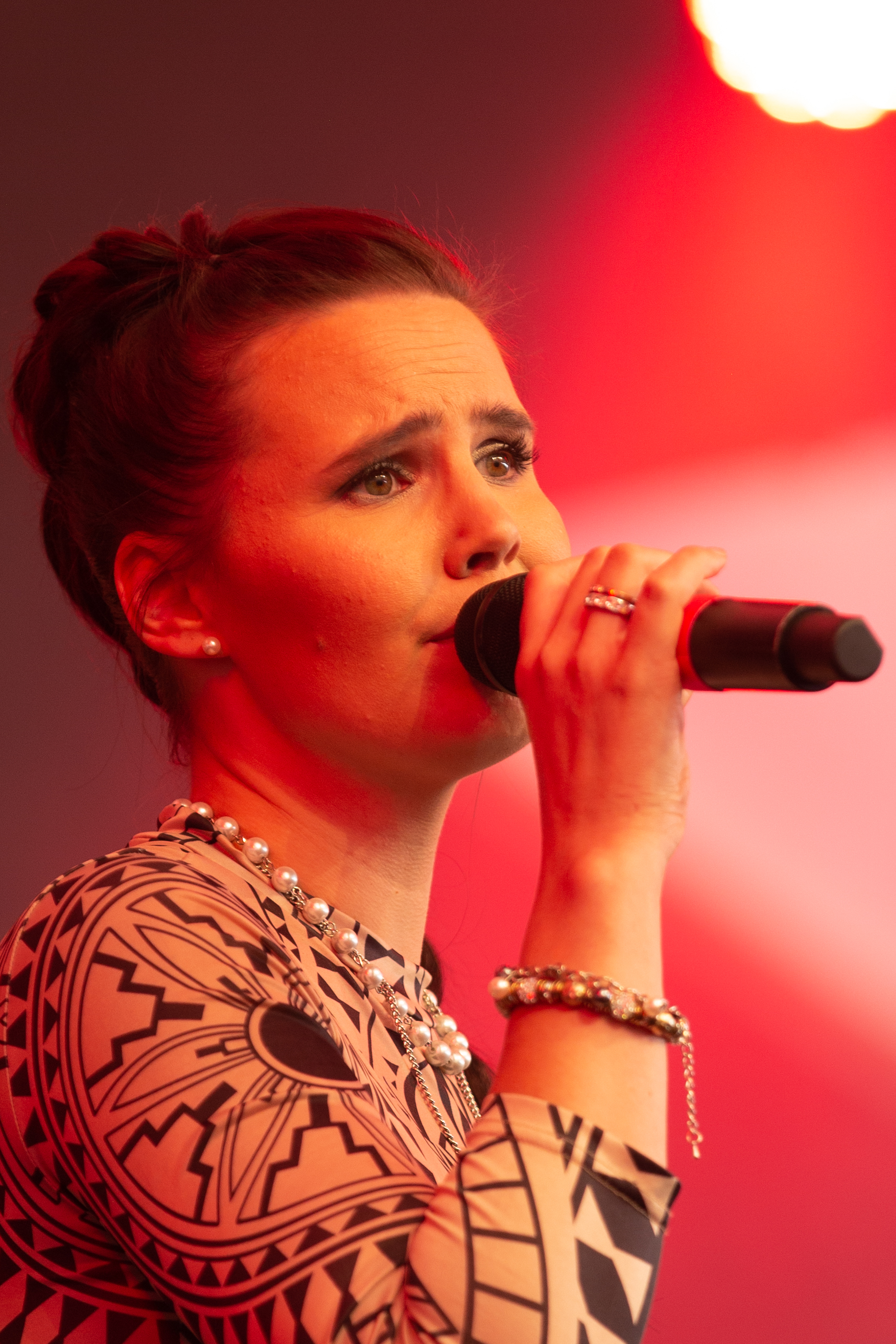
Anne Mattila (2014)

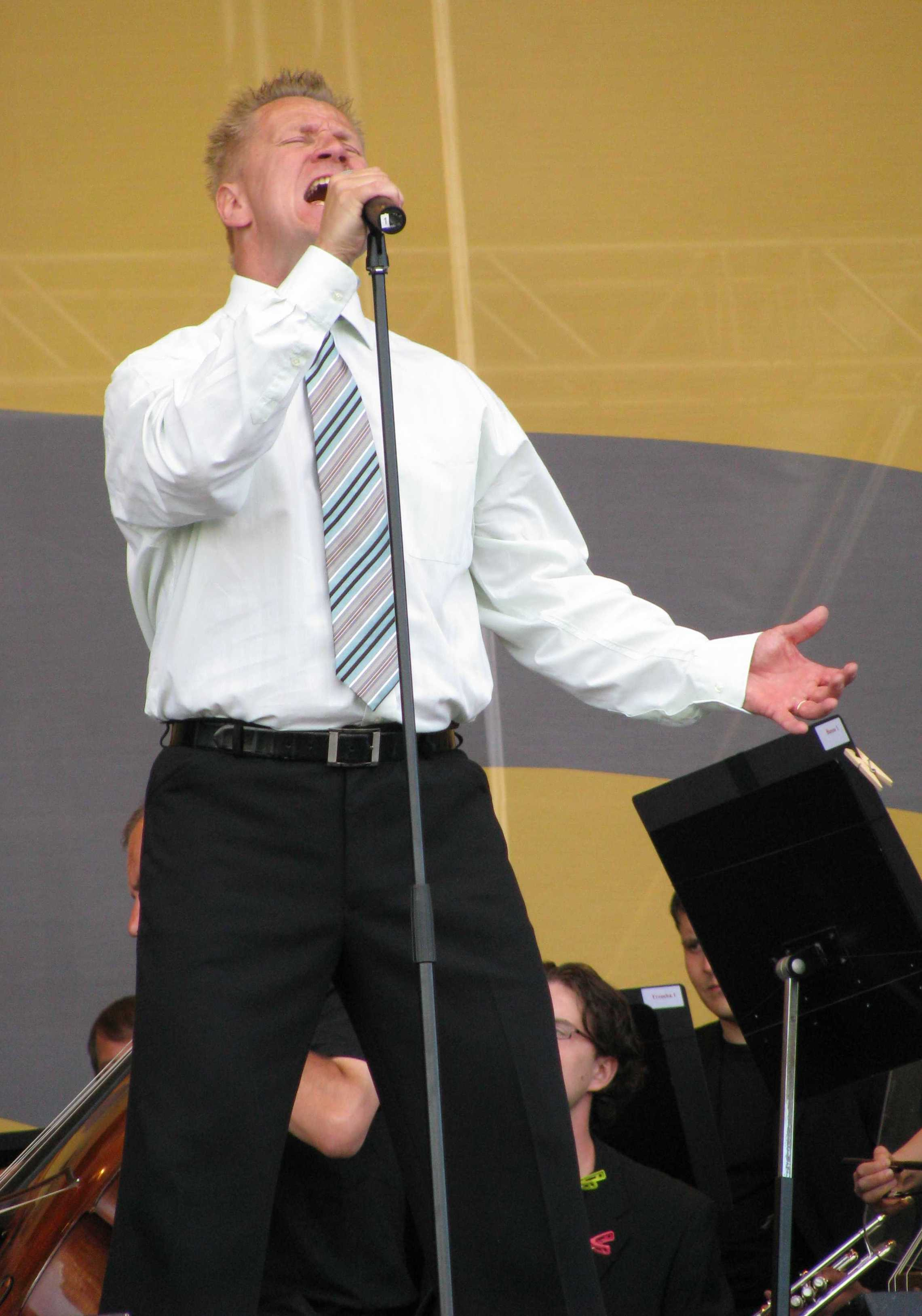
Olli Lindholm^{†} (2015–2019)

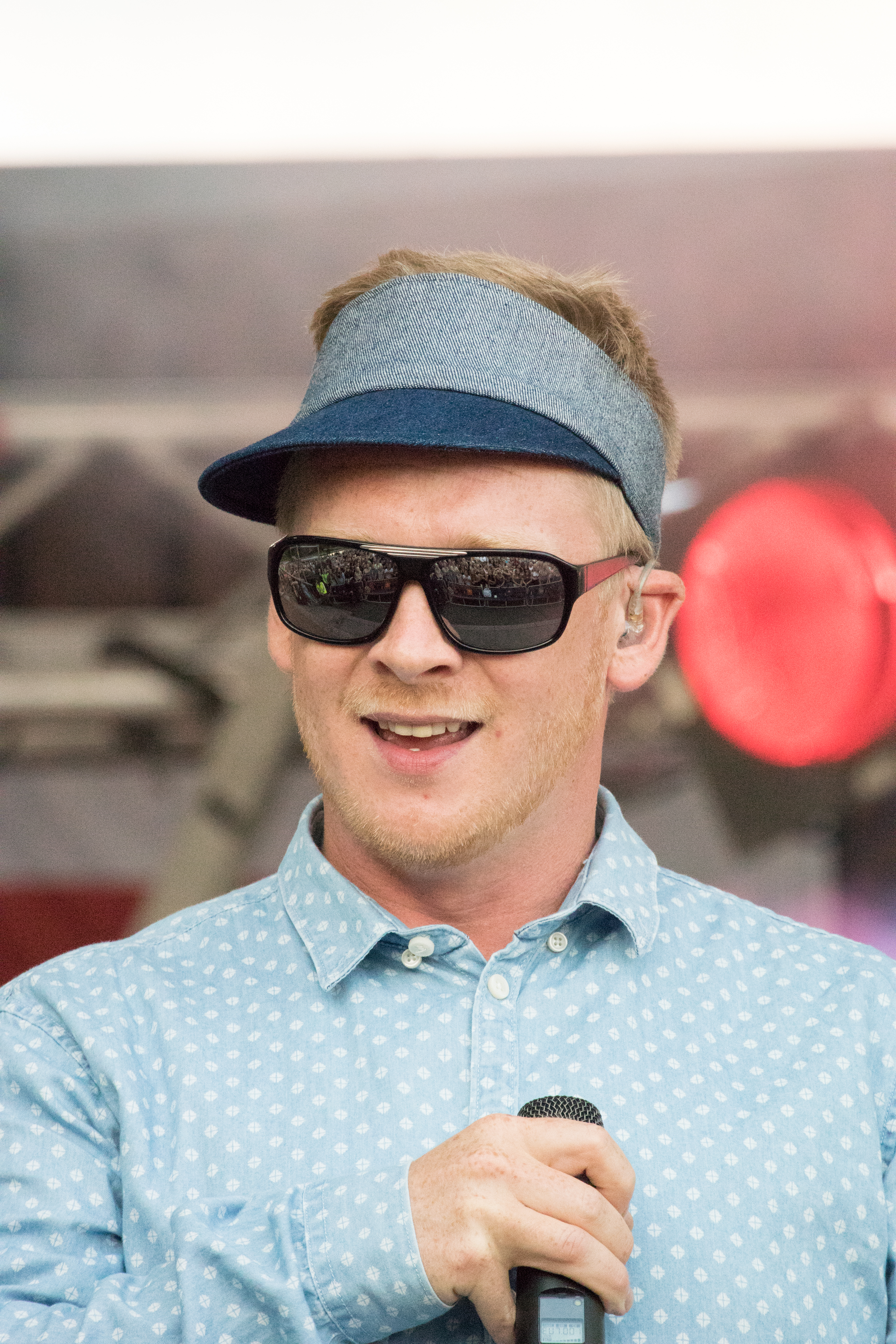
Redrama (2015–2021)

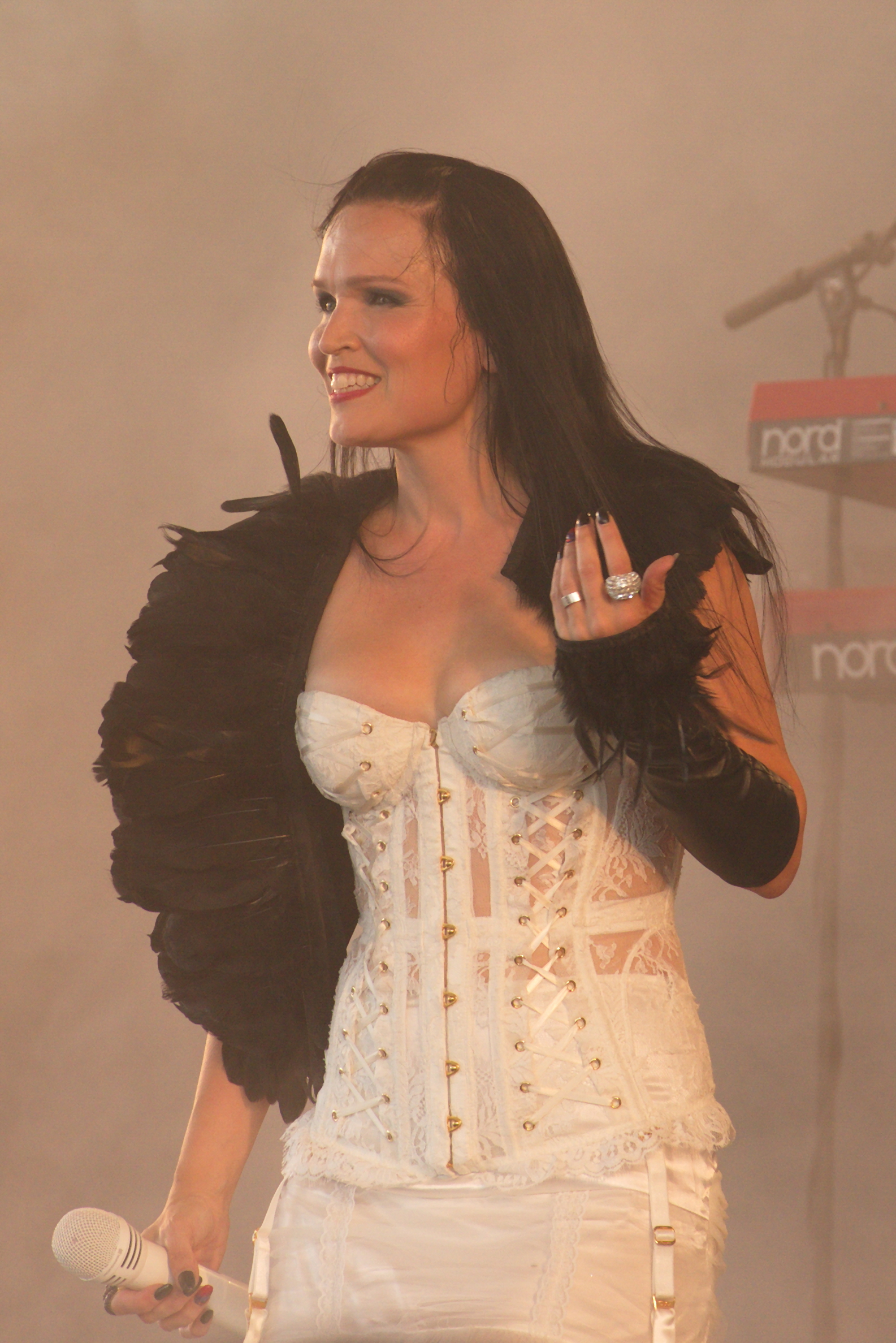
Tarja Turunen (2015–2016)

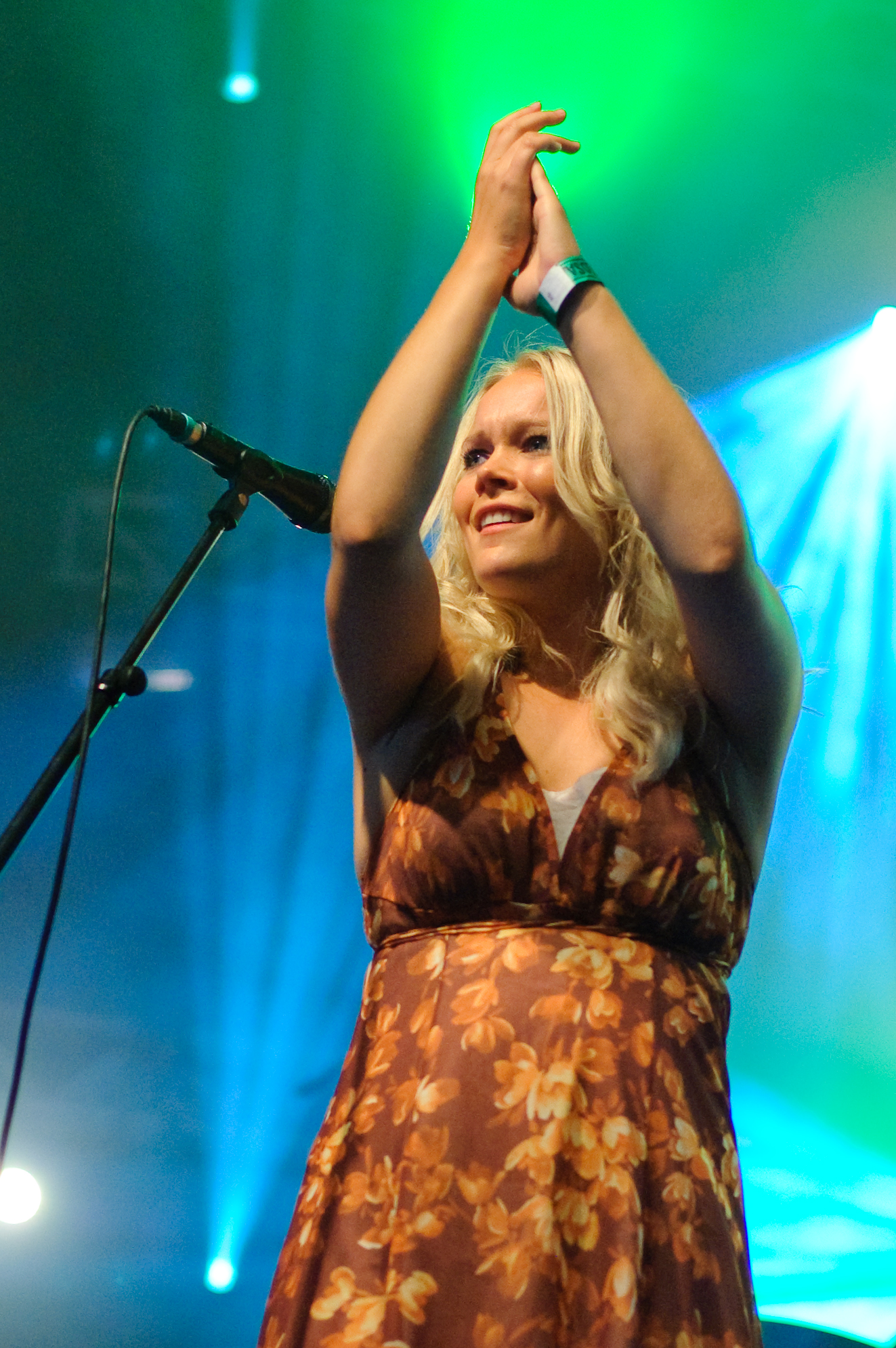
Anna Puu (2017–2020, 2022–2023)

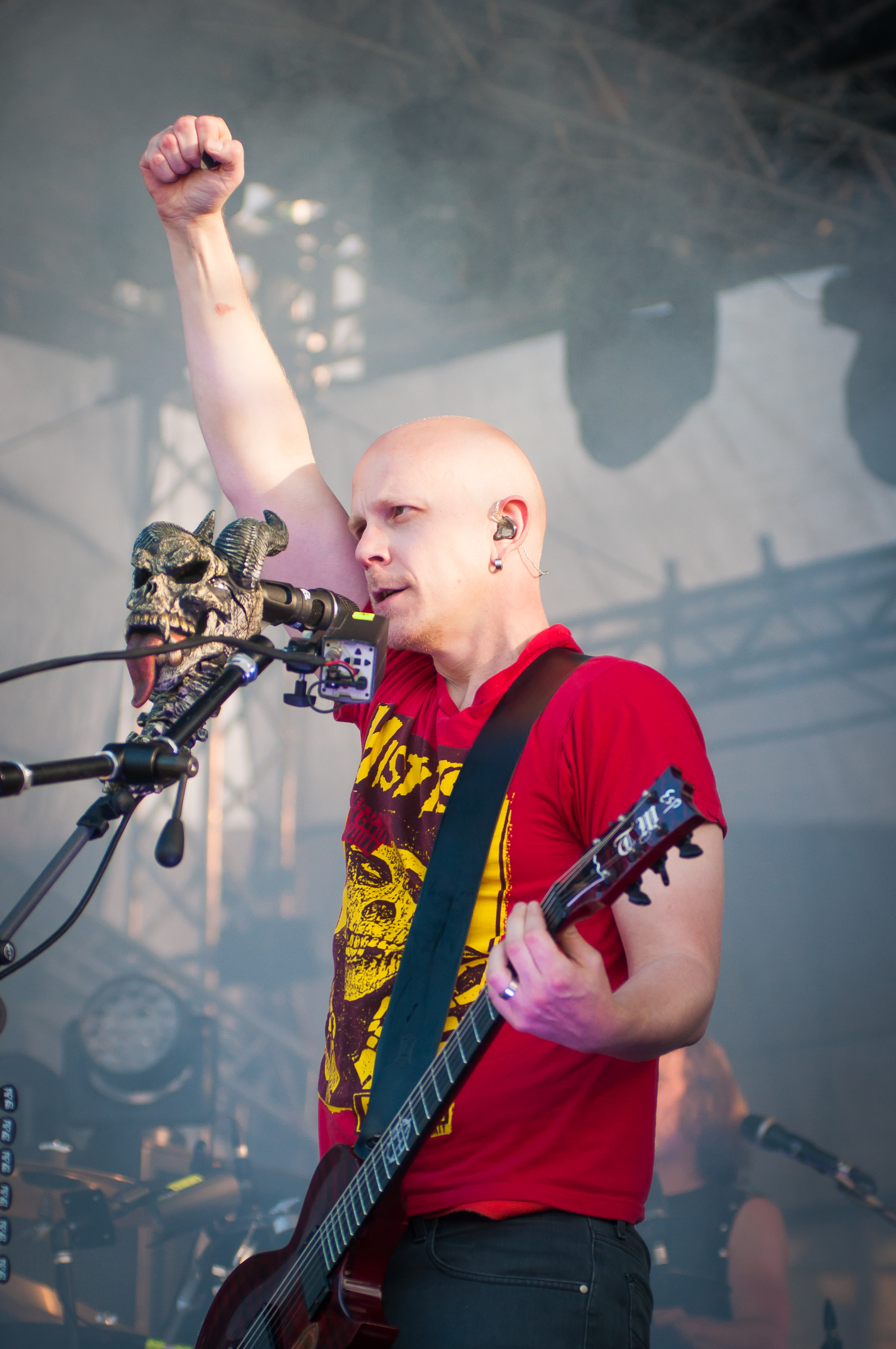
Toni Wirtanen (solo, 2018–2019; duo, 2020–2023)

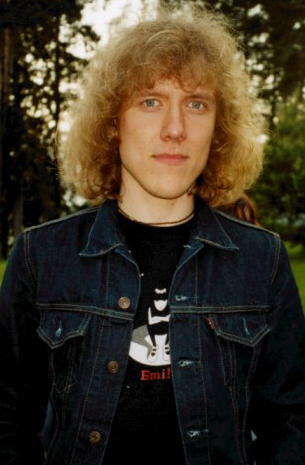
Sipe Santapukki (duo, 2020–2023)

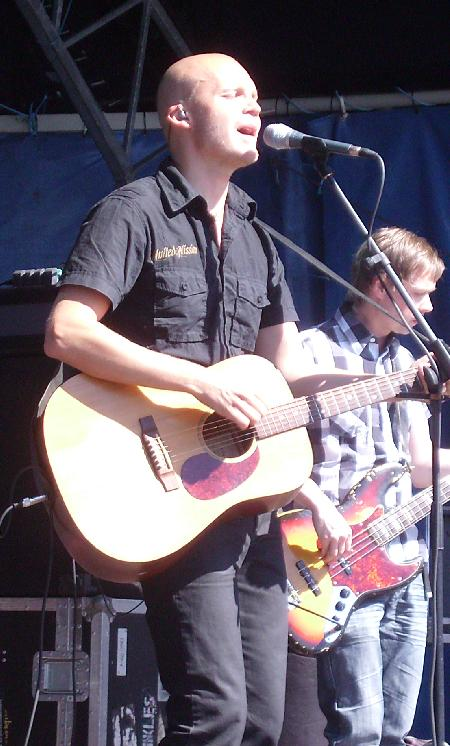
Juha Tapio (2020–2022)

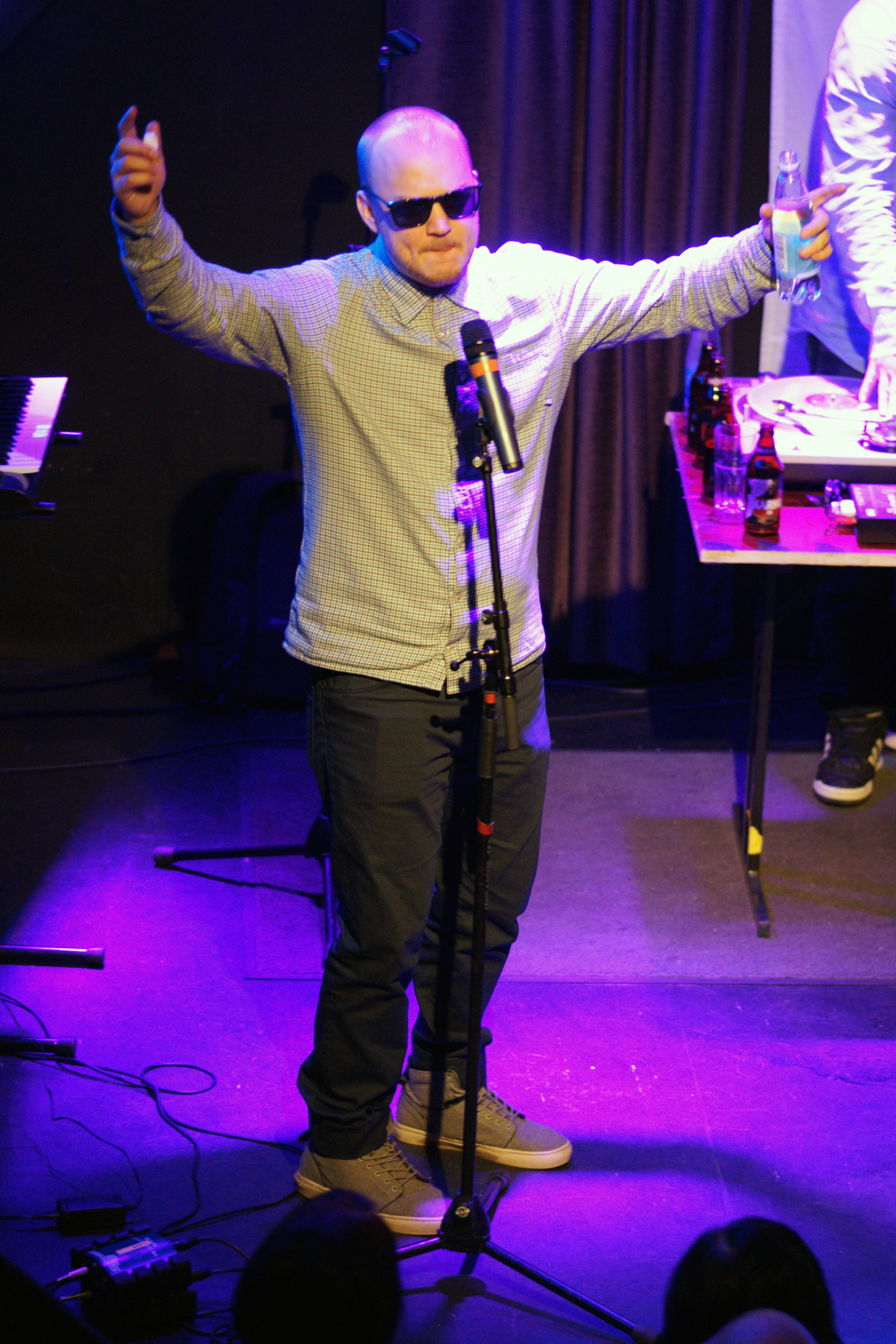
Paradise Mikko (Comeback Stage, 2021)

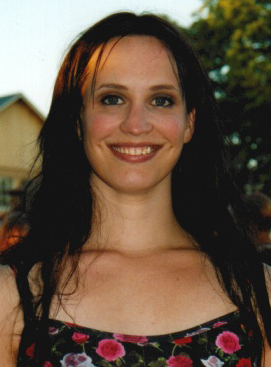
Maija Vilkkumaa (2021–2025)

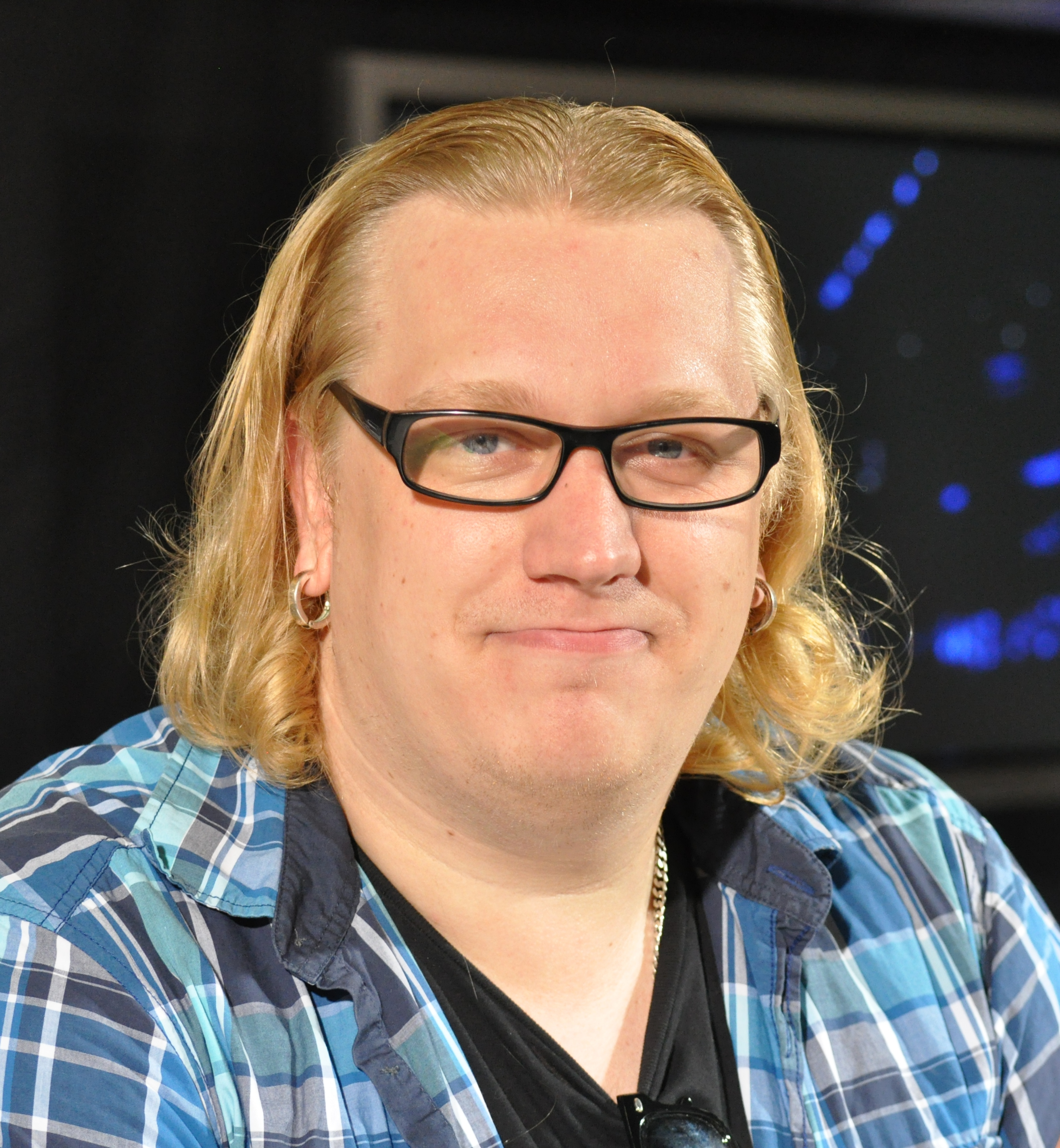
Arttu Wiskari (2024–2026)

=== Line-up of Coaches ===
Coaches' line-up by chairs order
Season	Year	Coaches			
Season	Year	1	2	3	4
1	2011	Elastinen	Lauri	Paula	Michael
2	2013	Elastinen	Lauri	Paula	Michael
3	2014	Elastinen	Mira	Anne	Michael
4	2015	Olli	Redrama	Tarja	Michael
5	2016	Olli	Redrama	Tarja	Michael
6	2017	Olli	Redrama	Anna	Michael
7	2018	Olli	Anna	Toni	Redrama
8	2019	Toni	Olli	Redrama	Anna
9	2020	Juha	Anna	Toni & Sipe	Redrama
10	2021	Maija	Toni & Sipe	Redrama	Juha
11	2022	Anna	Juha	Toni & Sipe	Maija
12	2023	Elastinen	Anna	Toni & Sipe	Maija
13	2024	Maija	Arttu	Sanni	Elastinen
14	2025	Sanni	Elastinen	Maija	Arttu
15	2026	Arttu	Sanni	Jenni	Elastinen
16	2027	Jenni	Elastinen	Sanni	Sipe

== Series overview ==
Warning: the following table presents a significant amount of different colors.

Teams color key
Artist from Team Elastinen	Artist from Team Tarja	Artist from Team Juha
Artist from Team Michael	Artist from Team Olli	Artist from Team Maija
Artist from Team Paula	Artist from Team Redrama	Artist from Team Sanni
Artist from Team Lauri	Artist from Team Anna	Artist from Team Arttu
Artist from Team Anne	Artist from Team Toni	Artist from Team Jenni
Artist from Team Mira	Artist from Team Toni & Sipe

The Voice of Finland series overview
Season	Aired	Winner	Runner-up	Third place	Fourth place	Winning coach	Presenter(s)	Backstage presenter(s)
1	2011	Mikko Sipola	Saara Aalto	Jesse Kaikuranta	Kim Koskinen	Elastinen	Axl Smith	Kristiina Komulainen
2	2013	Antti Railio	Emilia Ekström	Suvi Aalto	Ikenna Ikegwuonu	Paula Koivuniemi	Axl Smith	Tea Khalifa
3	2014	Siru Airistola	Emma Schnitt	Jussi Kari	Tuuli Okkonen	Michael Monroe	Axl Smith	Jenni Alexandrova
4	2015	Miia Kosunen	Jani Klemola	Jennie Storbacka	Jesper Anttonen	Tarja Turunen	Axl Smith	Jenni Alexandrova
5	2016	Suvi Åkerman	Riikka Jaakkola	Meri Vahtera	Ilona Gill	Tarja Turunen	Smith, Heikki Paasonen (Note: Axl Smith hosted the Blind Auditions, with Heikki Paasonen finishing the season with live shows, via Smith's departure due to personal issues.)	Jenni Alexandrova
6	2017	Saija Saarnisto	Aksel Kankaanranta	Andrea Brosio	Tiina Nyyssönen	Redrama	Heikki Paasonen	Tinni Wikström
7	2018	Jerkka Virtanen	Mia Suszko	Wanqiu Long	Fiona Krüger	Redrama	Heikki Paasonen	Elina Kottonen
8 (Note: This was the last season featuring Olli Lindholm, before he died prior to the live shows. Despite the issue, the season was finished with an empty chair in the memory of Lindholm, and the finale was played as usual with only three coaches.)	2019	Markus Salo	Jasse Jatala	Roope Palmu	Sara Jagrouny	Olli Lindholm	Heikki Paasonen	Elina Kottonen
9	2020	Juffi Seponpoika	Henry Friman	Maritza Palmroth	Etni Khan	Toni & Sipe	Heikki Paasonen	Elina Kottonen
10	2021	Kalle Virtanen	Elise-Juliette	Milla Kotilainen-Dwyer	Ira Mikkonen	Juha Tapio	Heikki Paasonen	Wikström & Kottonen
11	2022	Sussu Erkinheimo	Roosa-Maria Leppänen	Keira Lundström	Paavo Laapotti	Toni & Sipe	Heikki Paasonen	Wikström & Kottonen
12	2023	Onni Kivipelto	Eemeli Nissi	Timmy Tattari	Emmi Saunders	Toni & Sipe	Heikki Paasonen	Wikström & Kottonen
13	2024	Laura Ruusumaa	Lisa Dumchieva	Toni Taipale	Jaromir Jokinen	Elastinen	Heikki Paasonen	Wikström & Jaana Pelkonen (Note: New backstage presenter Jaana Pelkonen presented during the whole series, with Tinni Wikström joining her in the live shows.)
14	2025	Oliver Rosenholm	Janina Suihkola	Julia Janakka	Mohammad Riazat	Arttu Wiskari	Heikki Paasonen	Wikström & Jaana Pelkonen
15	2026	Jose Carlos	Kreetta Sihvola	Saw Shane	Arthur Rinne	Elastinen	Heikki Paasonen	Wikström & Jaana Pelkonen

== Coaches' results ==
Considering the final placement of the contestants who are members of their team (not the final placement of the coaches):

Coaches' results
Coach	Winner	Runner-up	Third place	Fourth place
Elastinen	Thrice (1, 13, 15)	Once (3)	Once (12)	Twice (2, 14)
Toni Wirtanen & Sipe Santapukki	Thrice (9, 11-12)	—	Once (10)	—
Redrama	Twice (6-7)	Once (10)	Twice (5, 8)	Twice (4, 9)
Tarja Turunen	Twice (4-5)	—	—	—
Michael Monroe	Once (3)	Twice (1, 5)	Thrice (2, 4, 6)	—
Olli Lindholm	Once (8)	Twice (4, 7)	—	Twice (5-6)
Juha Tapio	Once (10)	Once (9)	—	Once (11)
Paula Koivuniemi	Once (2)	—	Once (1)	—
Arttu Wiskari	Once (14)	—	—	Twice (13, 15)
Anna Puu	—	Twice (6, 12)	Twice (9, 11)	Twice (7-8)
Maija Vilkkumaa	—	Twice (11, 14)	Once (13)	Twice (10, 12)
Sanni	—	Once (13)	Twice (14-15)	—
Toni Wirtanen	—	Once (8)	Once (7)	—
Lauri Tähkä	—	Once (2)	—	Once (1)
Jenni Vartiainen	—	Once (15)	—	—
Anne Mattila	—	—	Once (3)	—
Mira Luoti	—	—	—	Once (3)

== Coaches semifinalists and finalists ==
- Winner
- Runner-up
- Third place
- Fourth place
- First names listed are the finalists: winners in **bold** and other finalists in italic.

Season	Coaches and their teams for the live shows			
1	Elastinen	Lauri Tähkä	Paula Koivuniemi	Michael Monroe
1	**Mikko Sipola**; Lauri Mikkola; Eveliina Tammenlaakso; Taru Ratilainen; Isabella Hammarsten; Karoliina Kallio	Kim Koskinen; Amanda Löfman; Antti Matikainen; Sanna Säntti; Selja Felin; Valerie Nyholm	Jesse Kaikuranta; Aki Louhela; Tanja Vähäsarja; Nelli Petro; Anfisa Proskuryakova; Sophie Aittola	Saara Aalto; Mikko Herranen; Kimmo Härmä; Toni Hiltunen; J-P Salo; Krista Siegfrids
2	Ikenna Ikegwuonu; Tomas Höglund; Inga Söder; Niina Kähönen; Jepa Lambert; Laura Savio	Emilia Ekström; Dennis Fagerström; Eve Hotti; Kaapo Kokkonen; Johanna Pekkarinen; Maria Tauriainen	**Antti Railio**; Osku Ketola; Laura Alajääski; Kirsi Lehtosaari; Reetta Kaartinen; Toni Savolainen	Suvi Aalto; Gary Revel Jr. Christian Casagrande; Jone Ullakko; Regina Chevakova; Luca Sturniolo
3	Elastinen	Mira Luoti	Anne Mattila	Michael Monroe
3	Emma Schnitt; Erik Niemi; Anni Saikku; Johanna Johnson	Tuuli Okkonen; Sofia Tarkkanen; Camilla Bäckman; Maya Kurki	Jussi Kari; Juho Schroderus; Sini Alatalo; Ville Pyykönen	**Siru Airistola**; Tiia Erämeri; Lee Angel; Roni Leppä
4	Olli Lindholm	Redrama	Tarja Turunen	Michael Monroe
4	Jani Klemola; Maria Höglund; Minna Hautakangas; Ari Puro	Jesper Anttonen; Kaisa Leskinen; Sini Järvinen; Kiia Kullberg	**Miia Kosunen**; Avin Alyasi; Paolo Ribaldini; Riina Ammesmäki	Jennie Storbacka; Kevin Stocks; Kimmo Blom; Björn Suomivuori
5	Ilona Gill; Suhyun Kim; Jessica Uussaari; Lilja Tzoulas	Meri Vahtera; Anna Karlsson; Alex Ikonen; Margarita Kondakova	**Suvi Åkerman**; Ilari Hämäläinen; Kerttu Suonpää; Alisa Manninen	Riikka Jaakkola; Tuomas Junnikkala; Daniel Sanz; Jarkko Kujanpää
6	Olli Lindholm	Redrama	Anna Puu	Michael Monroe
6	Tiina Nyyssönen; A-J. Keskinen; Seungjae Kim; Emmi Bodganoff	**Saija Saarnisto**; Juuso Vuorinen; Mariia Kharlamova; Saija Saarinen	Aksel Kankaanranta; Anna Ijäs; Viola Pöyhönen; Jessica Timgren-Forss	Andrea Brosio; Sara Kurkola; Victoria Shuudifonya; Plamen de la Bona
7	Olli Lindholm	Redrama	Anna Puu	Toni Wirtanen
7	Mia Suszko; Elli Tolkki; Viivi Sopanen; Roberto Brandão	**Jerkka Virtanen**; Odee Equere; Teija Vaara; Eveliina Määttä	Fiona Kruger; Iida Yli-Mäenpää; Jenna Schleifer; Francis Asis	Wanqiu Long; Saija Väisänen; Bertta Seppälä; Taneli Läykki
8	**Markus Salo**; Linda Smirnova; Veera Vento; Wilma Avanto	Roope Palmu; Joli Malki; Oliver Briny; Riitta Piirainen	Sara Jagrouny; Jhayden Aleo; Astrid Nicole; Ilkka Lipasti	Jasse Jatala; Sarina Kettunen; Lilian Young; Rafaela Truda
9	Juha Tapio	Anna Puu	Toni & Sipe	Redrama
9	Henry Friman; Aada Adaya; Karla Lamminheimo; Sandra Dovalo	Maritza Palmroth; Emilia Alm; Meri Jämsen; Veikko Paasi	**Juffi Seponpoika**; Emilia Virlander; Matias Nissinen; Sanna Solanterä	Etni Khan; Matilda Aliina; Jessica Tünn; Noora Karppanen
10	Maija Vilkkumaa	Toni & Sipe	Redrama	Juha Tapio
10	Ira Mikkonen; Victoria Lindqvist; Antti Arvola; Indra Ramirez	Milla Kotilainen-Dwyer; Nisse Nordling; Jenny Grönthal; Jocke Levälampi	Elise-Juliette; Susanna Wendelin; Robin Alexander; Sissi Uotinen	**Kalle Virtanen**; Clarissa Grönstrand; Siret Tuula; Jouni Soininen; Walle Wahlsten
11	Anna Puu	Juha Tapio	Toni & Sipe	Maija Vilkkumaa
11	Keira Lundström; Vertti Jokela; Aino Mero; Bella May	Paavo Laapotti; Aleksi Aromaa; Anastasia Pesheva; Olga Wilhelmiina	**Sussu Erkinheimo**; Pyry Lintunen; Argjenda Aliu; Sonja Lindberg	Roosa-Maria Leppänen; Daniel Mason; Anniina Henttonen; Matleena Junttanen
12	Elastinen	Anna Puu	Toni & Sipe	Maija Vilkkumaa
12	Timmy Tattari; Aku Keinonen; Sara Paakkari; Sarlotta Soininen	Eemeli Nissi; Alina Kolehmainen; Antti Alatörmänen; Daisy Bolt	**Onni Kivipelto**; Heikki Pöyhiä; Erika Nyström; Jenny Mulenga	Emmi Saunders; Arto Pesonen; Jami Kontturi; Veli-Pekka Vaari
13	Maija Vilkkumaa	Arttu Wiskari	Sanni	Elastinen
13	Toni Taipale; Heidi Simelius; Eetu-Pekka Heiskanen; Sanna Peltomäki	Jaromir Jokinen; Helmi Tammenpää; Juho Väliaho; Mira Taskinen	Lisa Dumchieva; Tina Sandqvist; Isabel Chikoti; Markus Perttula	**Laura Ruusumaa**; Marko Turunen; Chrisu Romberg; Yannick Schuurmans
14	Janina Suihkola; Risto Piirainen; Hanna Kanasuo; Johanna Sandell	**Oliver Rosenholm**; Rosita Mäntyniemi; Olli Hartonen; Tatu Tossavainen	Julia Janakka; Adele Okkonen; Jimmy Martin; Tais Delia	Mohammad Riazat; Rosa Kumar Saarinen; Arttu Kauppinen; Oliver Hurrell
15	Arttu Wiskari	Sanni	Jenni Vartiainen	Elastinen
15	Arthur Rinne; Dorcas Lusajo; Merette Brandt; Viivi-Maria Grosvenor	Saw Shane; Onni Hytönen; Flora Ann Heinäsuo; Kristian Meurman	Kreetta Sihvola; Jaakko Seppälä; Tara Hasan; Ehea Kunelius-Laukkanen	**Jose Carlos**; Justiina Luukaslammi; Selma Lepistö; Leeni Pihlakoski

== Season synopses ==
=== Season 1 (2011–12) ===
The first season premiered on Nelonen on 30 December 2011 and the final was on 20 April 2012. The winner of the series was Mikko Sipola from coach Elastinen's team.

Performer	Song	Result
Mikko Sipola	"Stuck Inside My Head"	Winner
Saara Aalto	"My Love"	Runner-up
Jesse Kaikuranta	"Vie mut kotiin"	3rd/4th place
Kim Koskinen	"Särkyneiden tie"	3rd/4th place

=== Season 2 (2013) ===
The second season premiered on Nelonen on 4 January 2013, the final being broadcast on 26 April 2013. The winner of the second season was Antti Railio from Paula Koivuniemi's team.

Performer	Song	Result
Antti Railio	"Sulava jää"	Winner
Emilia Ekström	"Askel askeleelta"	Runner-up
Suvi Aalto	"Kuuntelen"	3rd/4th place
Ike Ikegwuonu	"Vaiheillaan"	3rd/4th place

For this season, The Voice of Finland introduced Kotivalmentaja (HomeCoach) mobile game for Apple iOS and Android phones.

=== Season 3 (2014) ===
The third season premiered on Nelonen on 3 January 2014, the final being broadcast on 18 April 2014. The winner of the third season was Siru Airistola from Michael Monroe's team.

Performer	Song	Result
Siru Airistola	"Sä et kulu pois"	Winner
Emma Schnitt	"Älä pelkää"	Runner-up
Jussi Kari	"Suu & Pää"	3rd/4th place
Tuuli Okkonen	"Pysähdytään Pariisiin"	3rd/4th place

=== Season 4 (2015) ===
The fourth season premiered on Nelonen on 2 January 2015. The winner of the fourth season was Miia Kosunen from Tarja Turunen's team.

Performer	Song	Result
Miia Kosunen	"Bed of Fire"	Winner
Jani Klemola	"Sinä ansaitset kultaa"	Runner-up
Jennie Storbacka	"Mamma Knows"	3rd place
Jesper Anttonen	"All of Me"	4th place

=== Season 5 (2016) ===
The fifth season premiered on Nelonen on 8 January 2016. The winner of the fifth season was Suvi Åkerman from Tarja Turunen's team.

Performer	Song	Result
Suvi Åkerman	"It's Not the End of the World"	Winner
Riikka Jaakkola	"Don't Ask Me"	Runner-up
Meri Vahtera	"Tuulee"	3rd place
Ilona Gill	"Oneway Trip"	4th place

=== Season 6 (2017) ===
The sixth season premiered on Nelonen on 6 January 2017. The winner of the sixth season was Saija Saarnisto from Redrama's team.

Performer	Song	Result
Saija Saarnisto	"Mä annan sut pois"	Winner
Aksel Kankaanranta	"Thinking Out Loud"	Runner-up
Andrea Brosio	"I Will Stay"	3rd place
Tiina Nyyssönen	"Polte"	4th place

=== Season 7 (2018) ===
The seventh season premiered on Nelonen in January 2018. The winner of the seventh season was Jerkka Virtanen from Redrama's team.

Performer	Songs	Result
Jerkka Virtanen	"Skin", "Is This Love"	Winner
Mia Suszko	""	Runner-up
Wanqiu Long	""	3rd place
Fiona Kruger	""	4th place

=== Season 8 (2019) ===
The eighth season premiered on Nelonen in January 2019. The winner of the eighth season was Markus Salo from Olli Lindholm's Team

Performer	Songs	Result
Markus Salo	"Minne tuulet vie", "Kylmä ilman sua"	Winner
Jasse Jatala	""	Runner-up
Roope Palmu	""	3rd place
Sara Jagrouny	""	4th place

=== Season 9 (2020) ===
The ninth season premiered on Nelonen in January 2020. The winner of the ninth season was Juffi Seponpoika from Toni Wirtanen's & Sipe Santapukki's Team

Performer	Songs	Result
Juffi Seponpoika	"Brothers in Arms", "I Will Always Love You"	Winner
Henry Friman	""	Runner-up
Maritza Palmroth	""	3rd place
Etni Chan	""	4th place

=== Season 10 (2021) ===
The tenth season premiered on Nelonen in January 2021. The winner of the tenth season was Kalle Virtanen from Juha Tapio's Team

Performer	Songs	Result
Kalle Virtanen	"A Whiter Shade of Pale", "Who Wants to Live Forever"	Winner
Elise-Juliette	"Am I Wrong”, “Säännöt Rakkaudelle”	Runner-up
Milla Kotilainen-Dwyer	"Lähtisitkö”, “Kootava Lasinen Muurahaispesä”	3rd place
Ira Mikkonen	"Me Ei Olla Enää Me”, “Villejä Lupiineja”	4th place

=== Season 11 (2022) ===
The eleventh season premiered on Nelonen in January 2022. The winner of the eleventh season was Sussu Erkinheimo from Toni Wirtanen's & Sipe Santapukki's Team

Performer	Songs	Result
Sussu Erkinheimo	"Hymne à l'amour", "Woman in Love"	Winner
Paavo Laapotti	"Careless Whisper", "Run to the Hills"	Runner-up
Keira Lundström	"Rise Up", "Break My Heart"	3rd place
Roosa-Maria Leppänen	"Bang Bang", "Päästä varpaisiin"	4th place

=== Season 12 (2023) ===
The twelfth season premiered on Nelonen in January 2023. The winner of the twelfth season was Onni Kivipelto from Toni Wirtanen's & Sipe Santapukki's Team

Performer	Songs	Result
Onni Kivipelto	"Lentäjän poika", "I Want to Know What Love Is"	Winner
Eemeli Nissi	"Tequila", "Supersankari"	Runner-up
Timmy Tattari	"Train Wreck", "Missä muruseni on"	3rd place
Emmi Saunders	"Toiset mimmit", "Dancing on My Own"	4th place

=== Season 13 (2024) ===
The thirteenth season premiered on Nelonen in January 2024. The winner of the thirteenth season was Laura Ruusumaa from Elastinen's team.

Performer	Songs	Result
Laura Ruusumaa	"All by Myself", "Nemo"	Winner
Lisa Dumchieva	"Total Eclipse of the Heart", "The Winner Takes It All"	Runner-up
Toni Taipale	"Pettävällä jäällä", "Eloon!"	3rd place
Jaromir Jokinen	"Pidä huolta", "Suojelusenkeli"	4th place

=== Season 14 (2025) ===
The fourteenth season premiered on Nelonen in January 2025. The winner of the fourteenth season was Oliver Rosenholm from Arttu Wiskari's team.

Performer	Songs	Result
Oliver Rosenholm	"Surujen kitara", "The Phantom of the Opera"	Winner
Janina Suihkola	"Over the Hills and Far Away", "Wuthering Heights"	Runner-up
Julia Janakka	"Supersankari", "Stand My Ground"	3rd place
Mohammad Riazat	"'O sole mio", "Can't Help Falling in Love"	4th place

== Kids version ==
The Voice Kids was a Finnish reality singing competition for contestants aged 8 to 14, based on the Dutch show of the same name. Serving as the children's version of The Voice of Finland, the competition proceeded as well as in the adult counterpart, with the Blind audition, the Battles and live performances, the semi-finals and finally the finals.

The coaches included The Voice of Finland's coach Elastinen, PMMP's singer Mira Luoti and The Voice season 1 semi-finalist Krista Siegfrids. In season 2 Arttu Wiskari and Idols winner Diandra replaced Elastinen and Luoti.

The first season was won by 14-year-old Molly Rosenström. The second season was won by 13-year-old Aino Morko.

=== Coaches' timeline ===
Coach	Seasons	
Coach	1	2
Krista Siegfrids		
Elastinen		
Mira Luoti		
Diandra		
Arttu Wiskari		

=== Series overview ===
Finnish The Voice Kids series overview
Season	First aired	Last aired	Winner	Runners-up		Winning coach	Presenters	Coaches (chairs' order)		
Season	First aired	Last aired	Winner	Runners-up		Winning coach	Presenters	1	2	3
1	1 Sep 2013	10 Nov 2013	Molly Rosenström	Viivi Korhonen	Viktorio Angelov	Krista Siegfrids	Axl Smith, Tea Khalifa	Mira	Krista	Elastinen
2	30 Aug 2014	15 Nov 2014	Aino Morko	Helmi Hollström	Frida Odrischinsky	Krista Siegfrids	Axl Smith, Tea Khalifa	Krista	Diandra	Arttu

== All-Stars version ==
After the successful tenth anniversary season of The Voice of Finland, the show announced through Instagram and other social media platforms that they would be broadcasting an All-Star version in the autumn season. It is the second to acquire the rights after the French version. The show will be joined by former contestants from previous seasons.

=== Coaches' timeline ===
Coach	Season
Coach	1
Elastinen	
Tarja Turunen	
Michael Monroe	

=== Series overview ===
The Voice of Finland: All-Stars series overview
Season	First aired	Last aired	Winner	Runner-up	Third place	Winning coach	Presenter	Coaches (chairs' order)		
Season	First aired	Last aired	Winner	Runner-up	Third place	Winning coach	Presenter	1	2	3
1	28 Aug 2021	2 Oct 2021	Andrea Brosio	Fiona Krüger	Jesse Kaikuranta	Michael Monroe	Heikki Paasonen	Elastinen	Tarja	Michael

== Senior version ==
=== Coaches' timeline ===
Coach	Season
Coach	1
Michael Monroe	
Ressu Redford	
Tarja Turunen	

=== Series overview ===
Finnish The Voice Senior series overview
Season	First aired	Last aired	Winner	Runner-up	Third place	Winning coach	Presenter	Backstage presenter	Coaches (chairs' order)		
Season	First aired	Last aired	Winner	Runner-up	Third place	Winning coach	Presenter	Backstage presenter	1	2	3
1	20 May 2022	10 Jun 2022	Jaska Mäkynen	Caron Barnes	Leena Hästbacka	Tarja Turunen	Heikki Paasonen	Elina Kottonen	Michael	Ressu	Tarja
