= Mattila =

Mattila is a Finnish surname. Notable people with the surname include:

- Anne Mattila (born 1984), Finnish singer and painter
- Erkka Mattila (born 1946), Finnish rower
- Hanna-Leena Mattila (born 1968), Finnish politician
- Jaakko Mattila (born 1976), Finnish painter
- Jarno Mattila (born 1984), Finnish footballer
- Kalevi Mattila (1934–2022), Finnish politician
- Karita Mattila (born 1960), Finnish operatic soprano
- Leo Mattila (1923–1979), Finnish racing driver, business executive and politician
- Matti Mattila (1912–1990), Finnish agronomist, farmer and politician
- Mikko Mattila (born 1953), Finnish sports shooter
- Olavi J. Mattila (1918–2013), Finnish Trade and Industry Ministry official
- Pekka Mattila (born 1967), Finnish footballer
- Pertti Mattila (born 1948), Finnish mathematician
- Pertti Mattila (skier) (1909–1998), Finnish skier
- Pete Mattila (born 1981), American-born blacksmith, artist and sculptor
- Petri Mattila (born 1970), Finnish ice hockey coach
- Pirkko Mattila (born 1964), Finnish politician
- Risto Mattila (born 1981), Finnish snowboarder
- Risto Mattila (athlete) (1909–1990), Finnish sprinter
- Sakari Mattila (born 1989), Finnish footballer
- Topi Mattila (born 1946), Finnish ski jumper
- Veera Mattila (born 2003), Finnish track and field athlete
- Veikko Mattila (1912–1983), Finnish Lutheran pastor and politician
- Ville Mattila (1903–1987), Finnish cross country skier
