= Shooting at the 1984 Summer Olympics – Men's 50 metre rifle three positions =

Sports shooting at the Olympics

Men's 50 metre rifle three positions at the Games of the XXIII Olympiad
- Venue: Los Angeles, United States
- Date: August 1, 1984
- Competitors: 51 from 29 nations

Medalists
1st place, gold medalist(s)		Malcolm Cooper	Great Britain
2nd place, silver medalist(s)		Daniel Nipkow	Switzerland
3rd place, bronze medalist(s)		Alister Allan	Great Britain

The men's 50 metre rifle three positions event was a shooting sports event held as part of the Shooting at the 1984 Summer Olympics programme. The competition was held on August 1, 1984, at the shooting ranges in Los Angeles. 51 shooters from 29 nations competed.

== Results ==
Place	Shooter	Total
1	Malcolm Cooper (GBR)	1173
2	Daniel Nipkow (SUI)	1163
3	Alister Allan (GBR)	1162
4	Kurt Hillenbrand (FRG)	1154
5	Bo Lilja (DEN)	1153
6	Glenn Dubis (USA)	1151
7	Jean-Pierre Amat (FRA)	1150
8	Peter Heinz (FRG)	1150
9	Bob Cheyne (CAN)	1149
10	Michel Bury (FRA)	1147
11T	John Duus (NOR)	1146
11T	Jorge González (ESP)	1146
11T	Roger Jansson (SWE)	1146
14	Harald Stenvaag (NOR)	1145
15T	Edward Etzel (USA)	1142
15T	Mauri Röppänen (FIN)	1142
17T	Christian Heller (SWE)	1141
17T	Goran Maksimović (YUG)	1141
17T	Alan Smith (AUS)	1141
20T	Rajmond Debevec (YUG)	1140
20T	Constantin Stan (ROU)	1140
22T	Lothar Heinrich (AUT)	1139
22T	Xu Xiaoguang (CHN)	1139
24	Jean-François Sénécal (CAN)	1138
25	Ryohei Koba (JPN)	1137
26T	Gerhard Krimbacher (AUT)	1135
26T	Mikko Mattila (FIN)	1135
26T	Ignatios Psyllakis (GRE)	1135
29	Ulrich Sarbach (SUI)	1132
30T	José Álvarez (MEX)	1128
30T	José María Pigrau (ESP)	1128
32T	Lin Jicheng (CHN)	1127
32T	Yun Deok-Ha (KOR)	1127
34	Ricardo Rusticucci (ARG)	1126
35	Kaoru Matsuo (JPN)	1125
36	Mohamed Jbour (JOR)	1122
37	Jack Achilles (NED)	1120
38	Víctor Garcés (MEX)	1119
39T	Lee Eun-Cheol (KOR)	1117
39T	Itzhak Yonassi (ISR)	1117
41T	Pelopidas Iliadis (GRE)	1114
41T	Chakrapan Theinthong (THA)	1114
43	Dennis Hardman (ZIM)	1101
44T	Mario Clopatofsky (COL)	1100
44T	Manop Leeprasansakul (THA)	1100
46	Yair Davidovitz (ISR)	1099
47	Hussam Abdul Rahman (JOR)	1095
48	Abdul Latif Al-Bulushi (OMA)	1084
49	Pasquale Raschi (SMR)	1074
50	Dadallah Al-Bulushi (OMA)	1050
51	Alfredo Pelliccioni (SMR)	1041
