= Irina Saari =

Finnish singer

Irina
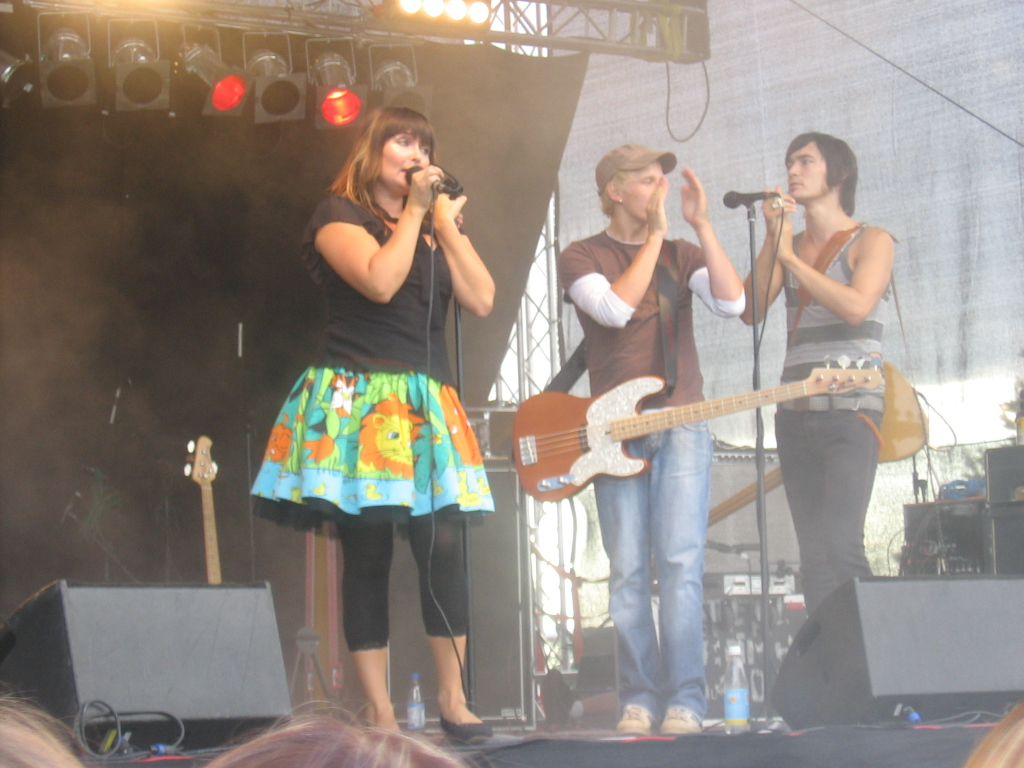
- Irina at Tuiskurock, Nivala 2006

Background information
- Born: 10 May 1975 (age 51)
- Genres: Pop,
- Years active: 2004–present
- Label: EMI Finland
- Website: Official website

Irina Saari (née Lahtinen, born on 10 May 1975 in Kauhajoki), better known by her stage name Irina, is a Finnish singer. Her style is pop and suomirock. She currently lives in Heinola.

All of the songs on Irina's debut album were written by Toni Wirtanen of Apulanta except for the cover song "Katujen kuningatar" ("Queen of the Streets"). For some of the lyrics in the songs, she is noted as a co-writer. For her second album Älä riko kaavaa (Don't Mess With the Formula), Knipi and Ville Pusa contributed to the songwriting in addition to Wirtanen. Irina wrote all of the lyrics for her third album.

In 2005, Irina received Emma awards for best new pop artist of the year and debut album of the year.

Irina has mentioned that her favourite artists are Coldplay, Foo Fighters, Sting, Robbie Williams, Harry Connick Jr., Egotrippi and Rangaistuspotku.

During her career, Irina has sold over 150,000 certified records in Finland, which places her among the top 30 of the best-selling female soloists in Finland.

== Career ==
Before her first album, Irina was in the music business for about a decade. She toured for six years in a band called Playa, played both in rock bars and nightclubs and sang everything from Finnish pop to rock and soul. She was also a member of the so-called therapy band Redux.

In August 2002, her friend Toni Wirtanen asked her to sing a song he wrote for a television series. The song was for the show Juulian totuudet ("Juulia's Truths"). After the project ended, Wirtanen and Irina decided to continue to work together and did the songs "Öiden kruunu" ("The Crown of the Nights") and "Hiirenloukku" ("Mousetrap"). In autumn of the same year, the songwriting continued and out of these songs came Irina's debut album.

The performance of her first album was on 17 March 2005 in Lahti. The album, Vahva (Strong), came out on 22 March 2004 and it stayed in the Finnish charts for 24 weeks. A gold edition of this album came out in October 2004 which had two previously unreleased songs.

Her second album, Älä riko kaavaa, was released on 26 October 2005. Her third album, Liiba laaba, was released on 28 March 2007 and sold gold.

== Band ==
The members of Irina's band are:

- Antti Pitkäjärvi (keyboards, vocals, guitar)
- Janne Kasurinen (guitar)
- Miika Colliander (guitar)
- Jussi Saxlin (bass, vocals)
- J Salonen (drums)

== Discography ==
=== Albums ===
- Vahva (22 March 2004) – FIN #6; (platinum)
- Älä riko kaavaa (26 October 2005) – FIN #5; (platinum)
- Liiba laaba (28 March 2007) -FIN #1; (platinum)
- Miten valmiiksi tullaan (14 October 2009)
- Askeleita (March 2013) – FIN #4

=== Singles ===
- "Juulian totuudet" (2002) (promo)
- "Vastaukset" (23 February 2003)
- "Vahva" (2004)
- "Kuurupiiloa" (2004) (promo)
- "Katujen kuningatar" (2004)
- "Älä sano mitään" (31 August 2005)
- "Hiljaisuus" (25 January 2006)
- "Kymmenen kirosanaa" (2006)
- "Älä riko kaavaa" (2006) (promo)
- "Pokka" (2007) (promo)
- "Miksi hänkin on täällä" (2007)
- "Selkä selkää vasten" (2007) (promo)
- "Liiba laaba" (2008) (promo)
- "Et huomaa" (13 July 2009 – promo)
- "Näe minut tässä" (2009 – promo)
- "Jälki" (2010 – Promo)
- "Kunnon syy" (featuring Maija Vilkkumaa, 2010)

=== Music videos ===
- "Juulian totuudet"
- "Vahva" (directed by: Miika Saksi, assistant director: Tommi Karvinen)
- "Hiljaisuus"
- "Kymmenen kirosanaa"
- "Pokka"
- "Miksi hänkin on täällä"
- "Näe minut tässä" (directed by: Tuukka Temonen)
- "Jälki"
- "Kunnon Syy" (directed by: Misko Iho)
