= Duus =

Duus is a Danish surname. It is possibly the name for several noble lineages in Denmark. However, one can be traced back to a diploma, given in 1258 to Borchadus & Hartwicus Dus, brothers and knights in the Duchy of Holstein. However, a Niels Mandorp Duus is also mentioned in 1315.

Notable people with this surname include:

- Bryony Duus (born 1977), Australian football player and coach
- Christian Duus (born 1974), Danish football player
- Gordon Duus (born 1954), American environmental attorney
- Jesper Duus (born 1967), Danish ice hockey player
- John Duus (1906-1991), English athlete
- John Duus (sport shooter) (born 1955), Norwegian sport shooter
