= Sipe Santapukki =

Finnish musician (born 1977)

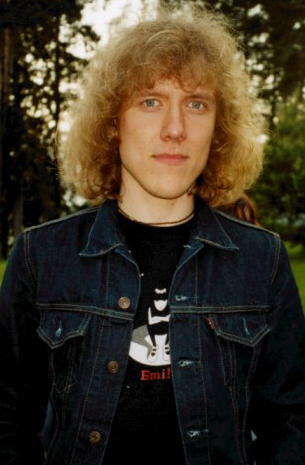

Background information
- Born: Simo Johannes Santapukki; December 20, 1977 (age 48); Lahti, Finland
- Genres: Rock
- Instrument: Drums
- Years active: 1991–present
- Member of: Apulanta

Simo "Sipe" Johannes Santapukki (born 20 December 1977) is a Finnish musician, best known as the drummer for rock band Apulanta. Santapukki graduated from the Lyseonmäki upper secondary school in Heinola. He joined Apulanta in 1991, making him one of the early members.

In 2002, Sipe released his eponymous album featuring numerous notable Finnish singers such as Gösta Sundqvist, Tommi Liimatta, Timo Rautiainen and Hannu Sallinen, as well as Sipe's former girlfriend Anna Eriksson.

Santapukki is a big fan of motor sports. In 2004 he won the silver medal in the Finnish Formula 3. Santapukki's art exhibition Narrilaivan kapteeni (Captain of the Ship of Fools) was held in Heinola in 2003.

In 2020 Santapukki became a judge on The Voice of Finland alongside bandmate Toni Wirtanen.

== Early life ==
Santapukki was born 20 December 1977 in Lahti, Finland.

== Discography ==
- Sipe -CD (2002)

Tilatkaa tytöt taksi / Häiriintynyt kuu / Kultaiset valheet / Viiksikset / Kuparihaka / Aika jättää / Tänään / Narrilaivan kapteeni / Jalostettua turhamaisuutta / Seurataan johtajaa

=== Singles ===
- Häiriintynyt kuu (2002)

Häiriintynyt kuu / Tiiliseinää

- Seurataan johtajaa (2002)

Seurataan johtajaa (radio edit) / Seurataan johtajaa / Ritari Q
