= Donald Durbin =

American sports shooter

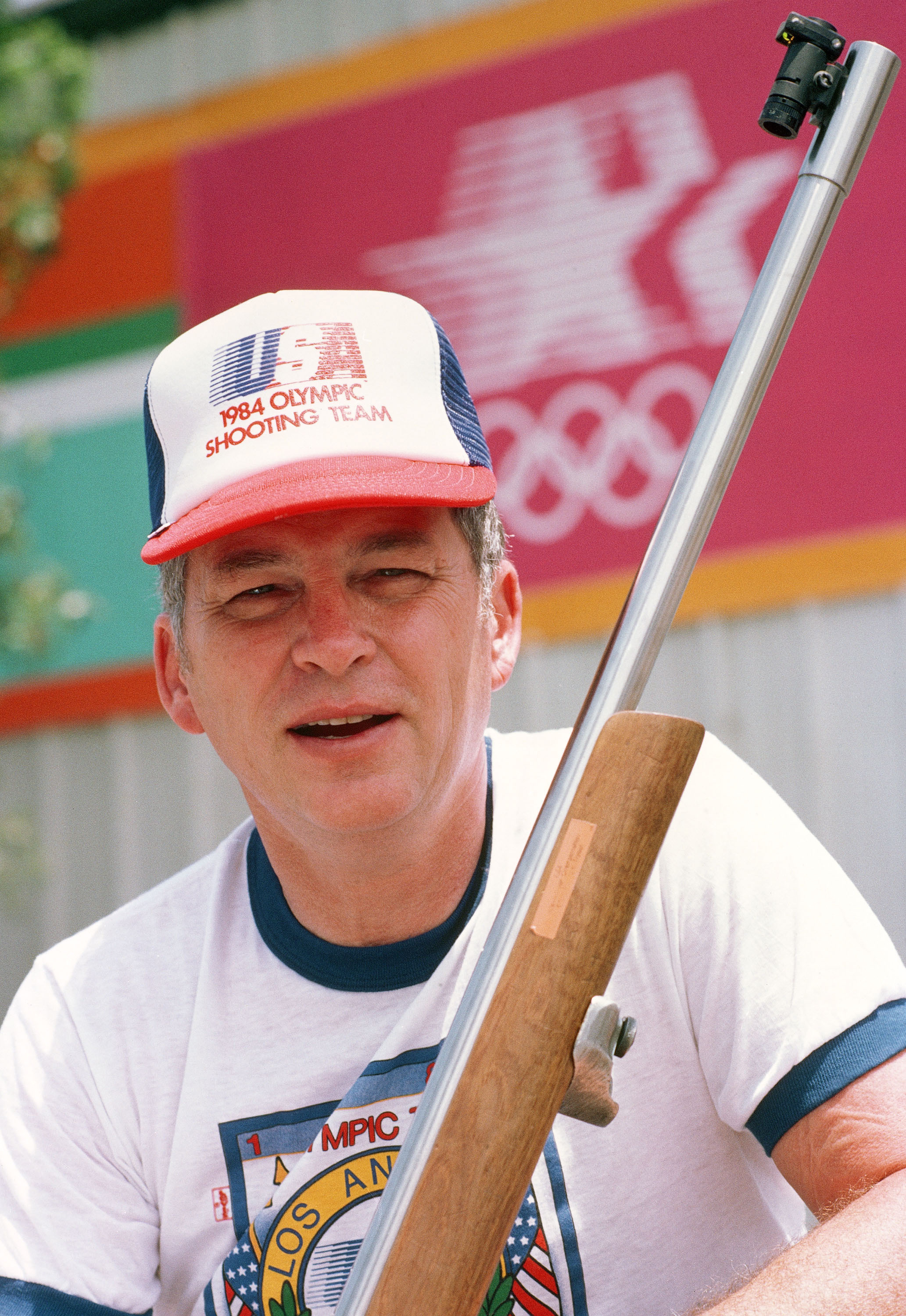
- Durbin in 1984

Personal information
- Nationality: American
- Born: November 28, 1936 (age 89) New Albany, Indiana, United States

Sport
- Sport: Sports shooting

Donald Durbin (born November 28, 1936) is an American sports shooter. He competed in the men's 50 metre rifle, prone event at the 1984 Summer Olympics.
