= Chakrapan Theinthong =

Thai sports shooter

Personal information
- Nationality: Thai
- Born: 9 April 1961 (age 63)

Sport
- Sport: Sports shooting

Chakrapan Theinthong (born 9 April 1961) is a Thai sports shooter. He competed in the men's 50 metre rifle three positions event at the 1984 Summer Olympics.
