= Daniel Nipkow =

Swiss sport shooter (born 1954)

Personal information
- Nationality: Swiss
- Born: 14 March 1954 (age 72)

Sport
- Sport: Shooting
Medal record
Men's shooting
Representing Switzerland
Olympic Games
| Silver medal – second place | 1984 Los Angeles | 50 m Rifle Three Positions |

Daniel Nipkow (born 14 March 1954) is a Swiss sport shooter. He won a silver medal in 50 metre rifle three positions at the 1984 Summer Olympics in Los Angeles, competing for the Switzerland (SUI) national team.
