= Robert Zedwane =

Canadian sports shooter

Personal information
- Born: 1 May 1942 (age 82); Montreal, Quebec, Canada

Sport
- Sport: Sports shooting

Robert Zedwane (born 1 May 1942) is a Canadian sports shooter. He competed in the men's 50 metre rifle, prone event at the 1984 Summer Olympics. He was also a Canadian national champion.
