= Jose Medina (sport shooter) =

Filipino sports shooter

Personal information
- Nationality: Filipino
- Born: 11 July 1942 (age 83)

Sport
- Sport: Sports shooting

Jose Medina (born 11 July 1942) is a Filipino sports shooter. He competed in the men's 50 metre rifle, prone event at the 1984 Summer Olympics.
