= Hans Strand =

Swedish landscape photographer and former Olympic sports shooter

- Born: 29 November 1955 (age 70); Marmaverken, Sweden
- Occupation: Landscape photographer

Hans Strand (born 29 November 1955) is a Swedish landscape photographer and former sports shooter. He is internationally recognized for his large-format and aerial photography, depicting both pristine wilderness and landscapes shaped by human activity. Strand has published numerous books and received multiple awards, including the prestigious Hasselblad Master Award in 2008.

== Biography ==
Strand was born in Marmaverken, Sweden, in 1955. He initially pursued a career in mechanical engineering and worked for nine years before deciding to become a full-time photographer in 1990. His passion for photography began during a trip to California in 1981, where he shot his first rolls of film in Yosemite National Park.

== Photography career ==
Strand’s work spans polar deserts, rainforests, mountains, and agricultural landscapes. His early focus was on untouched wilderness, but in recent years he has explored human impact on ecosystems, including water pollution and large-scale farming patterns. He is known for aerial photography, having spent over 120 hours shooting from helicopters and airplanes, particularly in Iceland.

His style emphasizes composition and tonal accuracy over dramatic lighting, often preferring overcast conditions for their subtlety. Strand’s photographs have been exhibited internationally and published in leading photography magazines.

=== Awards ===
Strand has won thirteen international awards. The most notable is the Hasselblad Master Award (2008), one of the industry’s most prestigious honors. He has also received recognition from ND Awards and other global competitions.

=== Books ===
Strand has published at least ten books, often focusing on water, abstraction, and Nordic landscapes:

- AQUA – Exploring water in all its states.
- Beyond Landscape (2021) – Intimate landscapes and abstractions.
- Island – 23 years photographing Iceland, including aerial perspectives.
- Man Made Land – Examining human impact on ecosystems.
- Iceland: Above and Below – Aerial and ground-level views of Iceland.
- Intimate Landscapes – Close-up studies of textures and details.
- Grand Landscapes – Panoramic views from diverse regions.
- Året runt: det svenska vädret, naturen och årstiderna – Swedish seasonal nature.
- Så länge skogen växer – On the significance of forests.
- And the Sea Never Rests – The life cycle of water.

== Sports shooting ==
Before his photography career, Strand represented Sweden in the 1984 Summer Olympics in Los Angeles, competing in the men's 50 metre rifle prone event.

== Personal life ==
Strand lives in Hägersten, a suburb of Stockholm, with his wife Carina and a daughter. He is passionate about classical music and Burgundy wines.
