= Kiila =

Studio album by Apulanta
- Released: March 16, 2005
- Recorded: May 2004 – January 2005
- Genre: Rock
- Length: 40:32
- Label: Levy-Yhtiö (FIN)

Apulanta chronology
Hiekka (2002)	Kiila (2005)	Eikä Vielä Ole Edes Ilta (2007)

Kiila (English: Wedge) is the eighth studio album by Finnish rock band Apulanta. It was released on March 16, 2005, by Levy-Yhtiö. Some tracks on the album feature violin. Sung in Finnish, the album reached gold certification status on the day of its release.

== Track listing ==
1. "Syöpä" (Cancer) - 04:01
2. "Pala siitä" (A Piece From It) - 03:31
3. "Pahempi toistaan" (Worse Than The Other) - 05:09
4. "Valon juuri" (Light's Root) - 4:13
5. "Armo" (Mercy) - 4:19
6. "Usko" (Faith) - 4:02
7. "Kuollakseen elossa" (Dying to Live) - 3:50
8. "Routa" (Frost) - 4:34
9. "Laululintu" (Songbird) - 3:16
10. "Kaukaa lähelle" (From Far to Close) - 3:37

== Personnel ==
- Toni Wirtanen: Vocals and guitar
- Simo "Sipe" Santapukki: Drums
- Sami Lehtinen: Bass guitar
- Emppu Vuorinen (from Nightwish): Guitar on "Kaukaa lähelle"
- Anssi Tikanmäki: String arrangements

== Charts ==
In the twelfth week of 2005, the album debuted at number one in Finland, staying there for just one week, before dropping to number two. After 28 weeks, in the thirty-ninth week of 2005, it finally dropped out of the charts from number 31. This makes it Apulanta's most successful studio album in Finland (a singles compilation collection released in 1998 also stayed in the charts for 28 weeks).

On the day of its release the album had already been given "Gold" certification. Before the end of 2005 it had sold 50,000 copies in Finland meaning that it was "Platinum" certified as well. It is Apulanta's best selling studio album.

== Singles ==
Two singles were released from the album. "Pahempi toistaan" was released in the ninth week of 2005 (three weeks before the album), reached number one in the Finnish charts and stayed in the charts for 15 weeks. "Armo" was released in the thirty-ninth week of 2005 and debuted at number one, staying there for just one week as well, and staying in the charts for 10 weeks. Both singles were regularly played on Finnish radio stations.
