= Mario Clopatofsky =

Colombian sports shooter

Personal information
- Full name: Mario Clopatofsky Velasco
- Nationality: Colombian
- Born: 18 January 1958 (age 67)

Sport
- Sport: Sports shooting

Mario Clopatofsky Velasco (born 18 January 1958) is a Colombian former sports shooter. He competed in the men's 50 metre rifle three positions event at the 1984 Summer Olympics.
