= Axl Smith =

Finnish television presenter

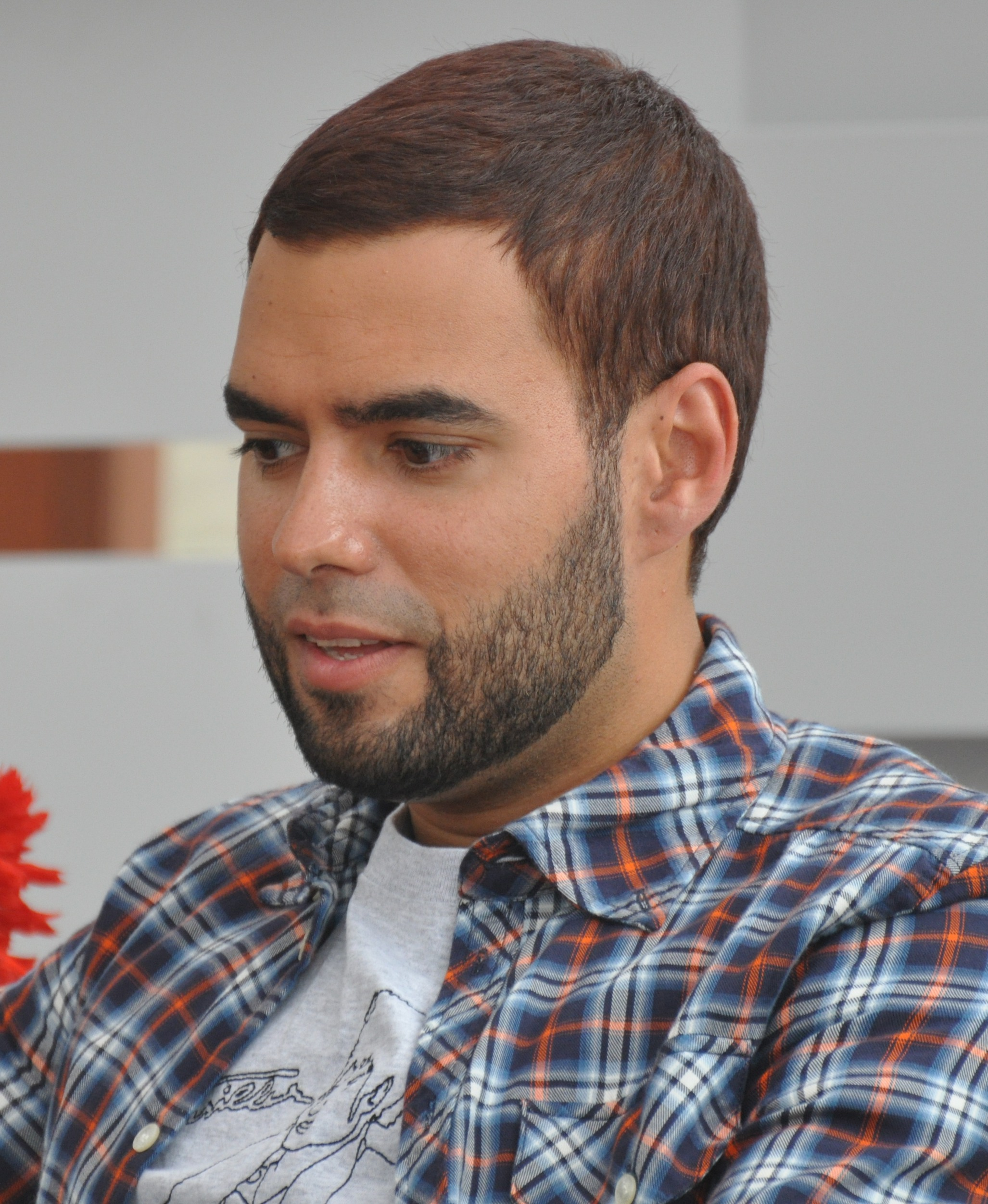
- Smith in 2012
- Born: Caro Axel Smith; 10 March 1984 (age 42); Helsinki, Finland
- Other names: Cas Smith, Cas Malek-Smith
- Occupations: Entertainer, talk show host, recording artist

Caro Axel "Axl" Smith (born 10 March 1984) is a Finnish former television presenter and entertainer. He was a host for MTV Nordic since 2004, a UNICEF Good Will Ambassador from 2006 to 2016 and a recording artist since 2010. He has hosted So You Think You Can Dance Finland in 2010, The Voice of Finland from 2011 to 2016 and The Voice Kids Finland from 2012 to 2014. He was also the Finnish voice of Kristoff in the animated film Frozen. His career as a presenter ended after it came public that he had been secretly filming his sexual partners and had shared a sexually explicit picture and a video of his friend in a WhatsApp group.

== Early life ==
Smith was born to an Iranian father and a Finnish mother. His surname comes from his American stepfather, whom his mother married when Smith was young. His maternal grandparents are Swedish.

== Controversy ==
On 1 March 2016, Smith was taken by police for questioning regarding allegations on having an undeclared video surveillance system in his one bedroom apartment. It was later revealed that the police were suspecting Smith of filming dozens of women without their consent during sexual intercourse. Due to the media attention, Smith resigned from The Voice of Finland and from his duties as a UNICEF Goodwill Ambassador.

Smith had posted a picture and a video containing sexual material to a WhatsApp group called "Haippirinki" ("Hype ring"). Other members in the group were Finnish singer Thomas Kirjonen aka Kasmir and producer Henri Salonen aka Hank Solo. Before the trial Smith had sent defiant messages to Kasmir stating that if the filming would ever go to the court "the trial would be made public" and "the bitches would have to come there too and all the material would be revealed". During the trial Smith tried to defend himself by using a story about a friend called "Peter" who allegedly had been framed for rape that destroyed his life. According to Smith this was the reason for his home video surveillance but it came clear during the trial that "Peter" was a fictitious character.

On 28 February 2017, Smith was convicted of 30 counts of wiretapping, four counts of defamation, and two counts of disseminating information infringing upon private life and received a suspended sentence of 1 year and 2 months and was ordered to pay 150,000 euros compensation to his victims. The investigations had revealed that he had secretly filmed his sexual encounters with 29 women. As of August 2018, Smith had paid over 100,000 euros but not the full court ordered retributions to his victims.

=== After the verdict ===
Smith moved abroad shortly after his conviction. Tabloid newspapers in Finland reported him having moved to London and working there under a new name Cas Smith. Smith's 36.5 m^{2} studio apartment in Etu-Töölö, Helsinki, was foreclosed in May 2017 to cover damages and legal costs of the victims. Attempts have been made to collect unpaid compensations from Smith through foreclosure unsuccessfully as it does not extend Finnish persons living abroad. Smith's company Jook Joint Oy, a record company involved in music industry, was removed from the trade register in April 2020, because he had not submitted the company's accounting documents of two and a half years despite prompts.

Iltalehti reported on 22 February 2023 in an article that not all of the victims had been compensated fully as he is declared indigent in Finland and owning still 35,466.92 euros in the recovery proceedings. Despite this he had earned 416,500 Swedish Krona, or around €37,200, in 2021 and continues being active in social media and creative circles. As of January 2022, Smith has lived in Stockholm, Sweden under a new name Cas Malek-Smith.

== Discography ==
- People Come First (2010)
- 80's Babies (EP, 2013)

=== Singles ===
- "Get Louder" (2012)
