= Lin Jicheng =

Chinese sports shooter

Personal information
- Nationality: Chinese
- Born: 8 April 1957 (age 67)

Sport
- Sport: Sports shooting

Lin Jicheng (born 8 April 1957) is a Chinese sports shooter. He competed in the men's 50 metre rifle three positions event at the 1984 Summer Olympics.
