= Pete Mattila =

American artist

- Born: 8 April 1981 (age 45); Bessemer, Michigan, United States
- Website: https://www.petemattila.com

Pete Mattila (born 8 April 1981) is an American-born blacksmith, artist and sculptor known for his work in forged steel. Born in Bessemer, Michigan in the United States, Mattila lives and works in Hobart, Tasmania. In 2018, he smelted steel in Tasmania in the first documented production of pure Tasmanian steel in the island State.

== Early life ==
Born in Bessemer, Michigan. He travelled a lot as a teenager, riding freight trains through almost every state in the US, working in all sorts of industries.

== Study and Training ==
Trained as a welder and industrial blacksmith, Mattila's work "celebrates complex histories, in art, craft and design as well as in industrial expression" and "the expression of an ethical life through the immediate relationship between hand and mind."

With a master's degree in Fine Arts from the University of Tasmania, he has been featured in a variety of publications.

== Teaching ==
He has taught in both the United States and Australia.

== Exhibitions ==
Exhibited internationally since 2011, his work is included in public and private collections in the U.S. and Australia.
