= Juha Tapio =

Finnish musician (born 1974)

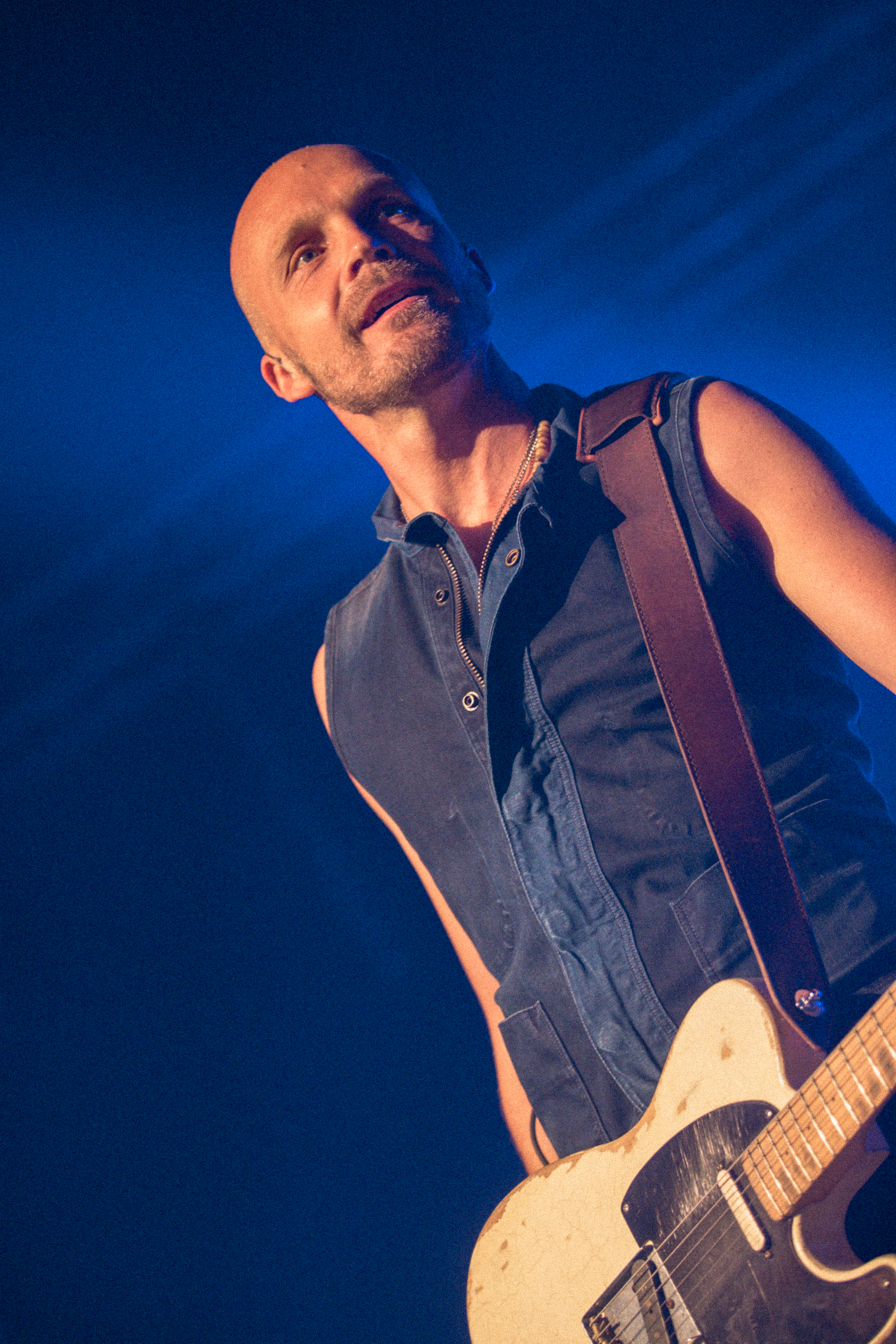
- Tapio in 2016

Background information
- Born: 5 February 1974 (age 52); Vaasa, Finland
- Genres: Schlager, pop, rock, gospel, country pop, pop-folk
- Occupations: Singer, musician, songwriter
- Instruments: Vocals, guitar
- Years active: 1987–present
- Label: Universal Music

Juha Leevi Antero Tapio (born 5 February 1974) is a Finnish singer, songwriter and guitarist. His album Mitä silmät ei nää (2003) sold gold and the album Kaunis ihminen (2006) reached platinum. He is married to Raija Mattila, and together they have two sons, Mikael and Akseli.

Tapio won the Best Male Vocalist Emma Award in 2008.

== Discography ==
=== Albums ===
==== Studio albums ====
Album details	Peak position	Certification
Album details	FIN	Certification
Tuulen valtakunta: Released: 1999; Re-released: 2008; Label: Medusa	—	
Tästä kaikesta: Released: 2001; Label: Warner Music Finland	—	
Mitä silmät ei nää: Released: 2003; Label: Warner Music Finland (WEA)	7	
Ohikiitävää: Released: 2005; Label: WEA	11	Gold
Kaunis ihminen: Released: 2006; Label: WEA	2	Platinum
Suurenmoinen elämä: Released: 2008; Label: WEA	2	Platinum
Hyvä voittaa: Released: 2011; Label: Kaiku Recordings	1	2× Platinum
Joululauluja: Released: 2012; Label: Kaiku Recordings	4	Platinum
Lapislatsulia: Released: 2013; Label: Kaiku Recordings	2	Platinum
Sinun vuorosi loistaa: Released: 2015; Label: Kaiku Recordings	1	
Loistava kokoelma: Released: 2016; Label: Kaiku Recordings	1	
Kuka näkee sut: Released: 13 April 2018; Label: Kaiku Recordings	1	
Pieniä taikoja: Released: 15 February 2019; Label: Kaiku Recordings	2	
Elävien maasaa: Released: 24 February 2023; Label: Kaiku Recordings	2	
Tulihevonen: Released: 27 March 2026; Label: Kaiku Recordings	3	

=== Compilation albums ===
Album details	Peak position	Certification
Album details	FIN	Certification
Suurenmoinen kokoelma 1999–2009: Released: 2009; Label: WEA	1	2× platinum
Tähtisarja – 30 suosikkia: Released: 2011; Label: WEA	23	
Sitkeä sydän – Suurimmat hitit: Released: 2014; Label: Kaiku Recordings / Universal	5	

=== Singles ===
Single	Year	Peak positions				Certification	Album
Single	Year	FIN Official List	Suomen virallinen latauslista	50 Hittiä	Radio List	Certification	Album
"Syksy"	2001	—	—	—	—		Tästä kaikesta
"Mitä silmät ei nää"	2003	—	—	12	2		Mitä silmät ei nää
"Ukkosta ja ullakolla"	2003	—	—	8	3		Mitä silmät ei nää
"Haaveilija"	2004	—	—	12	4		Mitä silmät ei nää
"Arvaamatta tuuli kääntyy"	2005	—	—	5	1		Ohikiitävää
"Ohikiitävää"	2005	—	17	2	1		Ohikiitävää
"Ihme"	2005	—	—	19	7		Ohikiitävää
"Kelpaat kelle vaan"	2006	—	11	1	1		Kaunis ihminen
"Hengittää"	2006	—	—	—	—		Kaunis ihminen
"Anna pois itkuista puolet"	2006	—	—	3	3		Kaunis ihminen
"Koneet kiinni"	2007	—	—	36	18		Kaunis ihminen
"Kaksi puuta"	2008	3	3	—	3	Gold	Suurenmoinen elämä
"Suurenmoinen elämä"	2008	—	—	—	8		Suurenmoinen elämä
"Minä olen, sinä olet"	2009	—	20	—	2		Suurenmoinen elämä
"Raikas tuuli"	2009	—	—	—	2		Suurenmoinen kokoelma
"En mitään en ketään"	2011	19	19	—	2		Hyvä voittaa
"Sitkeä sydän"	2011	—	—	—	3		Hyvä voittaa
"Rakastan niin kauan kuin mä voin"	2012	—	—	—	2		Hyvä voittaa
"Jossain täällä"	2012	—	—	—	6		Hyvä voittaa
"TSNEH (Tykkään susta niin että halkeen)"	2013	—	4	—	3		Lapislatsulia
"Paremmat päivät"	2013	—	—	—	—		Lapislatsulia
"Jotain niin oikeaa"	2016	—	—	—	1		
"Valitsisin sut"	2021	19	—	—	—		
"Puoliski sun" (featuring Viivi)	2026	28	—	—	—		Tulihevonen
