= Apulanta =

Finnish rock band

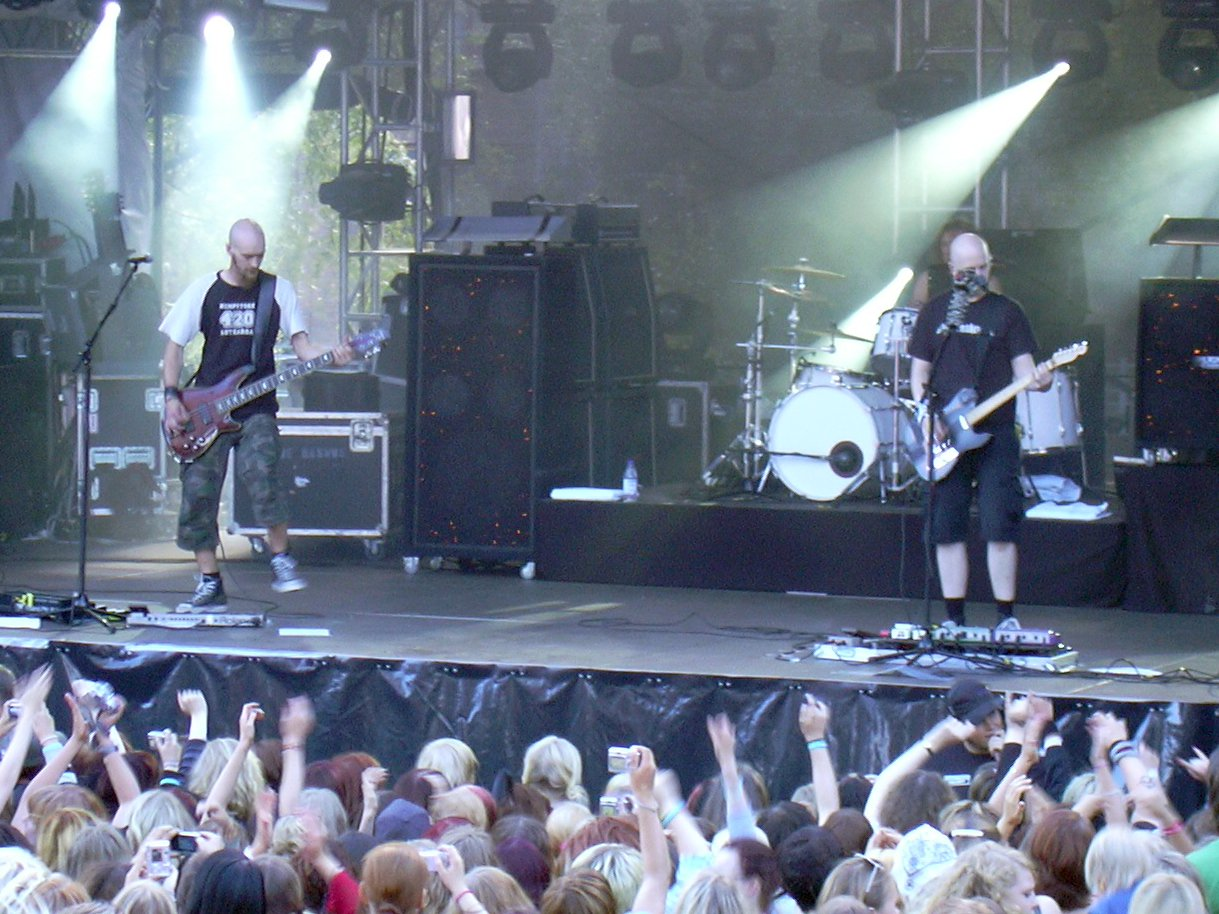
- Apulanta performing in Tampere in 2006

Background information
- Origin: Heinola, Finland
- Genres: Punk rock; alternative rock; hard rock; nu metal
- Years active: 1991–present
- Label: Levy-yhtiö
- Members: Toni Wirtanen; Sipe Santapukki; Ville Mäkinen
- Past members: Sami Lehtinen; Antti Lautala; Amanda Gaynor; Tuukka Temonen
- Website: www.apulanta.fi

Apulanta (Finnish for 'artificial fertilizer') is a Finnish rock band, founded in 1991 when its members were in their mid-teens.

In September 2009, Apulanta members established an independent label, Päijät-Hämeen Sorto ja Riisto ("Päijänne Tavastian Oppression and Exploitation"). Since its beginnings, the label has so far gotten one artist, pop singer Kaija Koo in the summer of 2010. In February 2011, they revealed that they had a new prospective artist in the label, though not disclosing their name.

== Members ==
=== Current members ===
- Toni Wirtanen – lead vocals and guitar (+ bass 1991–1992) (1991–)
- Simo ”Sipe” Santapukki – drums and backing vocals (1991–)
- Ville Mäkinen – bass guitar and contrabass (2014-)

=== Former members ===
- Pauli Hauta-aho – touring guitar (2016)
- Sami ”Parta-Sami” Lehtinen – bass and backing vocals (touring guitar 2001–2004) (2005–2014)
- Antti Lautala – lead vocals and guitar (+ bass 1991–1992) (1991–1994)
- Amanda ”Mandy” Gaynor – bass, trombone and vocals (1992–1993)
- Tuukka Temonen – bass (1993–2004)
- Jani Törmälä – touring guitar (1997, 1998, 2000)
- Sami Yli-Pihlaja – touring guitar (1998–1999, 2000)
- Marzi Nyman – touring guitar (2000)
- Markus "Masi" Hukari – touring guitar (2001)

== Discography ==
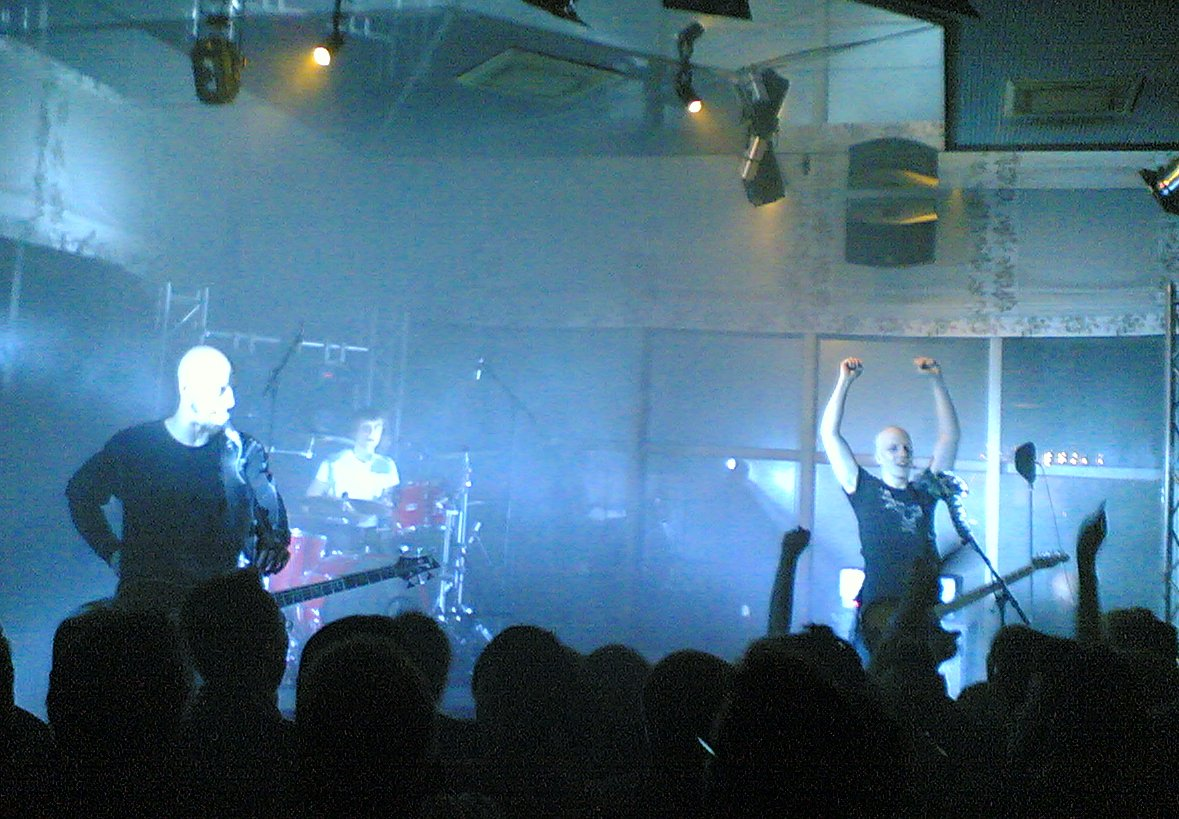
Apulanta in Tampere, 2005

=== Studio albums ===
Year	Album	Translation	Peak positions	
Year	Album	Translation	FIN	
1995	Attack of the A.L. People			
1996	Ehjä	Whole	4	
1997	Kolme	Three	1	
1998	Aivan kuin kaikki muutkin	Just Like Everyone Else	1	
2000	Plastik	Plastic	1	
2001	Heinola 10		1	
2002	Hiekka	Sand	1	
2005	Kiila	Wedge	1	
2007	Eikä vielä ole edes ilta	And It's Not Even Evening Yet	1	
2008	Kuutio (kuinka aurinko voitettiin)	Cube (How the Sun was defeated)	2	
2012	Kaikki kolmesta pahasta	Each Of The Three Evils	2	
2014	Revenge Of The A.L. People		11	
2015	Kunnes siitä tuli totta	Until It Became True	3	
2022	Sielun kaltainen tuote	A Soul-Like Product	3	1

=== Compilation albums ===
Year	Album	Peak positions
Year	Album	FIN
1998	Singlet 1993–1997	1
2001	Syitä ja seurauksia – 30 parasta	1
2003	Singlet 1998–2003	9
2010	Singlet 2004–2009	1
2014	Syytteitä ja selityksiä – 52 Parasta	5

=== Live albums ===
Year	Album	Translation	Peak positions
Year	Album	Translation	FIN
2007	Eikä vieläkään ole edes ilta – live	And It's Not Even Evening Yet – live	26

=== English albums ===
Year	Album	Peak positions
Year	Album	FIN
2001/2002	Viper Spank	14
2000/2003	Apulanta	10

=== Singles and EPs ===
Year	Title	Translation	Peak positions	Album
Year	Title	Translation	FIN	Album
1993	"Mikä ihmeen Apulanta?"	What the Heck Is Apulanta?	—	
1994	"T.S. + A.L."		—	
1994	"Tuttu TV:stä"	As seen on TV	—	
1995	Hajonnut EP	Broken	2	
1996	"Anna mulle piiskaa"	Whip me	1	
1997	"Mato"	Worm	1	
1997	"Liikaa"	Too much	1	
1997	"Mitä vaan"	Anything at all	1	
1998	"Teit meistä kauniin"	You Made Us Beautiful	1	
1999	"Hallaa"	Frost	1	
1999	"Torremolinos 2000" (with Don Huonot)		1	
1999	"Käännä se pois"	Turn it off	1	
2000	"Ei yhtään todistajaa"	No Witnesses	3	
2000	"Maanantai"	Monday	2	
2001	"Viivakoodit"	Bar codes	1	
2001	"Reunalla"	On the Edge	1	
2001	"Kadut"	Streets	1	
2002	"Saasta"	Filth	1	
2002	"Hiekka"	Sand	2	
2003	"Jumala"	God	2	
2003	Pudota EP	Drop it	1	
2005	"Pahempi toistaan"	Each Worse than the other	1	
2005	"Armo"	Mercy	1	
2006	"Koneeseen kadonnut"	Lost into the Machine	1	
2008	Kesä EP	Summer	1	
2008	"Vauriot" / "Kumi, nahka, piiska" / "Punainen helvetti"	Damages / Rubber, Leather, Whip / Red Hell	1	
2009	"Ravistettava ennen käyttöä"	Shake Before Use	1	
2011	"Vääryyttä!!1!"	Injustice!!!1!	1	
2011	"Pihtiote"	Pliers' Grasp	1	
2019	"Lokin päällä lokki"	Seagull on a Seagull	3	
2020	"60 uutta ongelmaa"	60 New Problems	10	
2022	"9 väärää kättä"	9 Wrong Hands	19	

=== DVDs ===
- Liikkuvat kuvat (in English "Motion Pictures", 2002)
- Kesäaine ("Summer Essay", 2006)

== See also ==
- List of best-selling music artists in Finland
