= John Duus (sport shooter) =

Norwegian sport shooter (born 1955)

Personal information
- Nationality: Norwegian
- Born: 11 April 1955 (age 70); Oslo

Sport
- Sport: Shooting

John Duus (born 11 April 1955) is a Norwegian sport shooter. He competed in 50 metre rifle, prone and 50 metre rifle three positions at the 1984 Summer Olympics in Los Angeles.
