= Talak Al-Otaibi =

Saudi Arabian sport shooter

Personal information
- Nationality: Saudi Arabia
- Born: 26 October 1965 (age 59); Riyadh, Saudi Arabia
- Height: 1.72 m (5 ft 8 in)
- Weight: 66 kg (146 lb)

Sport
- Sport: Shooting

Talak Al-Otaibi (Arabic: طلاق العتيبي; born 26 October 1965) is a Saudi Arabian sport shooter. He competed in the 1984 Summer Olympics.
