= Jack Achilles =

Dutch shooter

Personal information
- Full name: Jacob Hendrik Achilles
- Nationality: Dutch
- Born: 6 February 1943 (age 82); Haarlem, Netherlands
- Height: 1.82 m (6 ft 0 in)
- Weight: 98 kg (216 lb)

Sport
- Sport: Shooting

Jacob Hendrik "Jack" Achilles (born 6 February 1943) is a Dutch shooter. He competed in the 1984 Summer Olympics.
