= Toni Wirtanen =

Finnish musician (born 1975)

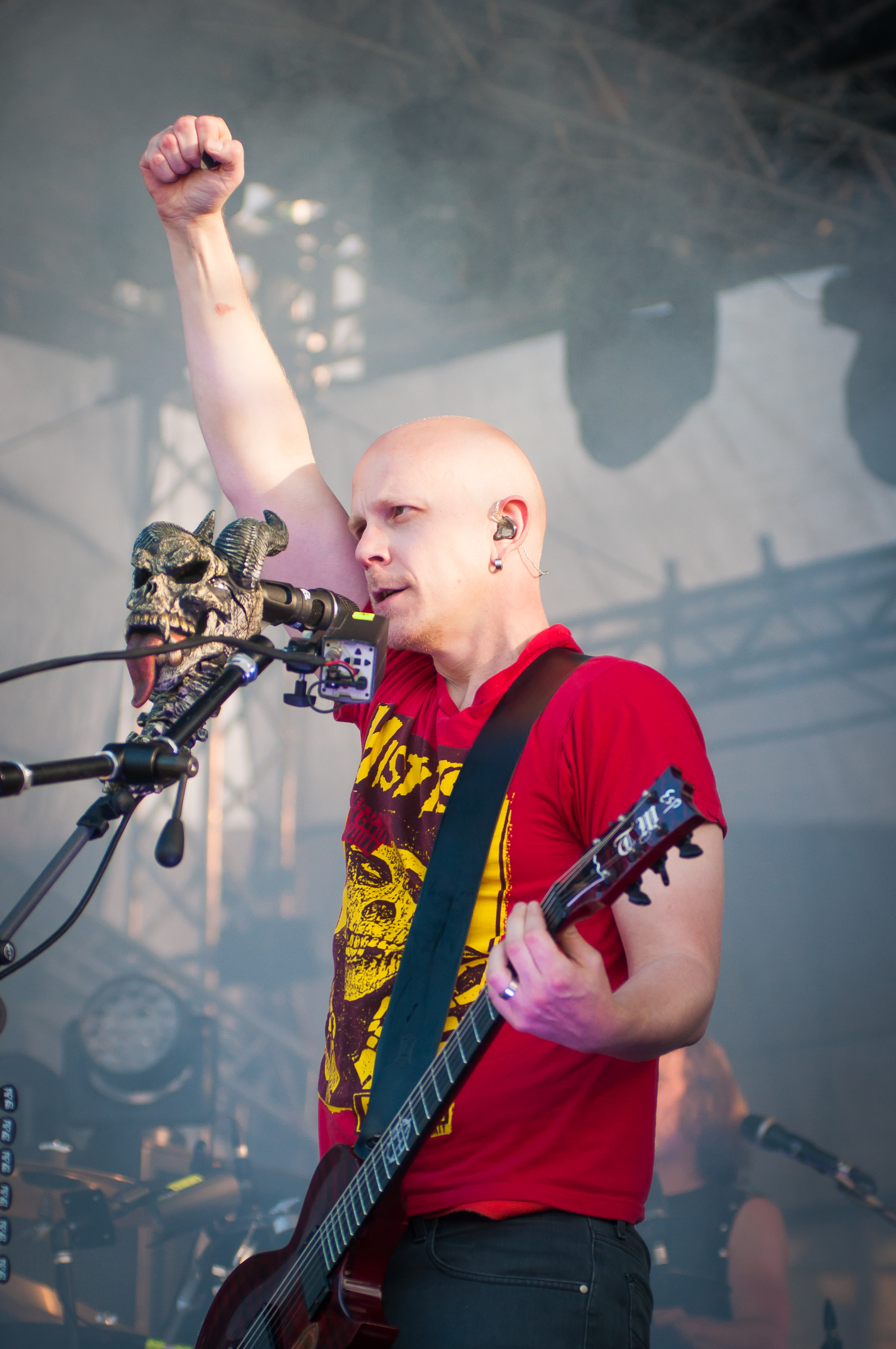
Toni Wirtanen at the 2014 Rakuuna Rock festival in Lappeenranta, Finland.

Toni Juhana Wirtanen (born 4 April 1975, in Heinola, Finland) is a Finnish musician, best known as the vocalist, guitarist and songwriter for the rock band Apulanta.

Wirtanen is also known for having written numerous songs for the Finnish pop singer Irina, and appeared in the 1999 movie Pitkä kuuma kesä, portraying the lead-singer of the school band The Vittupäät.

== Discography ==
Charting hits featured in

- 2003: "Dynamite" (Beats And Styles featuring Toni W & B.O. Dubb) (Peaked in FIN: #2)
- 2003: "Asvaltti" (Toni Wirtanen, Infekto, Leijonanmieli, Paarma, Nopsajalka, Bommitommi) (Peaked in FIN: #8)
- 2014: "Hätähuuto" (Brädi feat. Toni Wirtanen) (Peaked in FIN: #3)
- 2014: "Sata kesää, tuhat yötä" (Vain elämää, season 3, Paula Koivuniemi Day) (Peaked in FIN: #12)
