= Anne Mattila =

Finnish singer and painter

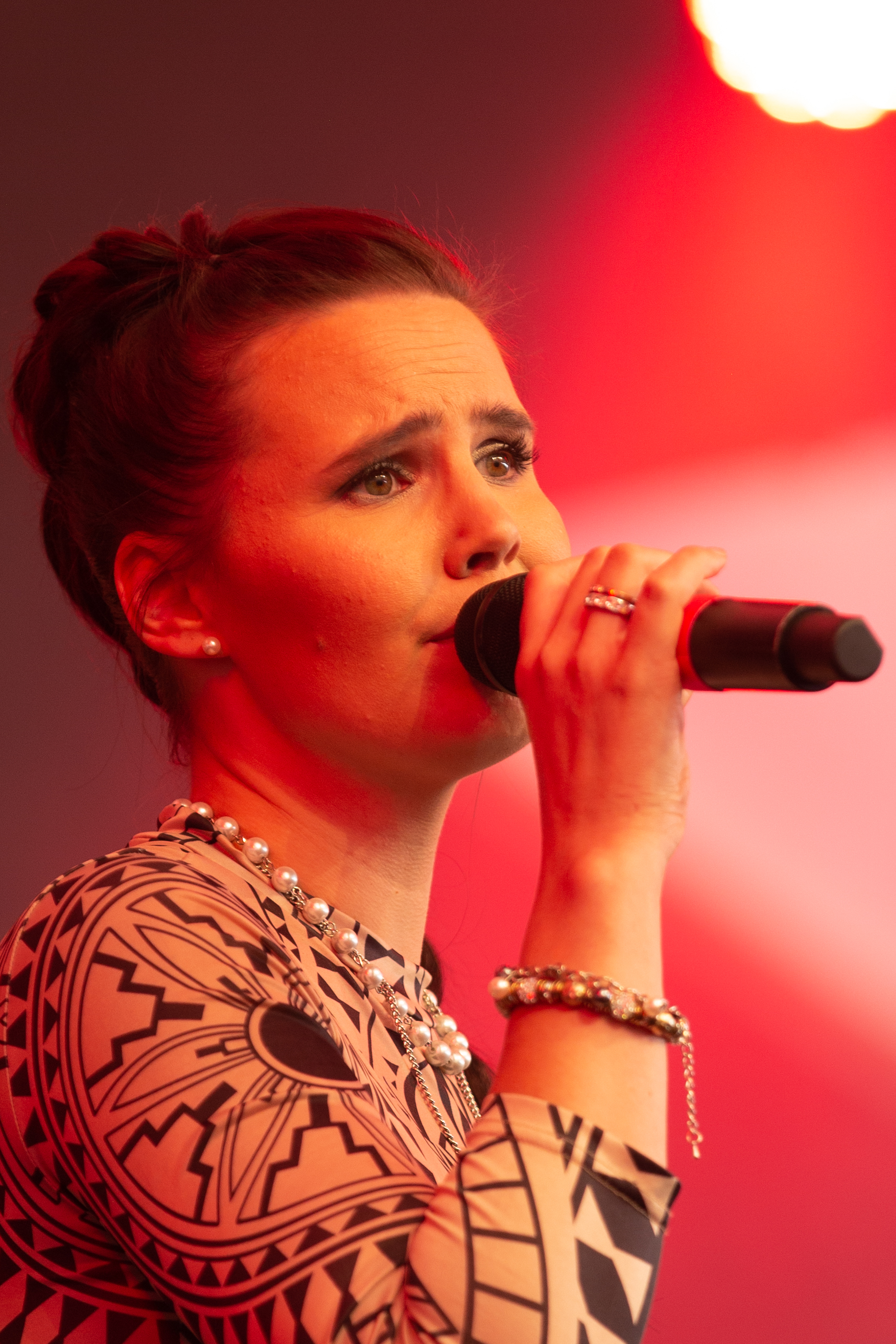
- Anne Mattila at the Kiuruvesi Iskelmäviikko music event (2018)

Background information
- Born: Anne Sisko Mattila; 31 May 1984 (age 41); Karvia, Finland
- Genres: Pop, Schlager
- Occupations: Singer; songwriter; painter
- Instrument: Vocals
- Years active: 1998–present
- Labels: Sony Music; Warner Music Finland
- Website: www.annemattila.fi

Anne Mattila (born 31 May 1984 in Karvia) is a Finnish singer and painter. Active since 1999, she has released sixteen albums, six of which were certified platinum in Finland.
