= Mikko Mattila =

Finnish sports shooter

Personal information
- Nationality: Finnish
- Born: 5 January 1953 (age 72); Kouvola, Finland

Sport
- Sport: Sports shooting

Mikko Mattila (born 5 January 1953) is a Finnish sports shooter. He competed in two events at the 1984 Summer Olympics.
