= Robin Packalen discography =

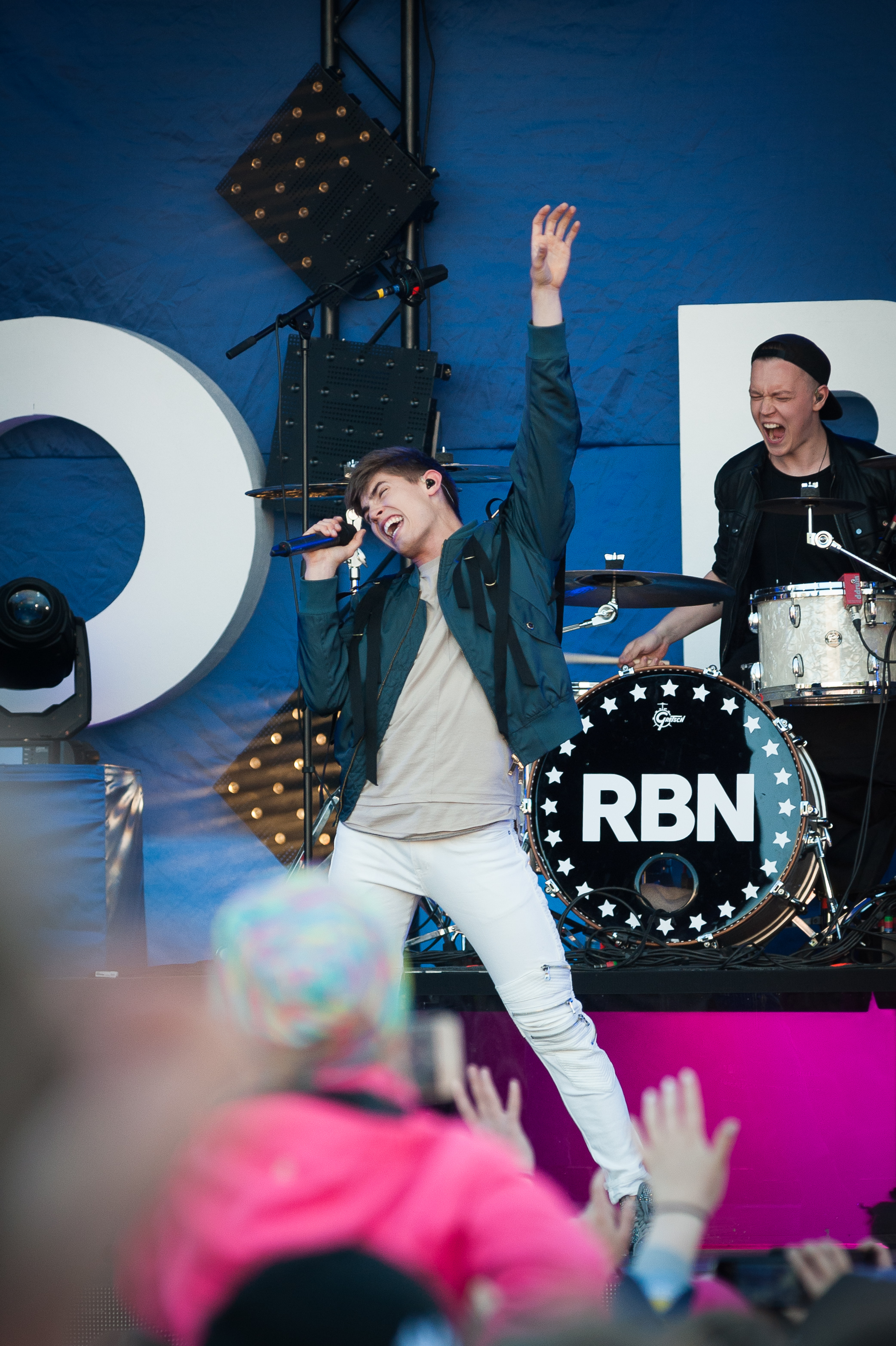
- Studio albums: 6
- EPs: 2
- Singles: 12
- Remix albums: 1
- Guest appearances: 1

This article contains the discography of Finnish singer Robin Packalen and includes information relating to his album and single releases.

== Albums ==
=== Studio albums ===
Title	Album details	Peak chart positions
Title	Album details	FIN
Koodi	Released: 22 February 2012; Label: Universal Music Finland; Format: Digital download, CD	—
Chillaa	Released: 5 October 2012; Label: Universal Music Finland; Format: Digital download, CD	1
Boom Kah	Released: 4 October 2013; Label: Universal Music Finland; Format: Digital download, CD	1
16	Released: 22 September 2014; Label: Universal Music Finland; Format: Digital download, CD	1
Yhdessä	Released: 9 October 2015; Label: Universal Music Finland; Format: Digital download, CD	1
Punasel	Released: 29 November 2024; Label: Universal Music Finland; Format: Digital download, CD	5

=== Remix albums ===
Title	Album details	Peak chart positions
Title	Album details	FIN
Boombox	Released: 11 March 2014; Label: Universal Music Finland; Format: Digital download, CD	1

=== Compilation albums ===
Title	Album details	Peak chart positions
Title	Album details	FIN
Me tehtiin tää 2012–2017	Released: 27 October 2017; Label: Universal Music Finland; Format: Digital download, CD	3

== Extended plays ==
Title	EP details	Peak chart positions
Title	EP details	FIN
Rest in Beat PM	Released: 18 December 2020; Label: Universal Music Finland; Format: Digital download, streaming	46
Rest in Beat AM	Released: 15 October 2021; Label: Universal Music Finland; Format: Digital download, streaming	27

== Singles ==
Year	Title	Peak chart position		Album
Year	Title	FIN	LAT Air.	Album
2012	"Frontside Ollie"	1	*	Koodi
2012	"Faija skitsoo"	—	*	Koodi
2012	"Hiljainen tyttö"	—	*	Koodi
2012	"Puuttuva palanen" (featuring Brädi)	4	*	Chillaa
2012	"Luupilla mun korvissa"	—	*	Chillaa
2013	"Haluan sun palaavan"	—	*	Chillaa
2013	"Boom Kah" (featuring Mikael Gabriel & Uniikki)	4	*	Boom Kah
2013	"Erilaiset"	1	*	Boom Kah
2014	"Onnellinen"	—	*	Boom Kah
2014	"Tilttaamaan" (featuring Lord Est)	—	*	Boombox
2014	"Kesärenkaat"	1	*	16
2014	"Parasta just nyt" (featuring Nikke Ankara)	13	*	16
2014	"Paperilennokki"	—	*	16
2015	"Kipinän hetki" (featuring Elastinen)	3	—	Non-album single
2015	"Yö kuuluu meille" (featuring Santa Cruz, Nikke Ankara, Brädi & Jussi 69)	9	—	Yhdessä
2015	"Milloin nään sut uudestaan?" (featuring Kasmir)	4	—	Yhdessä
2016	"Miten eskimot suutelee?" (featuring Sanni)	14	—	Yhdessä
2016	"Jotain aitoo"	12	—	Non-album singles
2017	"Hula Hula" (featuring Nelli Matula)	5	—	Non-album singles
2017	"Rakkaus on lumivalkoinen"	3	—	Non-album singles
2017	"Kymmenen kirosanaa"	3	—	Non-album singles
2017	"Hollywood Hills"	18	—	Non-album singles
2017	"En mielestäin sua saa"	20	—	Non-album singles
2017	"Me tehtiin tää"	1	—	Non-album singles
2019	"I'll Be with You" (with Kovee and Joznez)	3	—	Non-album singles
2019	"Suit That"	—	—	Non-album singles
2020	"Benefits"	15	—	Non-album singles
2020	"Drop Dead"	—	—	Rest in Beat PM
2021	"Hard to Love" (featuring Alex Mattson)	19	—	Rest in Beat AM
2021	"Sucker for That Love" (featuring SAAY)	—	—	Rest in Beat AM
2022	"Goddess"	—	—	Non-album singles
2022	"Ohikiitävää"	14	—	Non-album singles
2022	"Magic" (featuring Maejor)	—	—	Non-album singles
2022	"Ihana kipu" (with Viivi)	1	—	Non-album singles
2023	"Girls Like You"	—	—	Non-album singles
2023	"Kolmistaan" (with Ege Zulu)	7	—	Non-album singles
2023	"Sinä 4Ever"	4	—	Vain elämää kausi 14
2023	"Ime huiluu"	33	—	Vain elämää kausi 14
2023	"Sä et ole hullu" (featuring Ege Zulu)	39	—	Vain elämää kausi 14
2024	"Kuumilla hiilillä"	5	—	Punasel
2024	"Häitä pidelly" (with Tupe)	2	—	Punasel
2024	"Täydellinen ex"	5	—	Punasel
2024	"Punasel"	15	—	Punasel
2025	"Leijonanruokaa" (with Aliisa Syrjä)	14	—	Non-album singles
2025	"Dust" (with Alan Walker)	50	5	Non-album singles
2025	"Unelmavävy"	19	—	Non-album singles
2025	"Tuut tuut tuut"	27	—	Non-album singles
2026	"1001 tapaa"	45	—	Non-album singles
2026	"Onnellinen 2.0" (with Viivi)	33	—	2.0
2026	"Boom Kah 2.0" (with Senya)	38	—	2.0
2026	"Puuttuva palanen 2.0" (with Tupe)	49	—	2.0
2026	"DND" (with Nathanael)	50	—	Non-album single
"—" denotes a recording that did not chart or was not released in that country. "*" denotes that the chart did not exist at that time.
