= 2014 in European music =

2014 in continental European music in geographical order.

== Scandinavia & Finland ==
Danish #1 singles

- The 59th Eurovision Song Contest takes place at the B&W Hallerne, Copenhagen. It is won by Austria's Conchita Wurst with the song "Rise Like a Phoenix".
- In July, the Roskilde Festival featured The Rolling Stones, Arctic Monkeys, Damon Albarn, Jack White, Outkast and Stevie Wonder.
- Metal band Volbeat are crowned best international Rock/Alternative act at the German Echo awards.
- Rapper L.O.C. has his third #1 with "Marquis".
- After being #1 five times with platinum status singles between 2008 – 2011 singer-songwriter Medina has her sixth and seventh chart toppers with Jalousi and "Når intet er godt nok".

Norway 2014

- Morten Harket's album Brother is a #1 in Norway.
- Nico & Vinz are Top 5 in many European countries with "Am I Wrong"
- Anders Nilsen is #1 in Norway and the Netherlands with his Spanish novelty song Salsa Tequila.
- DJ Martin Tungevaag has a #1 in Austria and Top5 in Scandinavia with Wicked Wonderland

Swedish #1 singles and albums

- Ace Wilder doesn't win the Melodifestivalen 2014 with her song Busy Doin' Nothin and therefore doesn't represent Sweden at Eurovision 2014, but it climbs to #1.
- Avicii's Addicted to you tops the Hungarian and Polish charts and is top 10 in most other European countries. The Days is a #1 in Sweden, Hungary and the Czech Republic.
- Pop-soul singer Seinabo Sey who has a Gambian father has a #1 in Norway with Kygo Remix of Younger.
- AronChupa of electro-hip hop group Albatraoz has a solo hit with "I am an Albatraoz", it's #1 in Sweden and Finland but popular throughout Europe.

Finnish #1 singles, #1 albums

- Finnish 15-year-old Robin has his second #1 album with Boom Kah which features the chart topper Erilaiset. In March 2014 he releases his third album Boombox, also a #1.
- Power metal band Sonata Arctica have their third national #1 album with Pariah's Child but don't reach the top 10 anywhere else

== Netherlands ==
Dutch #1 singles

- Rapper Mr. Probz' single "Waves" (Robin Schulz Remix) is #1 in Germany, Austria, Switzerland, Sweden, Norway, Portugal, UK, Czech Rep. and Hungary and top 5 in several other countries but only #6 in the Netherlands. Nothing Really Matters, on the other hand, is a local #1 but not successful internationally.
- Symphonic metal band Within Temptation continue to produce successful albums. Hydra is their fifth album straight to crack the German Top 10. It's their first album in the English top 10 and US top 20.
- Crooner Marco Borsato continues to have tremendous success in Dutch-speaking countries. "Duizend spiegels" from late 2013 reaches platinum status.
- Bakermat has a #1 in France and goes top 5 in many other countries with "One Day (Vandaag)".

== Belgium ==
- Milow who became a star in 2009 with a cover version of 50 Cent's Ayo Technology is shortly #1 in the Flemish Ultratop charts and #7 in Germany with his new album "Silver Linings".
- Tomorrowland: 400,000 people attend the 10 year anniversary of the world's largest electronic music festival in Boom. It wins the International Dance Music Awards for the third year straight.

== Germany ==
List of number-one hits of 2014 (Germany)

- Helene Fischer tops the German, Austrian and Swiss charts with her 2013 album "Farbenspiel" which is also top 10 in the Netherlands and Denmark. It was awarded Gold after just three days. Single "Atemlos durch die Nacht" is #1 in Austria and #3 in Germany.
- Controversial rapper Bushido's album Sonny Black also climbs to the top of the charts in Germany, Austria and Switzerland.
- Gangster rapper Kollegah has his first #1 album "King" in Germany, Austria and Switzerland.
- At the Echo awards Italian act Frei.Wild, excluded the year before, turn the tables and boycott the event this year. There is no major winner, Tim Bendzko, Ina Müller, Sportfreunde Stiller, The BossHoss, Max Herre, and Adel Tawil all get an award, host Helene Fischer gets two.
- Milky Chance's 2013 hit "Stolen Dance" which reached the top in Switzerland, Austria and Luxemburg in 2013 becomes a delayed hit in Eastern Europe, it is a #1 in Poland and the Czech Republic.
- Is it Right by Elaiza is only #18 out of 26 participants at the Eurovision Song Contest but reaches #1 in the Polish charts. Several group members are of Polish descent.
- DJ Alle Farben has a local #9 with She Moves (Far Away) ft New Zealander Graham Candy, it tops the charts in Hungary.

== Switzerland and Austria ==
- List of number-one hits of 2014 (Switzerland)
- Gotthard's new album "Bang! climbs to #1, it's their 15th chart topper.
- List of number-one hits of 2014 (Austria)
- Conchita Wurst wins the ESC with Rise Like a Phoenix, it's a #1 at home and top 5 in Germany, Switzerland and Finland.

== France ==
2014 French #1 singles and albums

- R&B singer Indila's debut album Mini World climbs to #1, her single Dernière danse becomes a #2.
- Charity project Les Enfoirés have the #1 album as in almost every year
- Faul & Wad Ad have a Deep house hit across Europe with Changes, it is #1 in Germany and Poland.
- David Guetta collaborates with Dutch electronic dance music act Showtek on his song Bad which is successful in Scandinavia, a #1 in Finland and Norway and also in South Korea. Another single Dangerous featuring American singer Sam Martin is #1 in France, Croatia, Norway, Finland, Germany, Switzerland, Austria, Luxemburg, Poland, Portugal, Slovakia, Spain, Israel and Lebanon. The album Listen only climbs the Hungarian charts.
- Folk pop duo Lilly Wood and the Prick's Prayer in C (Robin Schulz remix) climbs to the top of the charts in practically all European countries, Lebanon and Israel.

== Portugal ==
- Paulo Gonzo's 2013 album "Duetos" reaches #1.

== Spain ==
- David Bisbal has a big hit with "Diez Mil Maneras", the first single of his fifth album "Tu y yo" which also reaches the top like all predecessors.
- Enrique Iglesias tops the charts in Italy, Spain, Portugal and several Latin American countries with Bailando

== Italy ==
List of number-one hits of 2014 (Italy)

- Arisa wins the Sanremo Music Festival 2014 with "Controvento", the song climbs to the top position in the charts

== Eastern Europe/ Balkans ==
- List of number-one singles of 2014 (Poland);List of number-one albums of 2014 (Poland)
- List of number-one songs of the 2010s (Czech Republic)#2014
- Hungary charttoppers

Budapest's Sziget Festival 2014 in August on the island Óbudai-sziget features Blink-182, Queens of the Stone Age, Jake Bugg, Imagine Dragons, Placebo, Skrillex, Bastille, Lily Allen, Macklemore & Ryan Lewis, Cee Lo Green, Manic Street Preachers, Korn, Outkast and Calvin Harris.

== Deaths ==
- 3 August – Yvette Giraud, French singer and actress, 97
- 17 August – Pierre Vassiliu, Swiss-born French singer, 76
- 23 August – Inga Juuso, Norwegian singer and actress, 68
- 24 August – Aldo Donati, Italian singer, composer and television personality, 66 (cerebral hemorrhage)
- 27 August
  - Jan Groth, Norwegian singer (Aunt Mary, Just 4 Fun), 68 (cancer)
  - Peret, 79, Spanish singer, guitarist and composer, 79
- 2 September – Antonis Vardis, 66, Greek composer and singer.
