= List of number-one albums of 2012 (Finland) =

This is the complete list of (physical and digital) number-one albums sold in Finland in 2012 according to the Official Finnish Charts composed by Musiikkituottajat – IFPI Finland.

The best-performing album in 2012 in the Finnish chart was 21 by English Adele, spending nine weeks on the top spot. The second-best chart performer was Finnish Jukka Poika with his album Yhdestä puusta spending six weeks atop. The third-best-performing album was Vain elämää, a compilation of songs by various artists from the similarly titled TV series, spending five weeks atop.

The top-ten list of the best-selling 2012 albums in Finland was the following:

| | Album | Artist(s) | Sales | Reference(s) |
|---|---|---|---|---|
| 1 | Vain elämää | various artists | 164,119 | |
| 2 | Koodi | Robin | 117,126 | |
| 3 | Vain elämää jatkuu | various artists | 81,725 | |
| 4 | Chillaa | Robin | 73,439 | |
| 5 | 21 | Adele | 44,297 | |
| 6 | Yhdestä puusta | Jukka Poika | 42,429 | |
| 7 | Vie mut kotiin | Jesse Kaikuranta | 38,985 | |
| 8 | Kun valaistun | Chisu | 31,541 | |
| 9 | Joululauluja | Juha Tapio | 29,080 | |
| 10 | Hunningolla | Erin | 27,655 | |

== Chart history ==
Physical & digital albums
| Week | Album | Artist(s) | Reference(s) |
|---|---|---|---|
| Week 1 | 21 | Adele | |
| Week 2 | 21 | Adele | |
| Week 3 | 21 | Adele | |
| Week 4 | 21 | Adele | |
| Week 5 | 21 | Adele | |
| Week 6 | Old Ideas | Leonard Cohen | |
| Week 7 | Nocebo | Stam1na | |
| Week 8 | 21 | Adele | |
| Week 9 | 21 | Adele | |
| Week 10 | 21 | Adele | |
| Week 11 | Wrecking Ball | Bruce Springsteen | |
| Week 12 | Yhdestä puusta | Jukka Poika | |
| Week 13 | MDNA | Madonna | |
| Week 14 | Petäjäveräjät | Viikate | |
| Week 15 | Yhdestä puusta | Jukka Poika | |
| Week 16 | Yhdestä puusta | Jukka Poika | |
| Week 17 | Yhdestä puusta | Jukka Poika | |
| Week 18 | Maan tapa | Paleface | |
| Week 19 | Yhdestä puusta | Jukka Poika | |
| Week 20 | Yhdestä puusta | Jukka Poika | |
| Week 21 | Stones Grow Her Name | Sonata Arctica | |
| Week 22 | Stones Grow Her Name | Sonata Arctica | |
| Week 23 | JVG.fi | JVG | |
| Week 24 | Rakkaudesta | PMMP | |
| Week 25 | Rakkaudesta | PMMP | |
| Week 26 | Rakkaudesta | PMMP | |
| Week 27 | Living Things | Linkin Park | |
| Week 28 | Outta My Head | Diandra | |
| Week 29 | Voicen Kesähitti 2012 | Various artists | |
| Week 30 | Fuck Vivaldi | Eevil Stöö and Koksukoo | |
| Week 31 | 21 | Adele | |
| Week 32 | Voicen Kesähitti 2012 | Various artists | |
| Week 33 | Voicen Kesähitti 2012 | Various artists | |
| Week 34 | Voicen Kesähitti 2012 | Various artists | |
| Week 35 | Tavalliset hautajaiset | Samuli Putro | |
| Week 36 | Kerkko Koskinen Kollektiivi | Kerkko Koskinen Kollektiivi | |
| Week 37 | Kadonneen louhikäärmeen arvoitus | Hevisaurus | |
| Week 38 | Kadonneen louhikäärmeen arvoitus | Hevisaurus | |
| Week 39 | Ilon pirstaleet | Elonkerjuu | |
| Week 40 | The 2nd Law | Muse | |
| Week 41 | Chillaa | Robin | |
| Week 42 | Chillaa | Robin | |
| Week 43 | 180 astetta | Mokoma | |
| Week 44 | Chillaa | Robin | |
| Week 45 | Vie mut kotiin | Jesse Kaikuranta | |
| Week 46 | Pelko ja rakkaus | Yö | |
| Week 47 | Vain elämää | Various artists | |
| Week 48 | Vain elämää | Various artists | |
| Week 49 | Vain elämää | Various artists | |
| Week 50 | Vain elämää | Various artists | |
| Week 51 | Vain elämää | Various artists | |
| Week 52 | Vain elämää jatkuu | Various artists | |

== See also ==
- List of number-one singles of 2012 (Finland)
