= Kesäkumi =

Kesäkumi is a major annual Finnish campaign organized by the Finnish Red Cross (in Finnish Suomen Punainen Risti), the Family Federation of Finland (Väestöliitto) and Finnish radio station YleX (originally called Radiomafia). Held every summer since 1996, it aims to encourage young people to prevent the spread of STDs (sexually transmitted diseases) and informs and encourages them to safe sex through use of condoms, thus the name Kesäkumi (meaning "summer rubber" in Finnish).

The campaign is supported by major Finnish and international artists and free condoms are distributed throughout the summer events. The campaign is also followed through direct broadcasts by YleX radio that gains much bigger listening audiences during the festival.

Summer Rubber is a registered trademark held by Yle. The campaign was spearheaded by Radiomafia presenters Jusu Lounela and Eve Mantu. In later years, Kesäkumi partnered for an additional winter event that coincides with World AIDS Day.

== Theme songs ==
A major theme song is launched contributed each year by a lead artist in Finland that usually becomes a radio hit. In some years supergroup collaborations have been formed for the songs made up of more than one major band or group of performers. The theme songs until now:

- 1996: Reino syö akryylimassaa: "Kumia ja nahkaa" (with Raptori and Päivi Lepistö)
- 1997: Nuoret Kemistit feat. Nylon Beat: "Kesägummitus" (with Kemistit and Apulanta)
- 1998: Klamydia: "Onnesta soikeena"
- 1999: Juustopäät: "Kumimuumi"
- 2000: Seremoniamestari: "Vinyyliä ja kumia"
- 2001: KMA feat. Mariko: "Kuuma kissa"
- 2002: Rockin da North: "Tuu mun uniin"
- 2003: Mordor Boys: "Peitä lohikäärme"
- 2004: Tiktak feat. Peltsi & Juuso: "Oma syy"
- 2005: PMMP: "Kumivirsi"
- 2006: Smak: "Antaa palaa vaan"
- 2007: Antti Tuisku feat. Mariska: "Hyppää kyytiin"
- 2008: Pariisin Kevät feat. Katri Ylander & Super Janne: "Mä haluun sua enemmän ku muut haluu"
- 2009: Haloo Helsinki!: "Mun sydän sanoo niin"
- 2010: Herra Ylppö & Ihmiset: "Hevimetallia"
- 2011: Fintelligens feat. Cheek: "Etkot, juhlat ja jatkot (ja Kesäkumit)"
- 2012: DUO: "Panisin"
- 2013: Cheek feat. Jukka Poika: "Jossu"
- 2014: Robin: "Kesärenkaat"
- 2015: Kasmir feat. SAARA: "Vauvoja"
- 2016: Tungevaag & Raaban feat. VENIOR: Stay Awake
- 2017: Vilma Alina, Nelli Matula, Sini Yasemin and Ida Paul: Tyynysotaa
- 2018: Antti Tuisku: "Kumipuku"
- 2019: Gasellit: "Suojaus petti"
- 2020: Tuure Boelius: "Hengitä"
- 2021: Erika Vikman & Arttu Wiskari: "Tääl on niin kuuma"
- 2022: Etta & Isaac Sene: "Rakastellaan"
- 2023: Bess: "Missio"
- 2024: Tuuli: "Lähellä"
