= List of number-one singles of 2012 (Finland) =

This is the complete list of (physical and digital) number-one singles sold in Finland in 2012 according to the Official Finnish Charts. The list on the left side of the box (Suomen virallinen singlelista, "the Official Finnish Singles Chart") represents physical and digital track sales as well as music streaming (from week 14 onwards) and the one on the right side (Suomen virallinen latauslista, "the Official Finnish Download Chart") represents sales of digital tracks.

== Chart history ==
Official Finnish Singles Chart				Official Finnish Download Chart			
Issue date	Song	Artist(s)	Reference(s)	Issue date	Song	Artist(s)	Reference(s)
Week 1 (January 3)	"Vuosi vaihtuu"	Lord Est (feat. Mikael Gabriel)		Week 1	"Vuosi vaihtuu"	Lord Est (feat. Mikael Gabriel)	
Week 2 (January 10)	"Someone like You"	Adele		Week 2	"Someone like You"	Adele	
Week 3 (January 17)	"Rolling in the Deep"	Adele		Week 3	"Rolling in the Deep"	Adele	
Week 4 (January 24)	"Frontside Ollie"	Robin		Week 4	"Frontside Ollie"	Robin	
Week 5 (January 31)	"Frontside Ollie"	Robin		Week 5	"Frontside Ollie"	Robin	
Week 6 (February 7)	"Give Me All Your Luvin'"	Madonna (feat. Nicki Minaj and M.I.A.)		Week 6	"Give Me All Your Luvin'"	Madonna (feat. Nicki Minaj and M.I.A.)	
Week 7 (February 14)	"Hetken tie on kevyt"	Laura Närhi		Week 7	"Hetken tie on kevyt"	Laura Närhi	
Week 8 (February 21)	"Frontside Ollie"	Robin		Week 8	"Frontside Ollie"	Robin	
Week 9 (February 28)	"Frontside Ollie"	Robin		Week 9	"Frontside Ollie"	Robin	
Week 10 (March 6)	"The Crow, the Owl and the Dove"	Nightwish		Week 10	"Frontside Ollie"	Robin	
Week 11 (March 13)	"Euphoria"	Loreen		Week 11	"Euphoria"	Loreen	
Week 12 (March 20)	"Älä tyri nyt"	Jukka Poika		Week 12	"Älä tyri nyt"	Jukka Poika	
Week 13 (March 27)	"Älä tyri nyt"	Jukka Poika		Week 13	"Älä tyri nyt"	Jukka Poika	
Week 14 (April 3)	"Älä tyri nyt"	Jukka Poika		Week 14	"Älä tyri nyt"	Jukka Poika	
Week 15 (April 10)	"Älä tyri nyt"	Jukka Poika		Week 15	"Älä tyri nyt"	Jukka Poika	
Week 16 (April 17)	"Somebody That I Used to Know"	Gotye (feat. Kimbra)		Week 16	"Somebody That I Used to Know"	Gotye (feat. Kimbra)	
Week 17 (April 24)	"Somebody That I Used to Know"	Gotye (feat. Kimbra)		Week 17	"Somebody That I Used to Know"	Gotye (feat. Kimbra)	
Week 18 (May 1)	"Somebody That I Used to Know"	Gotye (feat. Kimbra)		Week 18	"Vie mut kotiin"	Jesse Kaikuranta	
Week 19 (May 8)	"Call Me Maybe"	Carly Rae Jepsen		Week 19	"Euphoria"	Loreen	
Week 20 (May 15)	"Call Me Maybe"	Carly Rae Jepsen		Week 20	"Euphoria"	Loreen	
Week 21 (May 22)	"Call Me Maybe"	Carly Rae Jepsen		Week 21	"Kran Turismo"	JVG (feat. Raappana)	
Week 22 (May 29)	"Euphoria"	Loreen		Week 22	"Euphoria"	Loreen	
Week 23 (June 5)	"Kran Turismo"	JVG (feat. Raappana)		Week 23	"Euphoria"	Loreen	
Week 24 (June 12)	"Kran Turismo"	JVG (feat. Raappana)		Week 24	"Euphoria"	Loreen	
Week 25 (June 19)	"Kran Turismo"	JVG (feat. Raappana)		Week 25	"Kran Turismo"	JVG (feat. Raappana)	
Week 26 (June 26)	"Kran Turismo"	JVG (feat. Raappana)		Week 26	"Kran Turismo"	JVG (feat. Raappana)	
Week 27 (July 3)	"Kran Turismo"	JVG (feat. Raappana)		Week 27	"Kran Turismo"	JVG (feat. Raappana)	
Week 28 (July 10)	"Kran Turismo"	JVG (feat. Raappana)		Week 28	"Kran Turismo"	JVG (feat. Raappana)	
Week 29 (July 17)	"Kran Turismo"	JVG (feat. Raappana)		Week 29	"Kran Turismo"	JVG (feat. Raappana)	
Week 30 (July 24)	"Kran Turismo"	JVG (feat. Raappana)		Week 30	"Kran Turismo"	JVG (feat. Raappana)	
Week 31 (July 31)	"Kran Turismo"	JVG (feat. Raappana)		Week 31	"Enemmän duoo ku sooloo"	Kuningasidea	
Week 32 (August 7)	"Kran Turismo"	JVG (feat. Raappana)		Week 32	"Kran Turismo"	JVG (feat. Raappana)	
Week 33 (August 14)	"Kran Turismo"	JVG (feat. Raappana)		Week 33	"Syypää sun hymyyn"	Cheek (feat. Yasmine Yamajako)	
Week 34 (August 21)	"Kran Turismo"	JVG (feat. Raappana)		Week 34	"This Is Love"	will.i.am (feat. Eva Simons)	
Week 35 (August 28)	"Lämpöö"	Brädi (feat. Redrama)		Week 35	"Gangnam Style"	Psy	
Week 36 (September 4)	"This Is Love"	will.i.am (feat. Eva Simons)		Week 36	"Gangnam Style"	Psy	
Week 37 (September 11)	"This Is Love"	will.i.am (feat. Eva Simons)		Week 37	"Gangnam Style"	Psy	
Week 38 (September 18)	"Gangnam Style"	Psy		Week 38	"Gangnam Style"	Psy	
Week 39 (September 25)	"Gangnam Style"	Psy		Week 39	"Gangnam Style"	Psy	
Week 40 (October 2)	"Gangnam Style"	Psy		Week 40	"Gangnam Style"	Psy	
Week 41 (October 9)	"Gangnam Style"	Psy		Week 41	"Skyfall"	Adele	
Week 42 (October 16)	"I Cry"	Flo Rida		Week 42	"Skyfall"	Adele	
Week 43 (October 23)	"I Cry"	Flo Rida		Week 43	"Gangnam Style"	Psy	
Week 44 (October 30)	"I Cry"	Flo Rida		Week 44	"Skyfall"	Adele	
Week 45 (November 6)	"Diamonds"	Rihanna		Week 45	"Skyfall"	Adele	
Week 46 (November 13)	"Diamonds"	Rihanna		Week 46	"Skyfall"	Adele	
Week 47 (November 20)	"Diamonds"	Rihanna		Week 47	"Skyfall"	Adele	
Week 48 (November 27)	"Puhelinlangat laulaa"	Cheek		Week 48	"Mitä tänne jää"	Erin	
Week 49 (December 4)	"Adventti"	Koti-Viikate-Teollisuus		Week 49	"Mitä tänne jää"	Erin	
Week 50 (December 11)	"Anna mä meen"	Cheek (feat. Jonne Aaron)		Week 50	"Anna mä meen"	Cheek (feat. Jonne Aaron)	
Week 51 (December 18)	"Anna mä meen"	Cheek (feat. Jonne Aaron)		Week 51	"Mitä tänne jää"	Erin	
Week 52 (December 25)	"Mitä tänne jää"	Erin		Week 52	"Mitä tänne jää"	Erin	

The top-ten list of the best-selling 2012 singles in Finland was the following:

Position	Single	Artist(s)	Sales	Reference(s)
1	"Euphoria"	Loreen	11,760	
2	"Frontside Ollie"	Robin	8,079	
3	"Ai Se Eu Te Pego"	Michel Teló	7,389	
4	"Somebody That I Used to Know"	Gotye featuring Kimbra	6,774	
5	"Titanium"	David Guetta featuring Sia	6,534	
6	"Älä tyri nyt"	Jukka Poika	6,509	
7	"Kran Turismo"	JVG featuring Raappana	6,074	
8	"Call Me Maybe"	Carly Rae Jepsen	5,876	
9	"Soutaa huopaa"	Elokuu	5,819	
10	"Vie mut kotiin"	Jesse Kaikuranta	5,731	

== See also ==
- List of number-one albums of 2012 (Finland)
