= List of number-one singles of 2014 (Finland) =

This is the complete list of (physical and digital) number-one singles sold in Finland in 2014 according to the Official Finnish Charts. The list on the left side of the box (Suomen virallinen singlelista, "the Official Finnish Singles Chart") represents physical and digital track sales as well as music streaming, the one in the middle (Suomen virallinen latauslista, "the Official Finnish Download Chart") represents sales of digital tracks and the one on the right side (Suomen virallinen radiosoittolista, "the Official Finnish Airplay Chart") represents airplay.

== Chart history ==
| Official Finnish Singles Chart | | | | Official Finnish Download Chart | | | | Official Finnish Airplay Chart | | | |
| Issue date | Song | Artist(s) | Reference(s) | Issue date | Song | Artist(s) | Reference(s) | Issue date | Song | Artist(s) | Reference(s) |
|---|---|---|---|---|---|---|---|---|---|---|---|
| Week 1 | "Timber" | Pitbull (featuring Kesha) | | Week 1 | "Timber" | Pitbull (featuring Kesha) | | Week 1 | "Selvästi päihtynyt" | Jenni Vartiainen | |
| Week 2 | "Timber" | Pitbull (featuring Kesha) | | Week 2 | "Timber" | Pitbull (featuring Kesha) | | Week 2 | "Selvästi päihtynyt" | Jenni Vartiainen | |
| Week 3 | "Counting Stars" | OneRepublic | | Week 3 | "Timber" | Pitbull (featuring Kesha) | | Week 3 | "Timber" | Pitbull (featuring Kesha) | |
| Week 4 | "Timber" | Pitbull (featuring Kesha) | | Week 4 | "Timber" | Pitbull (featuring Kesha) | | Week 4 | "Timber" | Pitbull (featuring Kesha) | |
| Week 5 | "Timber" | Pitbull (featuring Kesha) | | Week 5 | "Happy" | Pharrell Williams | | Week 5 | "Timber" | Pitbull (featuring Kesha) | |
| Week 6 | "Pummilla Tallinnaan" | Tuomas Kauhanen (featuring Mikko) | | Week 6 | "Happy" | Pharrell Williams | | Week 6 | "Timber" | Pitbull (featuring Kesha) | |
| Week 7 | "Huominen on huomenna" | JVG (featuring Anna Abreu) | | Week 7 | "Huominen on huomenna" | JVG (featuring Anna Abreu) | | Week 7 | "Timber" | Pitbull (featuring Kesha) | |
| Week 8 | "Huominen on huomenna" | JVG (featuring Anna Abreu) | | Week 8 | "Huominen on huomenna" | JVG (featuring Anna Abreu) | | Week 8 | "Let Go" | Redrama (featuring Kristinia DeBarge) | |
| Week 9 | "Huominen on huomenna" | JVG (featuring Anna Abreu) | | Week 9 | "Huominen on huomenna" | JVG (featuring Anna Abreu) | | Week 9 | "Kuka sen opettaa" | Kaija Koo | |
| Week 10 | "Huominen on huomenna" | JVG (featuring Anna Abreu) | | Week 10 | "Happy" | Pharrell Williams | | Week 10 | "Kuka sen opettaa" | Kaija Koo | |
| Week 11 | "Rather Be" | Clean Bandit (featuring Jess Glynne) | | Week 11 | "Happy" | Pharrell Williams | | Week 11 | "Suru on kunniavieras" | Jenni Vartiainen | |
| Week 12 | "Rather Be" | Clean Bandit (featuring Jess Glynne) | | Week 12 | "Happy" | Pharrell Williams | | Week 12 | "Aito rakkaus" | Juha Tapio | |
| Week 13 | "Rather Be" | Clean Bandit (featuring Jess Glynne) | | Week 13 | "Happy" | Pharrell Williams | | Week 13 | "Aito rakkaus" | Juha Tapio | |
| Week 14 | "#SELFIE" | The Chainsmokers | | Week 14 | "Lupaan olla" | Nopsajalka | | Week 14 | "Huominen on huomenna" | JVG (featuring Anna Abreu) | |
| Week 15 | "Rather Be" | Clean Bandit (featuring Jess Glynne) | | Week 15 | "Lupaan olla" | Nopsajalka | | Week 15 | "Kuka sen opettaa" | Kaija Koo | |
| Week 16 | "Summer" | Calvin Harris | | Week 16 | "Lupaan olla" | Nopsajalka | | Week 16 | "Kuka sen opettaa" | Kaija Koo | |
| Week 17 | "Summer" | Calvin Harris | | Week 17 | "Lupaan olla" | Nopsajalka | | Week 17 | "Kuka sen opettaa" | Kaija Koo | |
| Week 18 | "Bad" | David Guetta and Showtek (featuring Vassy) | | Week 18 | "Frozen Ground" | 4Order | | Week 18 | "Lupaan olla" | Nopsajalka | |
| Week 19 | "Bad" | David Guetta and Showtek (featuring Vassy) | | Week 19 | "A Sky Full of Stars" | Coldplay | | Week 19 | "Lupaan olla" | Nopsajalka | |
| Week 20 | "Bad" | David Guetta and Showtek (featuring Vassy) | | Week 20 | "Lupaan olla" | Nopsajalka | | Week 20 | "Lupaan olla" | Nopsajalka | |
| Week 21 | "Bad" | David Guetta and Showtek (featuring Vassy) | | Week 21 | "Frozen Ground" | 4Order | | Week 21 | "Lupaan olla" | Nopsajalka | |
| Week 22 | "Vadelmavene" | Kasmir | | Week 22 | "Frozen Ground" | 4Order | | Week 22 | "Lupaan olla" | Nopsajalka | |
| Week 23 | "Vadelmavene" | Kasmir | | Week 23 | "Frozen Ground" | 4Order | | Week 23 | "Lupaan olla" | Nopsajalka | |
| Week 24 | "Kesärenkaat" | Robin | | Week 24 | "Vadelmavene" | Kasmir | | Week 24 | "Lupaan olla" | Nopsajalka | |
| Week 25 | "Kesärenkaat" | Robin | | Week 25 | "Don't Stop" | 5 Seconds of Summer | | Week 25 | "Lupaan olla" | Nopsajalka | |
| Week 26 | "Vadelmavene" | Kasmir | | Week 26 | "Vadelmavene" | Kasmir | | Week 26 | "Lupaan olla" | Nopsajalka | |
| Week 27 | "Paha poika" | Diandra | | Week 27 | "Kiss Me Kiss Me" | 5 Seconds of Summer | | Week 27 | "Vadelmavene" | Kasmir | |
| Week 28 | "Maradona (kesä '86)" | Teflon Brothers | | Week 28 | "Vadelmavene" | Kasmir | | Week 28 | "Vadelmavene" | Kasmir | |
| Week 29 | "Maradona (kesä '86)" | Teflon Brothers | | Week 29 | "Vadelmavene" | Kasmir | | Week 29 | "Pohjolan tuulet" | Kuningasidea | |
| Week 30 | "Maradona (kesä '86)" | Teflon Brothers | | Week 30 | "Bailando" | Enrique Iglesias (featuring Sean Paul, Gente de Zona and Descemer Bueno) | | Week 30 | "Pohjolan tuulet" | Kuningasidea | |
| Week 31 | "Lovers on the Sun" | David Guetta (featuring Sam Martin) | | Week 31 | "Happy Little Pill" | Troye Sivan | | Week 31 | "Pohjolan tuulet" | Kuningasidea | |
| Week 32 | "Lovers on the Sun" | David Guetta (featuring Sam Martin) | | Week 32 | "Lovers on the Sun" | David Guetta (featuring Sam Martin) | | Week 32 | "Pohjolan tuulet" | Kuningasidea | |
| Week 33 | "Prayer in C" | Lilly Wood and the Prick and Robin Schulz | | Week 33 | "Äärirajoille" | Cheek | | Week 33 | "Pohjolan tuulet" | Kuningasidea | |
| Week 34 | "Prayer in C" | Lilly Wood and the Prick and Robin Schulz | | Week 34 | "Beibi" | Haloo Helsinki! | | Week 34 | "Beibi" | Haloo Helsinki! | |
| Week 35 | "Beibi" | Haloo Helsinki! | | Week 35 | "Beibi" | Haloo Helsinki! | | Week 35 | "Beibi" | Haloo Helsinki! | |
| Week 36 | "Beibi" | Haloo Helsinki! | | Week 36 | "Beibi" | Haloo Helsinki! | | Week 36 | "Beibi" | Haloo Helsinki! | |
| Week 37 | "Prayer in C" | Lilly Wood and the Prick and Robin Schulz | | Week 37 | "Beibi" | Haloo Helsinki! | | Week 37 | "Beibi" | Haloo Helsinki! | |
| Week 38 | "Blame" | Calvin Harris (featuring John Newman) | | Week 38 | "Beibi" | Haloo Helsinki! | | Week 38 | "Eden" | Jenni Vartiainen | |
| Week 39 | "Blame" | Calvin Harris (featuring John Newman) | | Week 39 | "Beibi" | Haloo Helsinki! | | Week 39 | "Eden" | Jenni Vartiainen | |
| Week 40 | "Blame" | Calvin Harris (featuring John Newman) | | Week 40 | "Naurava kulkuri" | Elastinen | | Week 40 | "Eden" | Jenni Vartiainen | |
| Week 41 | "Naurava kulkuri" | Elastinen | | Week 41 | "Naurava kulkuri" | Elastinen | | Week 41 | "Eden" | Jenni Vartiainen | |
| Week 42 | "Beibi" | Haloo Helsinki! | | Week 42 | "Naurava kulkuri" | Elastinen | | Week 42 | "Eden" | Jenni Vartiainen | |
| Week 43 | "Dangerous" | David Guetta (featuring Sam Martin) | | Week 43 | "Naurava kulkuri" | Elastinen | | Week 43 | "Mahdollisuus" | Samuli Edelmann | |
| Week 44 | "Sori" | Paula Vesala | | Week 44 | "Sori" | Paula Vesala | | Week 44 | "Naurava kulkuri" | Elastinen | |
| Week 45 | "Dangerous" | David Guetta (featuring Sam Martin) | | Week 45 | "Peggy" | Elastinen | | Week 45 | "Mahdollisuus" | Samuli Edelmann | |
| Week 46 | "Dangerous" | David Guetta (featuring Sam Martin) | | Week 46 | "Sata kesää, tuhat yötä" | Toni Wirtanen | | Week 46 | "Vihaan kyllästynyt" | Haloo Helsinki! | |
| Week 47 | "Outside" | Calvin Harris (featuring Ellie Goulding) | | Week 47 | "Sori" | Paula Vesala | | Week 47 | "Vihaan kyllästynyt" | Haloo Helsinki! | |
| Week 48 | "Outside" | Calvin Harris (featuring Ellie Goulding) | | Week 48 | "Roy Orbison" | Stig | | Week 48 | "Vihaan kyllästynyt" | Haloo Helsinki! | |
| Week 49 | "Outside" | Calvin Harris (featuring Ellie Goulding) | | Week 49 | "Roy Orbison" | Stig | | Week 49 | "Vihaan kyllästynyt" | Haloo Helsinki! | |
| Week 50 | "Outside" | Calvin Harris (featuring Ellie Goulding) | | Week 50 | "Roy Orbison" | Stig | | Week 50 | "Vihaan kyllästynyt" | Haloo Helsinki! | |
| Week 51 | "Macho Fantastico" | Spekti (featuring Tasis) | | Week 51 (Note: Both songs were ranked as number one.) | "Sinä ansaitset kultaa" | Jari Sillanpää | | Week 51 | "Yksin" | Jonne Aaron | |
| Week 51 | "Macho Fantastico" | Spekti (featuring Tasis) | | Week 51 | "Roy Orbison" | Stig | | Week 51 | "Yksin" | Jonne Aaron | |
| Week 52 | "Macho Fantastico" | Spekti (featuring Tasis) | | Week 52 | "Sinä ansaitset kultaa" | Jari Sillanpää | | Week 52 | "Yksin" | Jonne Aaron | |

== See also ==
- List of number-one albums of 2014 (Finland)
