= List of number-one albums of 2014 (Finland) =

This is the complete list of number-one albums sold in Finland in 2014 according to the Official Finnish Charts compiled by Musiikkituottajat – IFPI Finland. The chart is based on sales of physical and digital albums as well as music streaming (from week 7 onwards).

== Chart history ==
Physical & digital albums
Week	Album	Artist(s)	Reference(s)
Week 1	Vain elämää – Kausi 2	Various artists	
Week 2	Boom Kah	Robin	
Week 3	High Hopes	Bruce Springsteen	
Week 4	High Hopes	Bruce Springsteen	
Week 5	High Hopes	Bruce Springsteen	
Week 6	Terminal 2	Scandinavian Music Group	
Week 7	SLK	Stam1na	
Week 8	Boom Kah	Robin	
Week 9	Elefantti	Happoradio	
Week 10	Voitolla yöhön	JVG	
Week 11	Voitolla yöhön	JVG	
Week 12	Boombox	Robin	
Week 13	Boombox	Robin	
Week 14	Pariah's Child	Sonata Arctica	
Week 15	Nyt kolisee	Various artists	
Week 16	The Life and Times of Scrooge	Tuomas Holopainen	
Week 17	Kuka sen opettaa	Kaija Koo	
Week 18	Kuka sen opettaa	Kaija Koo	
Week 19	Panosvyö	Viikate	
Week 20	Pepe & Saimaa	Pepe Willberg	
Week 21	Ghost Stories	Coldplay	
Week 22	Ghost Stories	Coldplay	
Week 23	Wunderboy	Justimus	
Week 24	Janna	Janna	
Week 25	Ultraviolence	Lana Del Rey	
Week 26	Once More 'Round the Sun	Mastodon	
Week 27	x	Ed Sheeran	
Week 28	Pepe & Saimaa	Pepe Willberg	
Week 29	Redeemer of Souls	Judas Priest	
Week 30	Boombox	Robin	
Week 31	The Voice Kesähitti 2014	Various artists	
Week 32	MNTTT	Eevil Stöö, Aztra and MNTTT	
Week 33	When the Cellar Children See the Light of Day	Mirel Wagner	
Week 34	Blind Rage	Accept	
Week 35	Pale Communion	Opeth	
Week 36	Vain rakkaus	Amadeus Lundberg and Riku Niemi Orchestra	
Week 37	Siren Charms	In Flames	
Week 38	Hehkuva rauta	Elonkerjuu	
Week 39	Jealous Gods	Poets of the Fall	
Week 40	16	Robin	
Week 41	Kiitos ei ole kirosana	Haloo Helsinki!	
Week 42	Kiitos ei ole kirosana	Haloo Helsinki!	
Week 43	Hyvässä ja pahassa	Yö	
Week 44	Kiitos ei ole kirosana	Haloo Helsinki!	
Week 45	Hauras	Hector	
Week 46	Vain elämää – Kausi 3 ilta	various artists	
Week 47	Vain elämää – Kausi 3 ilta	various artists	
Week 48	Vain elämää – Kausi 3 ilta	various artists	
Week 49	Rock or Bust	AC/DC	
Week 50	Vain elämää – Kausi 3 päivä	various artists	
Week 51	16	Robin	
Week 52	Vain elämää – Kausi 3 päivä	various artists	

== See also ==
- List of number-one singles of 2014 (Finland)
