= Sano vaan Tuomas =

2013 studio album by Tuomas Kauhanen

Studio album by Tuomas Kauhanen
- Released: 7 June 2013
- Language: Finnish
- Label: Warner Music Finland
- Producer: MGI, Ola

Sano vaan Tuomas is the first studio album by Finnish rapper Tuomas Kauhanen. Released on 7 June 2013, the album peaked at number 16 on the Finnish Albums Chart.

== Track listing ==
| No. | Title | Length |
|---|---|---|
| 1. | "Kieroon" | 3:17 |
| 2. | "Miksi naiset rakastuu renttuihin?" (featuring Mikko) | 3:10 |
| 3. | "Kova duuni on rahaa" (featuring Mariska) | 3:36 |
| 4. | "Enkeli" (featuring Väinöväinö) | 3:32 |
| 5. | "Vahva" (featuring Redrama) | 3:41 |
| 6. | "Vuoden mies" | 3:35 |
| 7. | "1985" | 3:40 |
| 8. | "Hymyile ja vilkuta" | 3:46 |
| 9. | "Jäätä" (featuring Marja) | 3:31 |
| 10. | "Antaa mennä" (featuring Ola) | 4:00 |
| 11. | "Valoon" | 3:56 |
| 12. | "Miksi naiset rakastuu renttuihin? (Remix)" (featuring Cheek & Elastinen) | 3:28 |

== Charts ==
| Chart (2013) | Peak position |
|---|---|
| Finnish Albums (Suomen virallinen lista) | 16 |

== Release history ==
| Region | Date | Format | Label |
|---|---|---|---|
| Finland | 7 June 2013 | CD, digital download | Warner Music Finland |
