= Collarbone (band) =

Finnish rock band

- Origin: Helsinki, Finland
- Genres: Rock; Alternative rock Hard rock
- Years active: 2000–present
- Labels: Universal Music Group
- Members: Thomas Kirjonen; Janne Suominen; Mikko Merilinna; Matti Piipponen; Janne Sivunen
- Website: collarbone.org

Collarbone is a rock band from Helsinki, Finland, founded in 2000. Influences from alternative rock and hard rock can be heard in the group's music. The band has released two full-length albums.

== Background ==
=== The beginning ===
The four founding members, Thomas Kirjonen, Janne Suominen, Matti Piipponen and Janne Sivunen formed the band in late 2000. The band made three demo recordings and an EP called "Devil in Miss Verril", which was released in 2004. The band signed a record deal with Spinefarm Records after winning Ääni ja Vimma (Sound and Fury), a major Finnish band contest, in 2005.

=== The Back of Beyond ===
The band's debut album, The Back of Beyond, was released in March 2007. It was produced by Jonas Olsson, mixed by Jens Bogren and mastered by Ue Nastasi in Sterling Sound, New York City. The single "The Last Call" was played on Finland's Radio Rock, and was included on the soundtrack of the TV show Äijät on Finnish SubTV.

=== Pretty Dirty ===
In late 2008 the band added to its lineup guitarist Mikko Merilinna, notable for his work in the Finnish metal band April. Collarbone's second album, Pretty Dirty, was recorded in summer 2009, Jonas Olsson again being the producer. Risto Hemmi mixed the record in January 2010 in Finnvox Studios, Helsinki.

The first single from the new album, The Machine, was released in March 2010. The record was released via Universal Music in April 2010.

== Lineup ==
- Thomas Kirjonen – vocals (2000–2011)
- Janne Suominen – guitar (2000–)
- Mikko Merilinna – guitar (2008–)
- Matti Piipponen – bass guitar (2000–)
- Janne Sivunen – drums (2000–)

== Discography ==
=== Albums ===
- The Back of Beyond (2007)
- Pretty Dirty (2010)

=== Singles ===
- The Last Call (2007)
- The Machine (2005)

=== Music videos ===
- Gone (2004)
- The Last Call (2007)
- The Machine (2010)
- The End of The Line (2010)
