= Talent Suomi =

Finnish television series

- Genre: Reality series
- Created by: Simon Cowell
- Presented by: Lorenz Backman (2012); Sebastian Rejman (2012); Jarkko Valtee (2009–2011); Osku Heiskanen (2009–2011); Martti Vannas (2007); Susanna Laine (2007); Heikki Paasonen (2016); Elina Kottonen (2016)
- Judges: Sami Saikkonen (2007–2011); Katja Ståhl (2007–2011); Timo Koivusalo (2007); Jaana Saarinen (2009–2011); Janne Kataja (2012); Maria Sid (2012); Mikko von Hertzen (2012); Sami Hedberg (2016); Jari Sillanpää (2016); Sara Forsberg (2016); Riku Nieminen (2016); David Hasselhoff (Guest; 2016)
- Country of origin: Finland
- No. of series: 5

Production
- Production company: FremantleMedia Finland

Original release
- Network: Nelonen
- Release: September 30, 2007

Talent Suomi ("Finnish Talent" or "Talent Finland") is the Finnish version of the Got Talent format of the program and airs on Nelonen. The idea behind the programme is to search for the most talented and promising entertainment. Talent contest took off for the first time in Finland at the end of September 2007. The programme was originally hosted by Susanna Laine and Martin Coulter and had contemporary magazine editor Katja Ståhl, television presenter and film director Timo Koivusalo, as well as the Finnish National Ballet dancer and choreographer Sami Saikkonen as judges. The prize was €30,000.

Auditions were held in three locations in Tampere, Oulu and Helsinki. Forty talents continued from the qualifiers to the semi-finals, where eight passed on to the finals which aired on 9 December. Spectators had the possibility to vote. Talent Suomi 2007 winner was 18-year-old beat boxer Aleksi Vähäpassi.

== Series ==
=== Series 1 (2007) ===
A total of 40 semi finalists and only eight got to the finals, which was held at the House of Culture in Helsinki.

Contestants	Final Selection of	Talent/Act
Sini Eriksson ja Sonic-koira	Viewer's choice	Dancing dog
Santeri Koivisto	Judge's choice	Fourteen-year-old agility acrobatics
Vilhem and Jay	Viewer's choice	Two men band (Bass & Drums)
Manmeet Singh	Judge's choice	Nine years old Indian dancer
Ramin Sohrab	Viewer's choice	Combat species stage talent
Aleksi Vähäpassi	Judge's choice	Beat boxer (WINNER)
Capoeira Ação Liberdade	Viewer's choice	Five people's capoeira-group
Saara Aalto	Judge's choice	Singer & Pianist

=== Series 2 (2009) ===
The finale was broadcast live on 22 November and the winner was Miikka Mäkelä, or motor skills, Miikka. Second, was ten years old singer Iina Kangasharju. And Markku Laamanen finished third. The finale was watched by over a million viewers, and broke Channel Four's new box office records.

Contestants	Final Selection of	Muuta
Joona Leppälä	Viewer's choice	Ilmaveivaaja
Markku Laamanen	Viewer's choice	Singer
Natural Hype	Judge's choice	Dance
Iina Kangasharju	Viewer's choice	10-year-old Singer
Miikka ”Motoriikka-Miikka” Mäkelä	Viewer's choice	Pantomiimitaiteilija (WINNER)
Will Funk for Food	Judge's choice	Locking-Dance
Flying Circus	Viewer's choice	Indoor Aerobatics Group
Elmeri Rantalainen	Viewer's choice	Tricking (Martial Arts)
Osku ”Matti Nysä” Pienimäki	Judge's choice	11-year-old Matti Näsä -imitator

=== Series 3 (2011) ===
The third series began airing in September 2011 and ended in November of that year. Program presenter as well as the jury remained the same. Initial Qualification was held in Helsinki, Tampere and Kuopio. The final was held in Espoo Barona Arena.

Contestants	Final Selection of	Muuta
Perttu Tuomaala (DJ Preal)	Viewer's choice	DJ-kisaaja
Unito	Judge's choice	Trikkausryhmä
Henriikka Rinne	Judge's choice	Tankotanssija
VIP Bartenders	Viewer's choice	Flairtending-kaksikko (WINNER)
Minimies	Judge's choice	Stand up comedy
Duo Flow	Viewer's choice	Tulitaiteilijat
Jari Tapanainen	Judge's choice	Kahlekuningas / miekannielijä
Jouko Lukkonen	Viewer's choice	Singer
Molly Rosenström	Viewer's choice	Singer
Mika Pennanen & Mija Schrey	Judge's choice	Stunttiduo

=== Series 4 (2012) ===
The fourth series began production in autumn 2012.

=== Series 5 (2016) ===
After a four-year hiatus, the fifth series returned in 2016. Heikki Paasonen and Elina Kottonen hosted the show with Sami Hedberg, Jari Sillanpää, Sara Forsberg, and Riku Nieminen as judges. David Hasselhoff was a guest judge.
