= Järjetön rakkaus =

Single by Jesse Kaikuranta

from the album Vie mut kotiin
- Released: 14 September 2012
- Recorded: 2012
- Genre: Pop
- Length: 4:16
- Label: Universal Music Finland

Jesse Kaikuranta singles chronology
"Vie mut kotiin" (2012)	"Järjetön rakkaus" (2012)	"Näytän sulle rannan" (2013)

"Järjetön rakkaus" (Mindless Love) is the second single release by Finnish singer Jesse Kaikuranta from his first album Vie mut kotiin. It was released as a digital single on 14 September 2012. The accompanying music video was uploaded to YouTube on 14 October 2012.

== Chart performance ==
"Järjetön rakkaus" peaked at number six on the Official Finnish Download Chart and at number 16 on the Finnish Singles Chart.

== Charts ==
Chart (2012)	Peak position
Finland (The Official Finnish Singles Chart)	16
