= Vie mut kotiin =

Studio album by Jesse Kaikuranta
- Released: 2 November 2012
- Recorded: 2012
- Length: 50:15
- Label: Universal Music Finland
- Producer: Matti Mikkola, Eppu Kosonen

Jesse Kaikuranta chronology
Vie mut kotiin (2012)	Vaikka minä muutuin (2013)

Singles from Vie mut kotiin
- 1. "Vie mut kotiin" Released: 24 April 2012; 2. "Järjetön rakkaus" Released: 14 September 2012; 3. "Näytän sulle rannan" Released: 25 January 2013

Vie mut kotiin is the debut studio album by Finnish singer Jesse Kaikuranta. It was released on 2 November 2012. Matti Mikkola and Eppu Kosonen served as producers, while Saara Törmä, Hector, Freeman, Paula Vesala and Kaikuranta himself were among the songwriters.

== Commercial reception ==
The album debuted at number one on the Official Finnish Album Chart. Three singles were released: "Vie mut kotiin", "Järjetön rakkaus" and "Näytän sulle rannan".

== Track listing ==
No.	Title	Length
1.	"Tulva"	4:11
2.	"Kuljit täällä joskus"	3:25
3.	"Näytän sulle rannan"	3:57
4.	"Vie mut kotiin"	4:09
5.	"Tuulen tuomaa"	3:31
6.	"Hän ei enää miettinyt meitä"	4:21
7.	"Hetki"	3:49
8.	"Miljardit tähdistöt"	4:47
9.	"Olen valmis"	4:51
10.	"Järjetön rakkaus"	4:16
11.	"Sun oon"	3:32
12.	"Kauppatori"	5:26

== Charts and certifications ==
=== Charts ===
Chart (2013)	Peak position
Finnish Albums (Suomen virallinen lista)	1

=== Certifications ===
Region	Certification	Certified units/sales
Finland (Musiikkituottajat)	2× Platinum	48,905
