= Remotely Funny =

British children's game show

- Genre: Children's; Game show
- Directed by: Joe Grace; Neil Baldock
- Presented by: SAARA
- No. of series: 2
- No. of episodes: 35

Production
- Executive producers: Helen Soden; Hugh Lawton
- Producers: Erin McPartland (series producer); Findlay McRae
- Running time: 22 minutes
- Production company: Twenty Twenty Kids

Original release
- Network: CBBC
- Release: 13 February 2017 – 16 March 2018

Remotely Funny is a British children's game show hosted by SAARA. The show is produced by Twenty Twenty Kids for CBBC. The show features three children from across the United Kingdom connected remotely via webcam competing in various challenges to win points known as 'Samojis'. The series began on 13 February 2017.

== Format ==
In each episode, there are three contestants (except for the Sibling Special) who take part in games, activities and quizzes to win points known as 'Samojis'. Host Saara Forsberg can also give out 'Samojis' for doing something funny or any other reason. The winner wins a Remotely Funny jumper. The runners up win Remotely Funny merchandise, like a memory stick or highlighter. From Series 2 however, the runners up get a ruskeakastike cap.

=== Rounds ===
Between rounds, Forsberg will also ask a contestant a question about their family. In Series 2, they play bonus games instead.

- "Bedroom Bonanza": Forsberg will read out a description of an item like 'something you would never want to give away' and the contestants must race to find something matching that description in their bedroom. The first person back wins 3 of her 'priceless' Samojis. She may also give Samojis to people that chose something good, so if the description was 'something you would bring on a desert island' and someone brought a water bottle, they would get an extra Samoji.
- "Toilet Takedown": In the first part, Forsberg will read a trivia question like 'How many toilets does Wembley Stadium have?'. The contestant must writer their answer on toilet paper, the contestant with the closest answer wins. In the second part, Forsberg will show the contestants a video on LooTube (a wordplay on YouTube) and ask a question asking what they think is going to happen next. The first person that flushes the toilet gets to answer. In Series 2, Wind-Up Warriors replaces LooTube.
- "Food Flash": Forsberg shows the contestant a picture of a Finnish food dish, then the contestants must then make the food dish they saw. The winner is the contestant's dish is closest to the actual dish. The contestants must also use ruskeakastike, a Finnish gravy and one of Forsberg's favourite foods. They can also win a bonus Samoji if they get their parents to try it.
- "Kitchen Lol-lympics": Introduced in Series 2. The contestants must compete in certain tasks, inside the kitchen, to win certain Samojis.
- "Meet the Family (Remotely Funny Families)": The contestant's parents must finish the lyrics to a famous song or use pedometers and get the most steps while dancing. These are then looped repeatedly.
- "The Decider (Say What You See Moji):" Forsberg shows the contestants a set of 'see mojis', representing a catchphrase, a movie or something else. The contestants must work out what they represent. Then Forsberg reveals the winner. In Series 1, it was played in the living room but in Series 2, it was played in the bedroom.

== Transmissions ==
Series	Start date	End date	Episodes
1	13 February 2017	10 March 2017	20
2	26 February 2018	16 March 2018	15

== Episodes ==
=== Series 1 (2017) ===
No.	Title	Contestants	Winner	Air date
1	Italy	Charlotte, Alex & Catriona	Charlotte	13 February 2017
2	Finland	Leonie, Hope & Molly	Leonie	14 February 2017
3	Netherlands	Ioan & Nate, Molly & Eloise and Karim Zeroual & Lianne	Molly & Eloise	15 February 2017
4	China	Maisie, Aman & Bridie	Bridie	16 February 2017
5	Brazil	Zayd, Erin & Ewan	Erin	17 February 2017
6	Denmark	Eve, Katja & Amy	Amy	20 February 2017
7	India	Tyger, Rocco & Amy	Tyger	21 February 2017
8	Poland	Jessica, Matthew & Emma	Emma	22 February 2017
9	Greece	Finley, Alice & Radzi Chinyanganya	Finley	23 February 2017
10	Austria	Mia, Jenson & Jess	Jess	24 February 2017
11	Sweden	Kiki, Fraser & Nasser	Kiki	27 February 2017
12	Russia	Josh, Sophie & Shanai	Josh	28 February 2017
13	England	Morgan, Sofia & Ollie	Ollie	1 March 2017
14	Scotland	Freddie, Yasmin & Tristan	Yasmin	2 March 2017
15	Spain	Deanna, Mia & Ben Shires	Ben Shires	3 March 2017
16	Japan	Laura, Matthew & Farah	Matthew	6 March 2017
17	Hawaii	Arwen, Daniel & Axelle	Arwen	7 March 2017
18	Thailand	Harry, Thea & Eve	Thea	8 March 2017
19	Germany	Manon, Madeleine & Rion	Madeleine	9 March 2017
20	France	Jennifer, Stella & Rowan	Jennifer	10 March 2017

=== Series 2 (2018) ===
No.	Title	Contestants	Winner	Air date
1	Brokenwind	Grace, Molly & Rhys Stephenson	Grace	26 February 2018
2	Lost	Ayana, Zeph & Olivia	Olivia	27 February 2018
3	Nether Wallop	Emma, Marius & Rosie	Rosie	28 February 2018
4	Donkey Town	Ashley, Freddie & Grish	Ashley	1 March 2018
5	Ugley	Tabby, Lyle & Shazia	Tabby	2 March 2018
6	Giggleswick	Megan, David & Naiara	Naiara	5 March 2018
7	Trump Street	Rhys, Lucy and Paddy Wilde & Matt Smallwood	Paddy Wilde & Matt Smallwood	6 March 2018
8	Scratchy Bottom	Yvie, Gregor & Michelle	Michelle	7 March 2018
9	Ramsbottom	Ariana, Scarlett & Emma	Ariana	8 March 2018
10	Dull	Libby, Joe & Amelia	Joe	9 March 2018
11	Deans Bottom	Alisha, Eve & Ricky Martin	Eve	12 March 2018
12	Barton in the Beans	Aadya, Evan & Kirsty	Kirsty	13 March 2018
13	Great Snoring	Lara, Harley & Aimee	Lara	14 March 2018
14	Splott	Lola, Theo & Beth	Beth	15 March 2018
15	Mumbles	Nerys, Dylan & Hacker T. Dog	Dylan	16 March 2018
