= Parasta just nyt =

Single by Robin featuring Nikke Ankara

from the album 16
- Released: 12 August 2014
- Length: 3:04
- Label: Universal Music Oy

Robin singles chronology
"Kesärenkaat" (2014)	"Parasta just nyt" (2014)	"Paperilennokki" (2014)

Nikke Ankara singles chronology
"Perjantai 13." (2014)	"Parasta just nyt" (2014)	"Spesiaali" (2014)

"Parasta just nyt" is a song by Finnish singer Robin featuring Nikke Ankara. Released on 12 August 2014, the song peaked at number seven on the Finnish Singles Chart.

== Chart performance ==
Chart (2014)	Peak position
Finland (Suomen virallinen lista)	7
