= Yhdessä =

Studio album by Robin
- Released: 9 October 2015
- Label: Universal Music Oy

Robin chronology
16 (2014)	Yhdessä (2015)

Singles from Yhdessä
- 1. "Yö kuuluu meille" Released: 4 September 2015

Yhdessä (Together) is the fifth studio album by Finnish singer Robin. The all duets album was released on 9 October 2015.

== Track listing ==
No.	Title	Length
1.	"Yö kuuluu meille" (featuring Santa Cruz, Nikke Ankara, Brädi & Jussi 69)	3:45
2.	"Samettia" (featuring Vilma Alina)	3:04
3.	"Miten eskimot suutelee?" (featuring Sanni)	3:38
4.	"Milloin nään sut uudestaan?" (featuring Kasmir)	3:50
5.	"Ylitit rajan"	3:11
6.	"Kultakehykset" (featuring Evelina)	3:23
7.	"Onnellinen" (featuring Club for Five)	4:06
8.	"Lentoon" (featuring Tommy Lindgren)	3:03
9.	"Vahva" (Elastinen featuring Robin)	3:39
10.	"Silmät kii" (JVG featuring Robin)	3:25
11.	"Se tunne kun" (featuring Mikael Gabriel)	3:47
12.	"Lapin kesä" (featuring Vesku Loiri)	4:49

== Charts ==
Chart (2015–16)	Peak position
Finnish Albums (Suomen virallinen lista)	1

== Release history ==
Region	Date	Format	Label
Finland	9 October 2015	CD, digital download	Universal Music

== See also ==
- List of number-one albums of 2016 (Finland)
