= Näytän sulle rannan =

Single by Jesse Kaikuranta

from the album Vie mut kotiin
- Released: 25 January 2013
- Recorded: 2012
- Genre: Pop
- Length: 3:57
- Label: Universal Music Finland

Jesse Kaikuranta singles chronology
"Järjetön rakkaus" (2012)	"Näytän sulle rannan" (2013)

"Näytän sulle rannan" ("I Will Show You the Beach") is the third single by Finnish singer Jesse Kaikuranta from his debut album Vie mut kotiin. It was released as a digital single on 25 January 2013.

== Chart performance ==
"Näytän sulle rannan" peaked at number 13 on the Official Finnish Download Chart.

== Charts ==
Chart (2013)	Peak position
Finland (The Official Finnish Download Chart)	13
