= Vadelmavene =

Single by Kasmir
- Released: 4 April 2014
- Genre: Pop
- Length: 3:18
- Label: Universal Music
- Songwriters: Jonas Karlsson, Thomas Kirjonen, Henri Salonen

Music video
- "Vadelmavene" on YouTube

"Vadelmavene" (English: Raspberry Boat) is a Finnish-language song by Finnish pop singer Kasmir. It was released in Finland as the lead single from his upcoming debut studio album on 4 April 2014, by Universal Music. The song debuted at number 7 on the Finnish Singles Chart on the week 16 of 2014 and topped the chart on week 22.

== Charts ==
Chart (2014)	Peak position
Finland (Suomen virallinen lista)	1

== See also ==
- List of number-one singles of 2014 (Finland)
