= Vauvoja =

Single by Kasmir featuring Saara
- Released: 15 May 2015
- Recorded: 2015
- Genre: Pop; funk
- Length: 3:49
- Label: Universal Music Finland
- Songwriters: Kasmir; Saara; Hank Solo; Jonas W. Karlsson; Mikko Kuoppala
- Producers: Kasmir; Saara; Mikko Kuoppala

Kasmir singles chronology
"Ryan Gosling" (2015)	"Vauvoja" (2015)	"Linnuton puu" (2015)

Saara singles chronology
"Ur Cool" (2015)	"Vauvoja" (2015)	"The Urge" (2016)

"Vauvoja" (English: Babies) is a song by Finnish singer Kasmir from his forthcoming second studio album. The song features Finnish singer Saara. It was released on 15 May 2015 through Universal Music Finland, with its official music video being released on 23 May. The song has reached the number-one position on the Finnish downloads and airplay charts, while it's reached the top five on the singles chart. "Vauvoja" is the Kesäkumi song of 2015.

== Composition ==
"Vauvoja" is a pop and funk song that plays for a total of 3:49. It was written by Kasmir, Saara, Hank Solo, Jonas W. Karlsson, and Mikko Kuoppala, while it was produced by Kasmir, Saara, and Kuoppala.

== Music video ==
The song's official music video was released on 23 May 2015 through Universal Music Finland's YouTube channel. It features the two singers swapping traditional gender roles with Kasmir portraying female stereotypes and Saara portraying male stereotypes.

== Charts ==
Chart (2015)	Peak position
Finland (Suomen virallinen lista)	2
Finland Download (Latauslista)	1
Finland Airplay (Radiosoittolista)	1
