= Nikke Ankara =

Finnish rapper

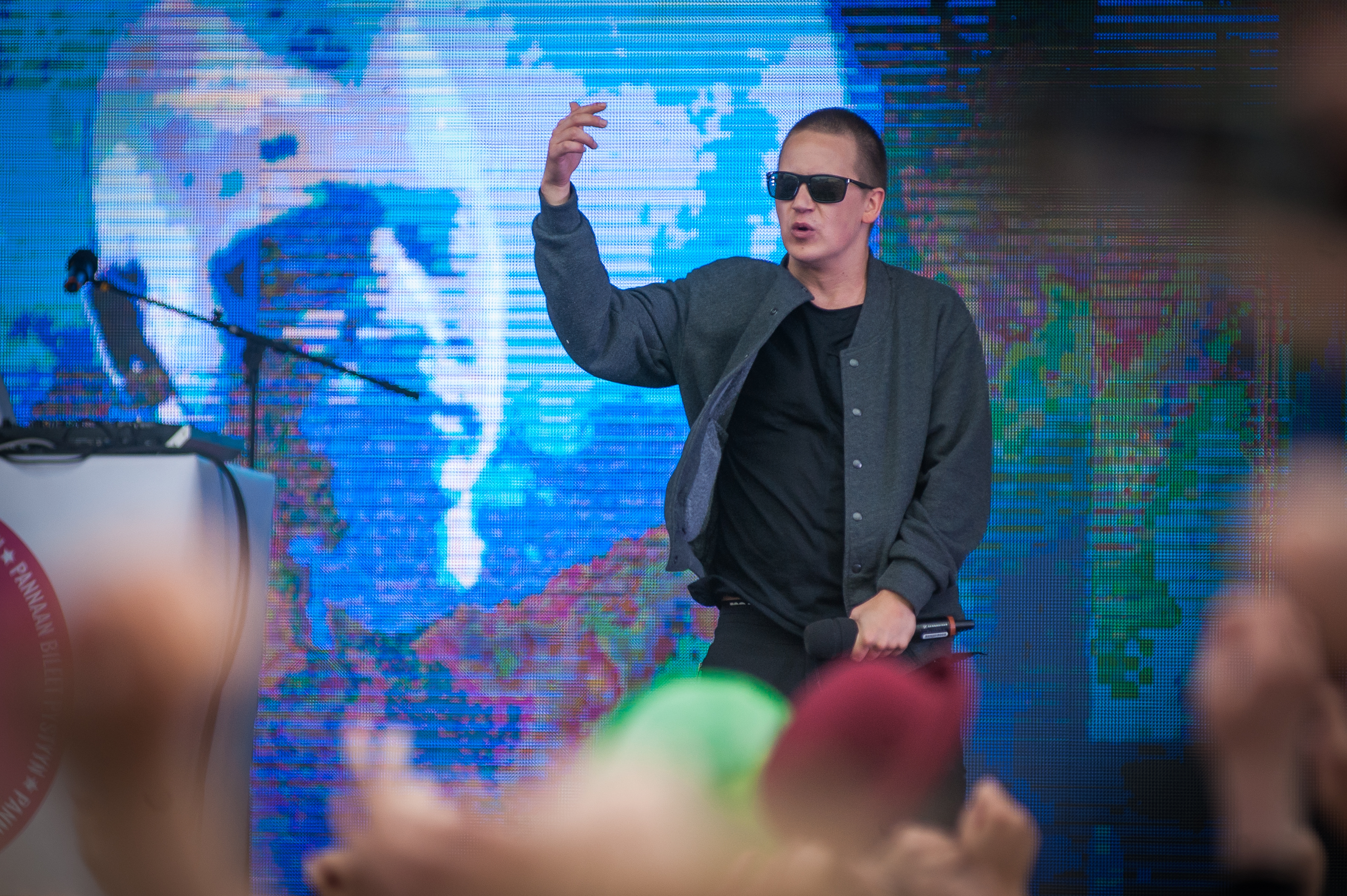
- Nikke Ankara in 2016

Background information
- Born: Niiles Hiirola
- Origin: Lahti, Finland
- Genre: Hip hop
- Occupation: Rapper
- Years active: 2014–present
- Label: Universal Music Finland

Niiles Hiirola, professionally known as Nikke Ankara, is a Finnish rapper. His first single "Perjantai 13.", produced by Henri "MGI" Lanz, was released in May 2014 through Universal Music Finland. He also appears as a featured guest on fellow rapper Brädi's 2014 album III and on Robin's 2014 single "Parasta just nyt".

== Career ==
On 17 January 2015, Hiirola announced that he will be ending his musical career. However, in May 2015 it was reported that he was back in the studio working on new material. His debut album Nikke tulee kotiin was released on 20 November 2015; his second, Ootsä nähny Nikkee, was released in 2018. Hiirola participated in the sixth season of the Finnish music reality show Vain elämää.

== Discography ==
=== Albums ===
Year	Title	Peak position
Year	Title	FIN
2015	Nikke tulee kotiin	5
2018	Ootsä nähny Nikkee	3

=== Singles ===
Year	Title	Peak position	Album
Year	Title	FIN	Album
2014	"Perjantai 13."	9	Nikke tulee kotiin
2014	"Spesiaali"	4	Nikke tulee kotiin
2015	"Koska sä eroot"	5	Nikke tulee kotiin
2015	"Värifilmi" (featuring Aki Tykki)	1	Nikke tulee kotiin
2016	"En tiiä sun nimee" (featuring Ollie)	4	Ootsa nähny Nikkee
2016	"Ettei nyt vaan sattuis mitään"	1	Ootsa nähny Nikkee
2016	"Mona Lisa"	2	Ootsa nähny Nikkee
2016	"Pisamat"	5	Ootsa nähny Nikkee
2017	"Pettävällä jäällä"	1	Vain elämää kausi 6
2017	"Kyyneleet"	10	Vain elämää kausi 6
2017	"Miks ei"	10	Vain elämää kausi 6
2017	"Kaadutaan" (featuring Irina)	5	Ootsä nähny Nikkee
2018	"Rikkinäinen prinsessa"	1	Ootsä nähny Nikkee
2018	"Kiitos ja anteeks"	15	Ootsä nähny Nikkee
2018	"Kappas vaan"	10	TBA
2019	"Tuhat ja yksi yötä"	8	TBA

=== Other charted songs ===
Year	Title	Peak position	Album
Year	Title	FIN	Album
2015	"Rullaa"	4	Nikke tulee kotiin

=== Featured on ===
Year	Title	Peak position	Album
Year	Title	FIN	Album
2014	"Parasta just nyt" (Robin featuring Nikke Ankara)	7	16
2015	"Yö kuuluu meille" (Robin featuring Santa Cruz, Nikke Ankara, Brädi & Jussi 69)	9	Yhdessä
2015	"Me ollaan ne" (Cheek featuring Nikke Ankara)	7	Alpha Omega
2015	"Party (papiidipaadi)" (Antti Tuisku featuring Nikke Ankara)	1	En kommentoi – Deluxe version
