= Vaikka minä muutuin =

Studio album by Jesse Kaikuranta
- Released: 30 October 2013
- Label: Universal Music Finland
- Producer: Matti Mikkola, Eppu Kosonen

Jesse Kaikuranta chronology
Vie mut kotiin (2012)	Vaikka minä muutuin (2013)

Singles from Vie mut kotiin
- 1. "Vielä täällä" Released: 27 September 2013

Vaikka minä muutuin is the second studio album by Finnish singer Jesse Kaikuranta. Produced by Matti Mikkola and Eppu Kosonen, the album was released on 30 October 2013 and peaked at number seven on the Finnish Albums Chart.

== Track listing ==
No.	Title	Length
1.	"Vastaus kaikkeen"	5:55
2.	"Vielä täällä"	4:02
3.	"Kehä"	4:46
4.	"Rakkaus on kuollut"	5:05
5.	"Aivan yhtä yksin"	4:36
6.	"Rauhaa päälle maan"	5:39
7.	"Pettäjä"	3:42
8.	"Tänään"	4:04
9.	"Aina"	4:42
10.	"Neljältä aamulla"	4:19

== Charts and certifications ==
=== Charts ===
Chart (2013)	Peak position
Finnish Albums (Suomen virallinen lista)	7

=== Certifications ===
Region	Certification	Certified units/sales
Finland (Musiikkituottajat)	Gold	19,055

== Release history ==
Region	Date	Format	Label
Finland	30 October 2013	CD, Digital download	Universal Music Finland
