= Ur Cool =

Single by Saara
- Released: 21 April 2015
- Recorded: 2015
- Genre: Pop; bubblegum pop; hip hop
- Length: 2:59
- Label: Capitol Records
- Songwriter(s): Joelle Hadjia; Ronald Jackson; Harmony Smith; Carmen Reece
- Producer(s): Ronald Jackson

Saara singles chronology
"Ur Cool" (2015)	"Vauvoja" (2015)

"Ur Cool" is the debut single by Finnish singer Saara. It was released on 21 April 2015 through Capitol Records, while its lyric video was released on the same day. Upon its release the single reached number-one on the Finnish iTunes top singles list and Spotify Top 50 list.

== Composition ==
"Ur Cool" is a pop song that incorporates elements of bubblegum pop and hip hop and lasts for a total of 2:59. It was written by Joelle Hadjia, Ronald "Jukebox" Jackson, Harmony Smith, and Carmen Reece, and produced by Jackson. The song samples a viral clip from Vine by Elliott Smith.

== Background ==
After posting the viral video "What Languages Sound Like To Foreigners", Saara attracted a large fanbase, amassing over 300,000 subscribers to her channel. She later posted a video titled "One Girl, 14 Genres" which showcased her musical abilities. This video attracted record labels, with her eventually signing to Capitol Records. She then began working on her debut album, with "Ur Cool" being its lead single.

== Music video ==
The song's official music video was released in May 2015.

=== Lyric video ===
The song's official lyric video was released on 21 April 2015 through Saara's VEVO channel. It was directed by Brainbrow and produced by Targa Sahyoun and Lark Content. It features Saara performing the song with various backgrounds depicting locations such as Egypt, Hollywood, Paris, Mexico and Saara's native country Finland, with subtitles of the language spoken in these places.

== Charts ==
=== Weekly charts ===
Chart (2015)	Peak position
Finland (Suomen virallinen lista)	10
