= Wunderboy =

Studio album by Justimus
- Released: 27 May 2014
- Genre: Comedy, rap
- Language: Finnish
- Label: Jiffel Entertainment Oy

Wunderboy is the debut studio album by Finnish sketch comedy and musical trio Justimus, released on 27 May 2014. The album reached number one on the Finnish Albums Chart.

== Track listing ==
| No. | Title | Length |
|---|---|---|
| 1. | "Intro" | 2:05 |
| 2. | "Wunderboy" | 4:12 |
| 3. | "Kaljavauva" | 4:04 |
| 4. | "On Erection" | 3:56 |
| 5. | "Hyvä fiilis" | 3:40 |
| 6. | "Jortsaa" | 3:30 |
| 7. | "Päästä mut pois" | 4:09 |
| 8. | "Paha maailma" | 3:06 |
| 9. | "Juhlitaan" (featuring Tiahu) | 3:04 |
| 10. | "Laulu Salatuille elämille" | 5:53 |

== Charts ==
| Chart (2014) | Peak position |
|---|---|
| Finnish Albums (Suomen virallinen lista) | 1 |

== Release history ==
| Region | Date | Format | Label |
|---|---|---|---|
| Finland | 27 May 2014 | CD, digital download | Jiffel Entertainment Oy |

== See also ==
- List of number-one albums of 2014 (Finland)
