= Jesse Kaikuranta =

Finnish singer (born 1982)

- Birth name: Jesse Kaikuranta
- Born: 13 April 1982 (age 42)
- Origin: Mariehamn, Finland
- Occupation: Singer
- Instrument: Vocals
- Years active: 2012–present
- Labels: Universal Music Finland

Jesse Kaikuranta (born 13 April 1982 in Mariehamn, Åland) is a Finnish singer. He spent his childhood in Ähtäri, but resides in Helsinki. While working as a qualified singing instructor, he took part in The Voice of Finland in 2012, the inaugural season of the show in Finland. In the blind audition stage broadcast on 20 January 2012 he auditioned with "The Edge of Glory" by Lady GaGa. Two of the four judges turned their chairs. He picked Paula Koivuniemi to be his mentor. He proceeded through various stages of the show to reach the Final 4, where he sang "Vie mut kotiin" as his choice for winning single. He finished 3rd/4th with Mikko Sipola winning the title and Saara Aalto as runner-up.

Despite his failure to win the title, Kaikuranta gained great popularity in Finland. He signed with Universal Music Finland and his song "Vie mut kotiin" charted on the Finnish Singles Chart reaching number 11. On the Official Finnish Download Chart, the song peaked at number one.

His debut album, also titled Vie mut kotiin, was released on 2 November 2012 and went straight to number one on the Official Finnish Album Chart selling platinum. The album was produced by Matti Mikkola and Eppu Kosonen and includes work by Aki Tykki, DJPP, Paula Vesala, Freeman and Hector. The follow-up single "Järjetön rakkaus" was released on 14 September 2012 and the third single "Näytän sulle rannan" on 25 January 2013.

Kaikuranta released his second album Vaikka minä muutuin on 30 October 2013.

== Discography ==
=== Albums ===
Year	Title	Peak position	Certification
Year	Title	FIN	Certification
2012	Vie mut kotiin	1	Platinum
2013	Vaikka minä muutuin	7	–
2016	Jesse Kaikuranta	40	–

=== Singles ===
Year	Title	Peak position	Album
Year	Title	FIN	Album
2012	"Vie mut kotiin"	11	Vie mut kotiin
2012	"Järjetön rakkaus"	16	Vie mut kotiin
2013	"Näytän sulle rannan"	–	Vie mut kotiin
2013	"Hän ei enää miettinyt meitä"	–	Vie mut kotiin
2013	"Vielä täällä"	–	Vaikka minä muutuin
