= Vie mut kotiin (song) =

Single by Jesse Kaikuranta

from the album Vie mut kotiin
- Released: 24 April 2012
- Recorded: 2012
- Length: 4:09
- Label: Universal Music Finland
- Songwriters: Eppu Kosonen, Saara Törmä

Jesse Kaikuranta singles chronology
"Vie mut kotiin" (2012)	"Järjetön rakkaus" (2012)

"Vie mut kotiin" ('Take Me Home') is the first single by Finnish singer Jesse Kaikuranta from his similarly titled debut album Vie mut kotiin. It was released as a single on 24 April 2012. The accompanying music video was uploaded to YouTube on 4 June 2012.

== Chart performance ==
"Vie mut kotiin" peaked at number one on the Official Finnish Download Chart and at number 11 on the Finnish Singles Chart.

== Chart performance ==
Chart (2012)	Peak position
Finland (The Official Finnish Singles Chart)	11
