= Risto Hemmi =

Finnish music industry executive

Risto Hemmi (born 1956, Kuopio) is a prominent figure in the Finnish music industry. For a long time, he was the CEO of Finland's largest recording studio, Finnvox Studios, and is still a board member and one of the owners. Hemmi began his career at Finnvox in 1979 and has worked in various capacities such as a sound engineer, mixer, and studio manager. He served as the CEO of the studio from 1993 to 2021. Also, all of Finnvox's 13 studios have been designed by Hemmi.

One of Hemmi's early commercially successful works was the Pelle Miljoona Oy's album "Moottoritie on kuuma" (1980). Hemmi has recorded and mixed over 500 albums, many of which have achieved gold or platinum status. In addition to his work in the studio, Hemmi has also contributed to the film industry by recording and mixing music for about thirty films, including the 2014 film Big Game, directed by Jalmari Helander and starring Samuel L. Jackson.

Hemmi has also worked on immersive spatial audio over his career, from the first four-channel sound of the 1982 film the Worthless to today’s Dolby Atmos productions – becoming a leading expert in the field.

Hemmi was born in Kuopio and spent his childhood in Rovaniemi and Kemi. During his high school years in Kemi, Hemmi played guitar in a band called Fugging Great, which opened for now iconic bands such as Hurriganes and Rauli Badding Somerjoki. Hemmi graduated as a Master of Science in Engineering from the Helsinki University of Technology. Since 2013, he has been teaching master's level courses in music technology at the Sibelius Academy of the University of the Arts.

== Accolades ==
- In 2013, Hemmi was honored at the Music x Media (former Musiikki & Media) event with a lifetime achievement award for his contributions to the Finnish music industry.
- In 2015, he received the Prix Elvis award from the Finnish composers and lyricists association, Elvis ry, recognizing his significant contributions to the Finnish music industry.
- in 2026, Hemmi was awarded the Special Emma Award in recognition of his long-standing career and pivotal role as an influencer in the music industry and developer of Finland’s recording industry.

== Discography ==
=== Studio albums ===
- The Album (2023)

=== Extended Plays ===
- Arctic Circle / Twilight Reflection (2023)

=== Singles ===
- Grandpa's Karelian Lullaby (2024)
