= Boom Kah (song) =

Single by Robin featuring Mikael Gabriel and Uniikki

from the album Boom Kah
- Language: Finnish
- Released: 30 August 2013
- Genre: Pop
- Length: 3:14
- Label: Universal Music Oy

Robin singles chronology
| "Haluan sun palaavan" (2013) | "Boom Kah" (2013) | "Erilaiset" (2013) |

Mikael Gabriel singles chronology
| "Päästä mut pois" (2013) | "Boom Kah" (2013) |

Uniikki singles chronology
| "Kotka" (2012) | "Boom Kah" (2013) |

"Boom Kah" is a song by Finnish singer Robin featuring Mikael Gabriel and Uniikki. Released on 30 August 2013, the song is the first single from Robin's third studio album Boom Kah. The song peaked at number four on the Finnish Singles Chart.

== Chart performance ==
| Chart (2013) | Peak position |
|---|---|
| Finland (Suomen virallinen lista) | 4 |
