= Sara Forsberg =

Finnish singer-songwriter and YouTuber (born 1994)

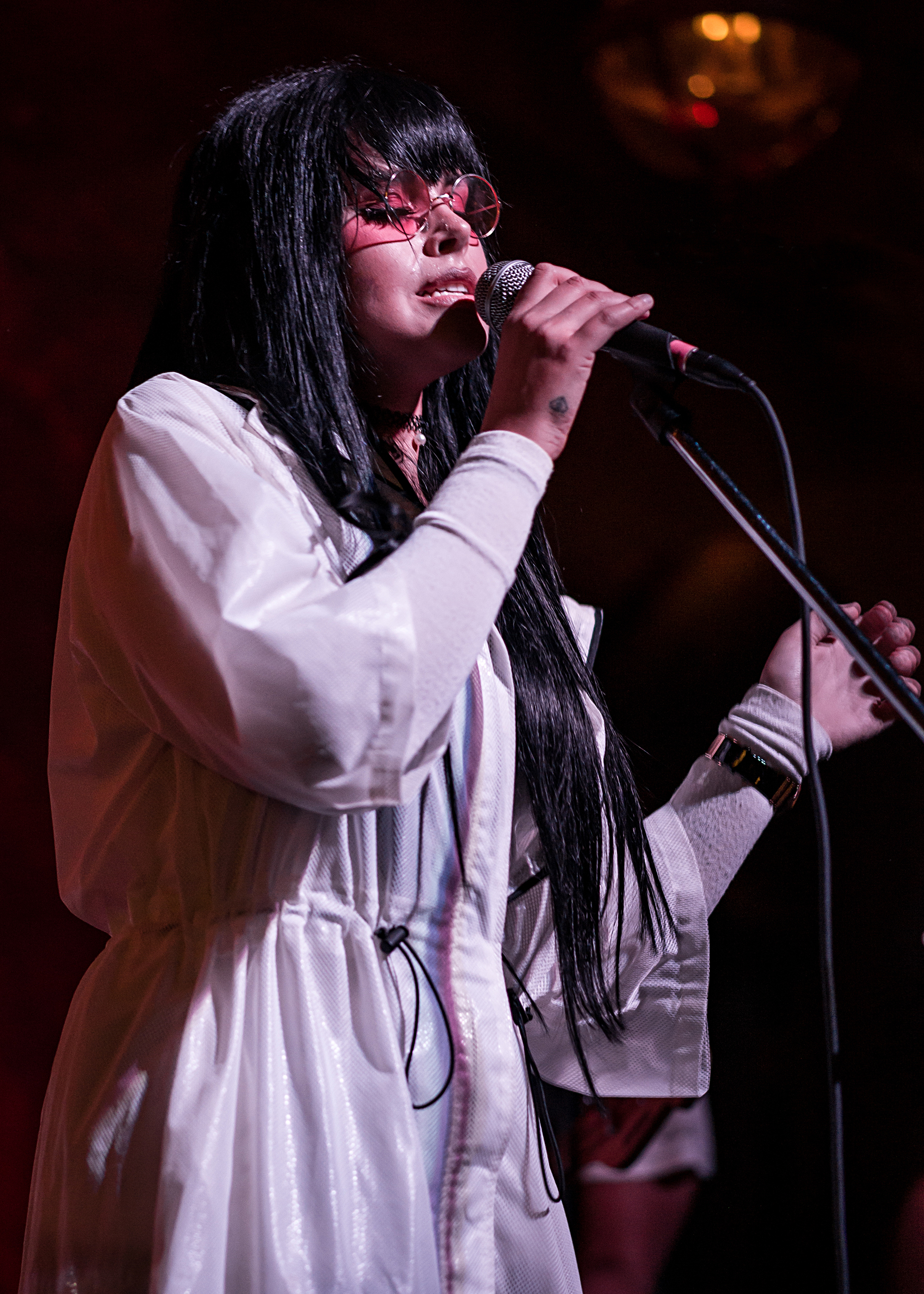
- Forsberg performing in 2016

Background information
- Also known as: SAARA; Smokahontas; Smoukahontas; Smo
- Born: Sara Maria Forsberg; 2 May 1994 (age 32); Jakobstad, Finland
- Genres: Pop; R&B; dance-pop
- Occupations: Singer; songwriter; YouTube personality; television presenter
- Instrument: Vocals
- Years active: 2014–present
- Labels: Capitol; Universal Music Finland

YouTube information
- Channel: Sara Forsberg
- Genres: Comedy; music; vlogging
- Subscribers: 1.12 million
- Views: 148 million
- Last updated: 19 June 2026

Sara Maria Forsberg (Finnish pronunciation: [ˈsɑrɑ ˈmɑriɑ ˈforsbærj]; born 2 May 1994), formerly known professionally as SAARA, Smo, Smoukahontas, or Smokahontas, is a Finnish singer, songwriter, YouTube personality, and television presenter. As a singer, Forsberg was signed to Capitol Records in 2014 and released her debut single "Ur Cool" in April 2015, which went on to become a top ten hit in her home country of Finland. She left in early 2016 after disagreements with the label and her producer. Forsberg has continued to release music as an independent artist in affiliation with Universal Music Group. As of November 2017, her YouTube channel has more than a million subscribers and over 100 million views.

== Early and personal life ==
Forsberg was born on 2 May 1994 in Jakobstad, Finland. Her father was born in Sweden. Her native language is Finnish, although she spoke mainly English in the first six years of her life as she lived abroad with her family; due to her parents' careers as Baptist missionaries, she moved frequently as a child, living in Texas for five years and the United Kingdom for a year, before returning to Finland permanently. Forsberg spent a few years in a music academy in Jakobstad and later studied to become a chef before embarking on a singing career.

In October 2023, Forsberg revealed that she was born intersex and had been diagnosed with Swyer syndrome as a teenager. Earlier in 2016, she revealed she has breast implants.

== Career ==
=== Starting from YouTube ===
Since her video "What Languages Sound Like to Foreigners" was posted on YouTube on 3 March 2014 on her channel Smoukahontas Official (which subsequently has been changed into SAARA), it has been seen over 20 million times as of June 2018. Her ability to mimic accents and speech melodies of different languages, which included Japanese, Estuary English, American with California accent, Swedish, French, Arabic and Spanish, using mainly nonexistent words, was praised by media in a number of countries.

In the first sequel, she re-impersonated some of the languages from the initial video and added new ones, including "Something African" and "Scottish". In another sequel, her "One Girl, 14 Genres" video, a number of musical genres were mimicked.

=== Musical career ===
In July 2014, it was revealed that Forsberg had signed a record deal with Capitol Records with Rodney Jerkins acting as her executive producer. Capitol Records chairman and CEO Steve Barnett said that the only artists that he had the same feeling about other than Forsberg were Adele and Sam Smith. She is the first Finnish person to be signed to a major American record label. Her debut single "Ur Cool" was released on 21 April 2015 and became a Top 10 single in Finland. In February 2016, Forsberg left Capitol Records. She told in her YouTube video that the producer Jerkins had left Capitol Records and she was left stranded, contractually not being allowed to work without him. Owing to the unwillingness of the producer to let her out of the contract, Capitol Records agreed to terminate her contract and let her go create freely again. Saara also said in the video that she felt bad promoting a single she absolutely hated.

In April 2016, Saara's manager Johannes Ylinen announced that Saara had signed with Universal Music Group, with which she would continue releasing music independently. Forsberg released her debut EP Hello I'm Saara on 27 May 2016. The EP's lead single, "The Urge", was released in June 2016.

In 2017, Saara published three singles: in February, "Permission to Love"; in March, "Superpowers"; and in October, the single "All the Love ft. Jillionaire".

On 2 May 2018, her birthday, Saara released her second album Almost Acoustic EP with four new songs and one remix. On the same day she also had her first YouTube live concert.

Forsberg also writes music for other artists. In July 2015, it was revealed that Forsberg has writing credit for the K-pop band Girls' Generation song "You Think" in their album Lion Heart. The song charted on Billboard's digital song list at nr. 3 September 2015. In 2016, Forsberg co-wrote the song "My Heart Wants Me Dead" by Lisa Ajax for Melodifestivalen 2016, as well as the song "Drip Drop" by Taemin from his second solo album Press It.

In June 2015, Forsberg was featured on the song "Vauvoja" by Finnish singer Kasmir. The song went on to reach number-one on the Finnish downloads and airplay charts. In the summer of 2017 Saara was featured on the song "Can't Buy Love" by THRDL!FE.

=== In TV and film ===
In April 2014, Forsberg signed a development deal with production/distribution company Omnivision Entertainment/My Damn Channel. In May 2014, Forsberg relocated to Los Angeles to perform on a YouTube channel affiliated with My Damn Channel called "WestToastTV" in addition to maintaining her own personal channel.

In October 2014, it was revealed that Forsberg has a small role in the Hong Kong-Chinese-American film Skiptrace directed by Finnish director Renny Harlin.

In December 2015, the news broke that Forsberg had spent the last 18 months working with Lucasfilm and was the creator of an alien language used in Star Wars: The Force Awakens. In July 2016, it was revealed that Forsberg had created another alien language for a Hollywood film, this time for the film Star Trek Beyond, in which she has also a minor voice role as an alien named Kalara.

In 2016, Forsberg worked as a judge on the fifth season of Talent Suomi, the Finnish version of Got Talent.

On 5 February 2017, a new Finnish game show called Kaikki vastaan 1 ("Everyone Against 1") began airing live on Sunday evenings on the Finnish network, Nelonen TV, with Forsberg as a co-host. The first season ran until 9 April 2017. Also, in February 2017, Forsberg began hosting Remotely Funny, a British game show on CBBC.

In 2018, Forsberg went on appearing on Finnish TV, in spring on the contest Pallon ympäri ("Around The Globe"), where she has been travelling around the world by performing tasks as one of the three competitors. She has been told to go on co-hosting again the studio contest Kaikki vastaan 1 in autumn 2018.

== In media ==
Forsberg was interviewed on British BBC Radio, Finnish public radio Yle and Swedish TV in which she confirmed that she was contacted by a producer from The Ellen DeGeneres Show. For approximately 180 seconds, she was a guest on the show on 7 April 2014 and she took home a tripod and a camera as a gift from DeGeneres. The trip was documented in a short series titled Sara Goes LA which was produced by Finnish broadcaster MTV and has also been published on YouTube since.

== Other projects ==
Forsberg announced her new clothing line FRSBRG in May 2015 and advertised it to her Finnish viewers with a number of well known celebrities from her home country. It was planned to be released in November the same year.

== Discography ==
=== Extended plays ===
- Hello I'm Saara (2016)
- Almost Acoustic (2018)

=== Singles ===
| Year | Single | Peak chart positions | Album |
| Year | Single | FIN | Album |
|---|---|---|---|
| 2015 | "Ur Cool" | 10 | Non-album single |
| 2016 | "The Urge" | — | Hello I'm Saara |
| 2016 | "Honey" (featuring Rich the Kid) | — | Hello I'm Saara |
| 2017 | "Permission to Love" | — | Non-album single |
| 2017 | "Superpowers" | — | Non-album single |
| 2017 | "All the Love" (featuring Jillionaire) | — | Non-album single |
| 2018 | "Sangria" | — | Non-album single |

==== Featured ====
| Year | Single | Peak chart positions | Album |
| Year | Single | FIN | Album |
|---|---|---|---|
| 2015 | "Vauvoja" (Kasmir featuring Saara) | 2 | Non-album single |
| 2015 | "Whatcha Waitin On" (Tay Jasper featuring Saara) | — | Non-album single |
| 2017 | "Can't Buy Love" (THRDL!FE featuring Saara) | — | Non-album single |

=== Writing credits ===
| Year | Song | Album | Artist | Cowriters |
|---|---|---|---|---|
| 2015 | "Vauvoja" | —N/a | Kasmir feat. Saara | Kasmir, Hank Solo, Jonas W. Karlsson, Mikko Kuoppala |
| 2015 | "You Think" | Lion Heart | Girls Generation | Cho Yoon-kyung, Dante Jones, Brandon Sammon, Denzil "DR" Remedios, Ryan S. Jhun, Jussi Ilmari Karvinen |
| 2016 | "My Heart Wants Me Dead" | Collection | Lisa Ajax | Anton Hård af Segerstad, Linnea Deb, Joy Deb, Nikki Flores |
| 2016 | "The 7th Sense" | NCT 2018 Empathy | NCT U | Timothy "Bos" Bullock, Tay Jasper, Adrian Mckinnon, Michael Jiminez, Leven Kali |
| 2016 | "I Just Wanna Dance" | I Just Wanna Dance | Tiffany | Timothy "Bos" Bullock, Michael Jiminez, MZMC |
| 2016 | "Starlight" | Why | Taeyeon and Dean | Lee Seu-ran, Jamil "Digi" Chammas, Taylor Mckall, Tay Jasper, Adrian McKinnon, Leven Kali, MZMC |
| 2016 | "Drip Drop" | Press It | Taemin | Park Sunghee, Jamil Chammas, Tay Jasper, Jonathan Perkins, Michael Jiminez, Leven Kali, MZMC |
| 2016 | "Keep On Doin' | Free Somebody | Luna | Le`mon, JQ, Bae Seong-hyeon, Anton Malmberg Hård af Segerstad, Joy Neil Mitro Deb, Linnea Mary Han Deb |
| 2017 | "Rookie" | Rookie | Red Velvet | Jamil "Digi" Chammas, Leven Kali, Karl Powell, Harrison Johnson, Russell Steedle, MZMC, Otha "Vakseen", Davis III, Tay Jasper |
| 2018 | "RBB (Really Bad Boy)" | RBB | Red Velvet | Kenzie, Timothy 'Bos' Bullock, MZMC |
| 2018 | "Nega Dola" | One Shot, Two Shot | BoA | JQ, Kang Eun-yoo, On-gyul, Hyun Ji-wo, BoA, Afshin Salmani, Josh Cumbee, Yoo Young-jin, AFSHeeN |
| 2018 | "Countless" | The Story of Light: Epilogue | SHINee | Jeon Gandi, Jamil "Digi" Chammas, Adrian McKinnon, Tay Jasper, Leven Kali, MZMC, Yoo Young-jin |
| 2024 | "No Clue" | Walk | NCT 127 | Mike Daley, Mitchell Owens, Wilbart "Vedo" McCoy III, Tay Jasper, Adrian Mckinnon, Michael Jiminez |
| 2025 | "Style" | Focus | Hearts2Hearts | Mike Daley, Mitchell Owens, Adrian McKinnon,Kenzie |

== Filmography ==
| Year | Title | Role | Notes |
|---|---|---|---|
| 2014 | The Ellen DeGeneres Show | Herself | Guest |
| 2014 | Sara Goes LA | Herself | Reality show |
| 2014, 2015 | Posse | Herself | Talk show (seasons 1, 2) |
| 2016 | Talent Suomi | Herself | Judge (season 5) |
| 2016 | Skiptrace | Natalya | Movie |
| 2016 | Star Trek Beyond | Kalara (voice) | Movie |
| 2017 | Kaikki vastaan 1 | Herself | Co-host (season 1, 10 episodes) |
| 2017–2018 | Remotely Funny | Herself | Host (35 episodes) |
