= Tuomas Kauhanen =

Finnish rapper

- Also known as: Eflekti (2003–2005); Efu (2005-2011); Tuomas Kauhanen (2011-present)
- Born: 1985 (age 40–41); Porvoo, Finland
- Genre: Hip hop
- Years active: 2003–present

Tuomas Kauhanen (born 1985 in Porvoo, Finland) is a Finnish rapper based in Helsinki.

== Career ==
Kauhanen started his career in the early 2000s in Näkökulma. The band released their album Tulikaste in 2003. In the album, Kauhanen used the stage name Eflekti. He then formed Area 04 Fam that also included Doon and MGI (Henri Lanz). The band released the album Kovalla maalla in 2006. In Area 04 Fam, he shortened his name to Efu.

As these band projects were put on hold, he started a solo career in 2010-2011 posting "Asenneongelma" and "Kulutusjuhlat" online on his SoundCloud page and later on YouTube. A single from an upcoming album was released in April 2012 called "1985" with an accompanying music video. A second release from the album was "Miksi naiset rakastuu renttuihin?" in August 2012. His debut solo album Sano vaan Tuomas was released on 7 June 2013 where he used his actual name Tuomas Kauhanen alongside the third single "Enkeli" that featured the vocals of Väinöväinö. The single became the Finnish Official Summer Hit title in 2013.

== Discography ==
=== Albums ===
| Year | Album | Peak positions |
| Year | Album | FIN |
|---|---|---|
| 2013 | Sano vaan Tuomas | 16 |

=== Singles ===
| Year | Single | Peak positions | Album |
| Year | Single | FIN | Album |
|---|---|---|---|
| 2012 | "Asenneongelma" | – | Sano vaan Tuomas |
| 2012 | "Miksi naiset rakastuu renttuihin?" | – | Sano vaan Tuomas |
| 2013 | "Enkeli" (feat. Väinöväinö) | 2 | Sano vaan Tuomas |
| 2014 | "Pummilla Tallinnaan" (featuring Mikko) | 1 | TBA |
| 2016 | "Paita Kattoon" | 8 | TBA |
