= Enkeli =

Single by Tuomas Kauhanen featuring Väinöväinö
- Released: April 2013
- Recorded: 2013
- Genre: Hip hop, reggae
- Length: 3:13
- Label: Warner Music Finland
- Songwriters: Tuomas Kauhanen, Henri Lanz, Fridolin Nordsø, Shaka Loveless, Väinö Wallenius

Tuomas Kauhanen singles chronology
"Miksi naiset rakastuu renttuihin?" (2012)	"Enkeli" (2013)	"Pummilla Tallinnaan" (2014)

Väinöväinö singles chronology
"Enkeli" (2013)

Music video
- "Enkeli" on YouTube

"Enkeli" is a 2013 song by Finnish rapper Tuomas Kauhanen featuring Väinöväinö. The song peaked at number two on the Finnish Singles Chart.

== Chart performance ==
Chart	Peak position
Finland (Suomen virallinen lista)	2
