= Pummilla Tallinnaan =

Single by Tuomas Kauhanen featuring Mikko
- Released: 24 January 2014
- Recorded: 2014
- Genre: Hip hop, rap
- Length: 3:21
- Label: Warner Music Finland

Tuomas Kauhanen singles chronology
"Enkeli" (2013)	"Pummilla Tallinnaan" (2014)

Mikko singles chronology
"Pummilla Tallinnaan" (2014)

Music video
- "Pummilla Tallinnaan" on YouTube

"Pummilla Tallinnaan" is a song by Finnish rapper Tuomas Kauhanen featuring Mikko (full name Mikko Björk). The song peaked at number one on the Finnish Singles Chart.

== Chart performance ==
Chart	Peak position
Finland (Suomen virallinen lista)	1
