= Kesärenkaat =

Single by Robin

from the album 16
- Released: 1 June 2014
- Length: 3:04
- Label: Universal Music Oy

Robin singles chronology
| "Tilttaamaan (Beats & Styles Remix)" (2014) | "Kesärenkaat" (2014) | "Parasta just nyt" (2014) |

"Kesärenkaat" is a song by Finnish pop singer Robin. Released on 1 June 2014, the song peaked at number one on the Finnish Singles Chart.

== Chart performance ==
| Chart (2014) | Peak position |
|---|---|
| Finland (Suomen virallinen lista) | 1 |
