= List of number-one singles of 2014 (Poland) =

This is a list of the songs that reached number-one position in official Polish single chart in ZPAV in 2014.

== Chart history ==
Issue Date	Song	Artist(s)	Reference(s)
January 4	"The Monster"	Eminem featuring Rihanna	
January 11	"The Monster"	Eminem featuring Rihanna	
January 18	"Hey Brother"	Avicii	
January 25	"Something I Need"	OneRepublic	
February 1	"Something I Need"	OneRepublic	
February 8	"Happy"	Pharrell Williams	
February 15	"Happy"	Pharrell Williams	
February 22	"Happy"	Pharrell Williams	
March 1	"Jubel"	Klingande	
March 8	"Happy"	Pharrell Williams	
March 15	"Happy"	Pharrell Williams	
March 22	"Changes"	Faul & Wad Ad vs. Pnau	
March 29	"Stolen Dance"	Milky Chance	
April 5	"Stolen Dance"	Milky Chance	
April 12	"Addicted to You"	Avicii	
April 19	"Stolen Dance"	Milky Chance	
April 26	"Stolen Dance"	Milky Chance	
May 3	"Stolen Dance"	Milky Chance	
May 10	"Rather Be"	Clean Bandit feat. Jess Glynne	
May 17	"Dark Horse"	Katy Perry feat. Juicy J	
May 24	"Rather Be"	Clean Bandit feat. Jess Glynne	
May 31	"Rather Be"	Clean Bandit feat. Jess Glynne	
June 7	"Na chwilę"	Grzegorz Hyży & Tabb	
June 14	"Waves" (Robin Schulz remix)	Mr Probz	
June 21	"Am I Wrong"	Nico & Vinz	
June 28	"Am I Wrong"	Nico & Vinz	
July 5	"Am I Wrong"	Nico & Vinz	
July 12	"Am I Wrong"	Nico & Vinz	
July 19	"Is it Right"	Elaiza	
July 26	"Nobody to Love"	Sigma	
August 2	"Nobody to Love"	Sigma	
August 9	"Przyjdzie taki dzień"	Kasia Popowska	
August 16	"Chandelier"	Sia	
August 23	"Stay with Me"	Sam Smith	
August 30	"Prayer in C"	Lilly Wood & the Prick and Robin Schulz	
September 6	"Prayer in C"	Lilly Wood & the Prick and Robin Schulz	
September 13	"Prayer in C"	Lilly Wood & the Prick and Robin Schulz	
September 20	"Prayer in C"	Lilly Wood & the Prick and Robin Schulz	
September 27	"Prayer in C"	Lilly Wood & the Prick and Robin Schulz	
October 4	"Prayer in C"	Lilly Wood & the Prick and Robin Schulz	
October 11	"Rude"	Magic!	
October 18	"Rude"	Magic!	
October 25	"All About That Bass"	Meghan Trainor	
November 1	"Shake It Off"	Taylor Swift	
November 8	"Shake It Off"	Taylor Swift	
November 15	"All About That Bass"	Meghan Trainor	
November 22	"Habits (Stay High)" (Hippie Sabotage remix)	Tove Lo	
November 29	"Habits (Stay High)" (Hippie Sabotage remix)	Tove Lo	
December 6	"Habits (Stay High)" (Hippie Sabotage remix)	Tove Lo	
December 13	"Habits (Stay High)" (Hippie Sabotage remix)	Tove Lo	
December 20	"Dangerous"	David Guetta feat. Sam Martin	
December 27	"Dangerous"	David Guetta feat. Sam Martin	

== Number-one artists ==
Position	Artist	Weeks at #1
1	Lilly Wood & the Prick	6
1	Robin Schulz	6
2	Pharrell Williams	5
2	Milky Chance	5
3	Nico & Vinz	4
3	Tove Lo	4
4	Clean Bandit	3
4	Jess Glynne (as featuring)	3
5	Eminem	2
5	Rihanna (as featuring)	2
5	OneRepublic	2
5	Avicii	2
5	Sigma	2
5	Magic!	2
5	Taylor Swift	2
5	Meghan Trainor	2
5	David Guetta	2
5	Sam Martin (as featuring)	2
6	Klingande	1
6	Faul & Wad Ad	1
6	Pnau	1
6	Katy Perry	1
6	Juicy J (as featuring)	1
6	Grzegorz Hyży	1
6	Tabb (as featuring)	1
6	Mr Probz	1
6	Elaiza	1
6	Kasia Popowska	1
6	Sia	1
6	Sam Smith	1

== See also ==
- Polish Music Charts
- List of number-one albums of 2014 (Poland)
