= 16 (Robin album) =

Studio album by Robin
- Released: 22 September 2014
- Length: 32:19
- Label: Universal Music Oy

Robin chronology
Boombox (2014)	16 (2014)	Yhdessä (2015)

Singles from 16
- 1. "Kesärenkaat" Released: 1 June 2014; 2. "Parasta just nyt" Released: 12 August 2014; 3. "Paperilennokki" Released: 3 November 2014

16 is the fourth studio album by Finnish singer Robin, released on 22 September 2014. Two singles preceded the release; "Kesärenkaat" and "Parasta just nyt". The album peaked at number one on the Finnish Albums Chart in October 2014.

== Track listing ==
No.	Title	Length
1.	"Ihan sama vaikka mokaa"	3:11
2.	"Parasta just nyt" (featuring Nikke Ankara)	3:34
3.	"Sua varten"	3:16
4.	"Kuvitellaan"	3:28
5.	"Kesärenkaat"	3:05
6.	"Paperilennokki"	3:12
7.	"Lupaan tulla pelastaa"	3:32
8.	"Frendikortti"	2:52
9.	"Tää on aitoo"	2:56
10.	"Huudan sun nimee" (featuring VilleGalle)	3:13

== Charts ==
Chart (2014)	Peak position
Finnish Albums (Suomen virallinen lista)	1

== Release history ==
Region	Date	Format	Label
Finland	22 September 2014	CD, digital download	Universal Music

== See also ==
- List of number-one albums of 2014 (Finland)
