= Sere (rapper) =

Sere (Seremoniamestari)
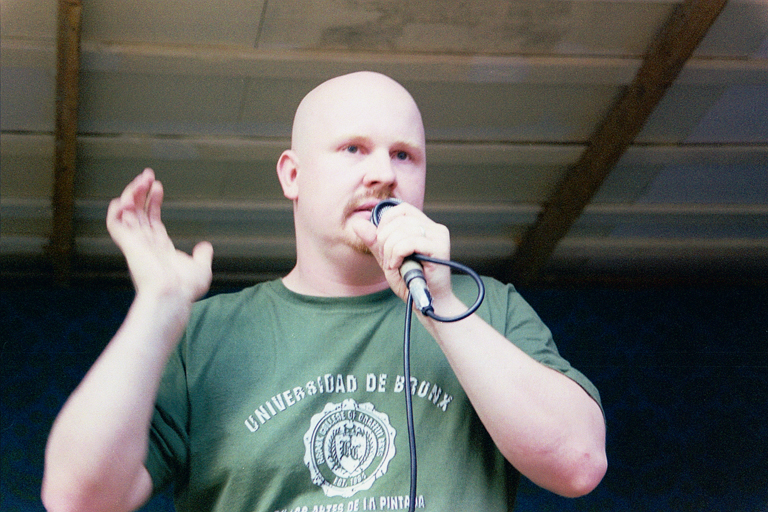
- Sere performing in 2004

Background information
- Also known as: Toinen poski Seremoniamestari (until 2003); Sere (2003-present)
- Born: Matti Huhta; 1976 (age 49–50); Espoo, Finland
- Genre: Hip hop
- Occupations: Rapper; poet; singer
- Years active: 2003–present

Matti Huhta (born 1976 in Espoo, Finland) better known by his stage name Seremoniamestari is a Finnish rapper and poet. Seremoniamestari is Finnish for Master of Ceremonies. In 2003, he shortened his artist name to simply Sere.

== Career ==
He was the first artist to release a Finnish-only rap EP (Edustaa edustaa in 1998) and the first to release a Finnish-only album Omin sanoin in 2000.

At the beginning of his career, Sere became widely known as one of the first Finnish rappers to use multisyllabic rhymes and influenced many Finnish rappers to evolve their rhyming to more complex styles.

== Discography ==
=== Albums ===
Year	Album	Credited to	Peak positions	Certification
Year	Album	Credited to	FIN	Certification
2000	Omin sanoin	Seremoniamestari	7	
2001	Sanasta miestä	Seremoniamestari	14	
2002	Sana viikonvaihteeksi	Seremoniamestari	29	
2003	Vain nimi muuttunut	Sere		
2004	Pari valittua sanaa 2000-2004	Sere		
2005	Perusasioiden äärellä (with SP)	Joint album for Sere & SP		

=== Demos / EPs ===
- 1998: Edustaa edustaa
- 1999: Maan alla
- 1999: Potkin uutta tiedettä

=== Singles ===
Year	Album	Credited to	Peak positions	Album
Year	Album	Credited to	FIN	Album
2000	"Viesti"	Seremoniamestari	3	
2000	"Kappale kauneinta suomiriimiä"	Seremoniamestari	4	
2000	"Ihana päivä"	Seremoniamestari	–	
2001	"Pysähtyy & kysyy"	Seremoniamestari	7	
2002	"Chillaa meiä kanssa"	Seremoniamestari	7	
2002	"Egotrippi"	Seremoniamestari	–	
2003	"Uudestaan" (featuring Nylon Beat)	Sere	17	
