= Justimus =

Finnish sketch comedy and musical group

- Also known as: Justimusfilms
- Origin: Haapavesi, Finland
- Years active: 2009–present
- Members: Sami Harmaala; Juho Nummela; Joose Kääriäinen

Justimus (also known as Justimusfilms) is a Finnish sketch comedy and musical trio consisting of Juho Nummela, Sami Harmaala and Joose Kääriäinen. Formed in 2009, Justimus first gained success with their videos on YouTube and in 2012 appeared on the similarly titled television series. In June 2014, their debut album Wunderboy peaked at number one on the Finnish Albums Chart.

== Charts ==
=== Albums ===
Year	Title	Peak position
Year	Title	FIN
2014	Wunderboy	1

=== Singles ===
Year	Title	Peak position	Album
Year	Title	FIN	Album
2012	"En oo homo" (Justimusfilms + Nost3&Protro)	15	–
2014	"Wunderboy"	14	Wunderboy
