= List of number-one albums of 2014 (Poland) =

This is a list of number-one albums of 2014 in Poland, per the OLiS chart.

== Chart history ==
Issue date	Album	Artist(s)	Reference
2 January	65 Lat Polskiej Piosenki	Various artists	
13 January	Radio Plus: Zawsze w Rytmie	Various artists	
20 January	MTV Unplugged Kult	Kult	
27 January	MTV Unplugged Kult	Kult	
3 February	Siesta 9 – Muzyka Moich Ulic – Prezentuje Marcin Kydryński	Various artists	
10 February	Siesta 9 – Muzyka Moich Ulic – Prezentuje Marcin Kydryński	Various artists	
17 February	The Satanist	Behemoth	
24 February	Dekady Polskiej Ballady	Various artists	
3 March	European Jazz	Various artists	
10 March	Violetta en Vivo	Violetta	
17 March	Kartagina	O.S.T.R. and Marco Polo	
24 March	Passione	Andrea Bocelli	
31 March	Przeboje Muzycznej Jedynki	Various artists	
7 April	Przeboje Muzycznej Jedynki	Various artists	
14 April	A morał tej historii mógłby być taki, mimo że cukrowe, to jednak buraki	Luxtorpeda	
21 April	A morał tej historii mógłby być taki, mimo że cukrowe, to jednak buraki	Luxtorpeda	
28 April	Come Away with Me	Norah Jones	
5 May	Come Away with Me	Norah Jones	
12 May	Smooth Jazz Cafe 13	Various artists	
19 May	Smooth Jazz Cafe 13	Various artists	
26 May	Kodex 5 Elements	White House Records	
2 June	Ghost Stories	Coldplay	
9 June	Chi	Eldo	
16 June	Lungs	Florence and the Machine	
23 June	Lungs	Florence and the Machine	
30 June	Ultraviolence	Lana Del Rey	
7 July	Ultraviolence	Lana Del Rey	
14 July	Ten	Pearl Jam	
21 July	Ten	Pearl Jam	
28 July	The Very Best of Diana Krall	Diana Krall	
4 August	The Very Best of Diana Krall	Diana Krall	
11 August	Romanza	Andrea Bocelli	
18 August	Romanza	Andrea Bocelli	
25 August	FutureSex/LoveSounds	Justin Timberlake	
1 September	FutureSex/LoveSounds	Justin Timberlake	
8 September	Empik Jazz Club: Louis Armstrong	Louis Armstrong	
15 September	Empik Jazz Club: Louis Armstrong	Louis Armstrong	
22 September	Muzyka do biegania	Various artists	
29 September	Wszystko z dymem	Włodi	
6 October	Pan z Katowic	Miuosh	
13 October	Chris Botti in Boston	Chris Botti	
20 October	Marek Sierocki Przedstawia: I Love Film	Various artists	
27 October	Songs of Innocence	U2	
31 October	Jakby nie było jutra	Happysad	
7 November	Labirynt Babel	B.O.K	
14 November	Hiper/Chimera	Donatan and Cleo	
21 November	The Endless River	Pink Floyd	
28 November	Pop & Roll	Dawid Kwiatkowski	
5 December	Empik Jazz Club: Leszek Możdżer – The Very Best Of	Leszek Możdżer	
12 December	Symphonica	George Michael	
19 December	Christmas & The City (Platinum Edition)	Various artists	
26 December	65 lat polskiej piosenki! Część 2	Various artists	

== See also ==
- List of number-one singles of 2014 (Poland)
