= Erilaiset =

Single by Robin

from the album Boom Kah
- Released: 16 October 2013
- Length: 3:34
- Label: Universal Music Oy

Robin singles chronology
"Boom Kah" (2013)	"Erilaiset" (2013)	"Onnellinen" (2014)

"Erilaiset" is a song by Finnish singer Robin. Released on 16 October 2013, the song serves as the second single from Robin's third studio album Boom Kah. The song peaked at number one on the Finnish Singles Chart.

== Chart performance ==
Chart (2013)	Peak position
Finland (Suomen virallinen lista)	1
