= Boombox (Robin album) =

Remix album by Robin
- Released: 11 March 2014
- Label: Universal Music Oy

Robin chronology
Boom Kah (2013)	Boombox (2014)	16 (2014)

Singles from Boombox
- 1. "Tilttaamaan" Released: 25 April 2014

Boombox is a remix album by Finnish singer Robin, released on 11 March 2014. Like its parent album Boom Kah, Boombox also reached number one on the Finnish Albums Chart.

== Track listing ==
No.	Title	Length
1.	"3D-lasit (Kartoon Remix)"	3:41
2.	"Erilaiset (Darude 'Maxed' Remix)"	3:07
3.	"Tilttaamaan (Beats & Styles Remix)" (featuring Lord Est)	3:12
4.	"Boom Kah (JS16 Remix)" (featuring Mikael Gabriel & Uniikki)	2:48
5.	"Eeppinen (OP Beats Remix)" (featuring VilleGalle)	3:33
6.	"Neon (Lenno Remix)"	4:36
7.	"Kävele mun kaa (Brutus Remix)"	3:52
8.	"Onnellinen (DJ Slow Remix)"	3:14
9.	"Anonyymit ja nimimerkit (JS16 Remix)"	3:52
10.	"Pystyt mihin vaan (Sakke Aalto Remix)"	3:09
11.	"Eeppinen (Ercola Remix)" (featuring VilleGalle)	3:13
12.	"Jetlag"	3:41
13.	"Kun nuoruus päättyy (Acoustic version)"	2:51
14.	"Boom Kah (Acoustic version)"	3:40

== Charts ==
Chart (2014)	Peak position
Finnish Albums (Suomen virallinen lista)	1

== Release history ==
Region	Date	Format	Label
Finland	11 March 2014	CD, digital download	Universal Music

== See also ==
- List of number-one albums of 2014 (Finland)
