= Chillaa =

2012 album by Robin

Studio album by Robin
- Released: 5 October 2012
- Recorded: 2012
- Genre: Pop
- Label: Universal Music Finland

Robin chronology
Koodi (2012)	Chillaa (2012)	Boom Kah (2013)

Singles from Chillaa
- 1. "Puuttuva palanen" Released: 12 September 2012; 2. "Luupilla mun korvissa" Released: 9 November 2012

Chillaa is the second studio album by Finnish teen pop singer Robin. It was released through Universal Music Finland.

== Track listing ==
1. "Chillaillaan"
2. "Puuttuva palanen" (featuring Brädi)
3. "Luupilla mun korvissa"
4. "Biologiaa"
5. "Biisi ystäville"
6. "Kaunis luonnostaan"
7. "Paniikkiin"
8. "Häröilemään"
9. "Sisko"
10. "Haluun sun palaavan"

== Deluxe edition ==
Chillaa Deluxe Edition

Studio album by Robin
- Released: October 2012
- Recorded: 2012
- Genre: Pop
- Label: Universal Music Finland

Chillaa was also released as a deluxe edition containing the same tracks as the standard edition in addition to:

Bonus tracks:

- 11. "Puuttuva palanen" (acoustic)
- 12. "Luupilla mun korvissa" (acoustic)
- 13. "Puuttuva palanen" (Wildzide remix)
- 14. "Chillaillaan" (Sillyhatz remix)
- 15. "Loopilla mun korvissa" (DJ Dosse Epic Slowjam FM remix)

Special bonus:

- 16. "Kun nuoruus päättyy" (featuring The Rasmus)

== Charts ==
Chart (2012)	Peak position
Finnish Albums (Suomen virallinen lista)	1
