= Freeman (singer) =

Finnish singer

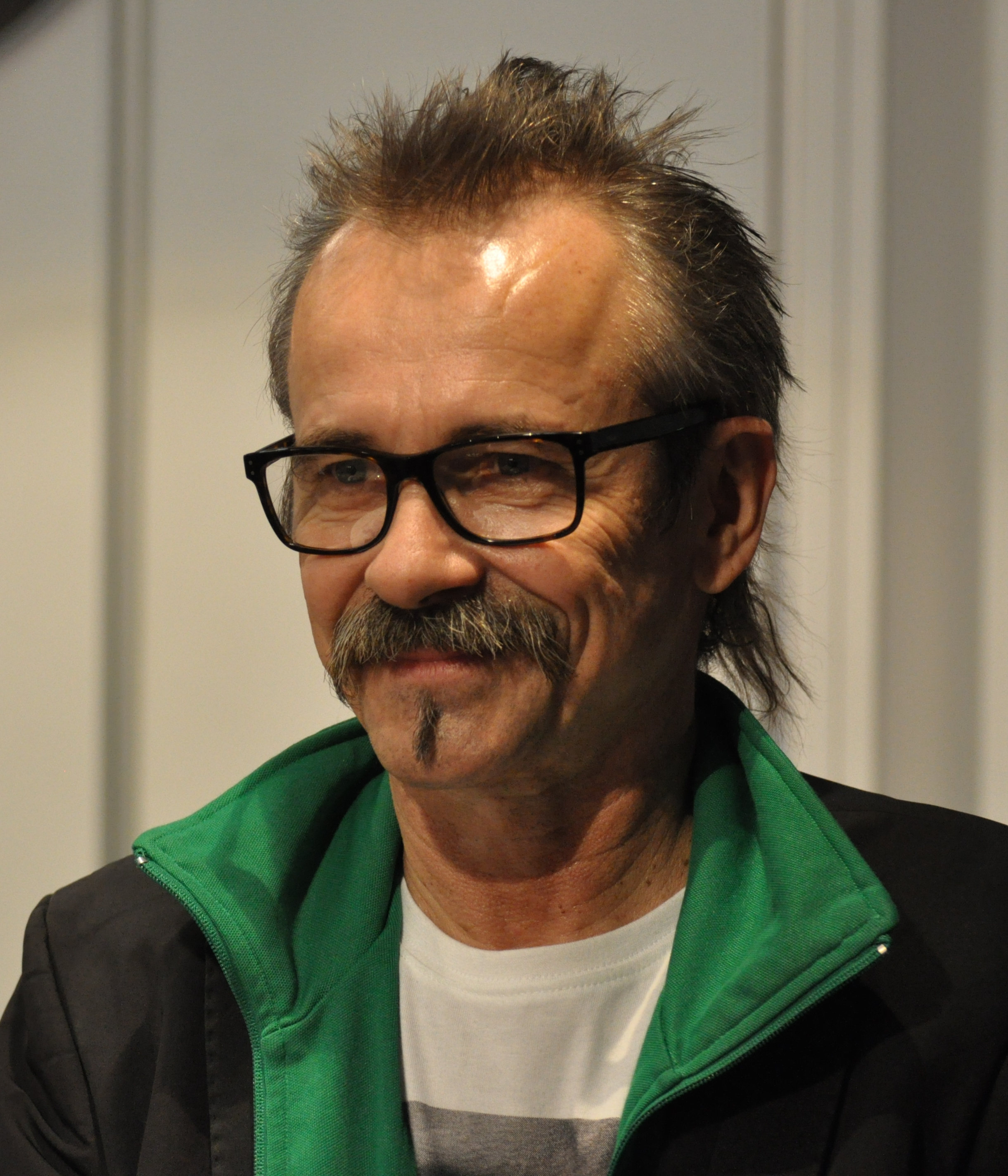
Freeman in 2011

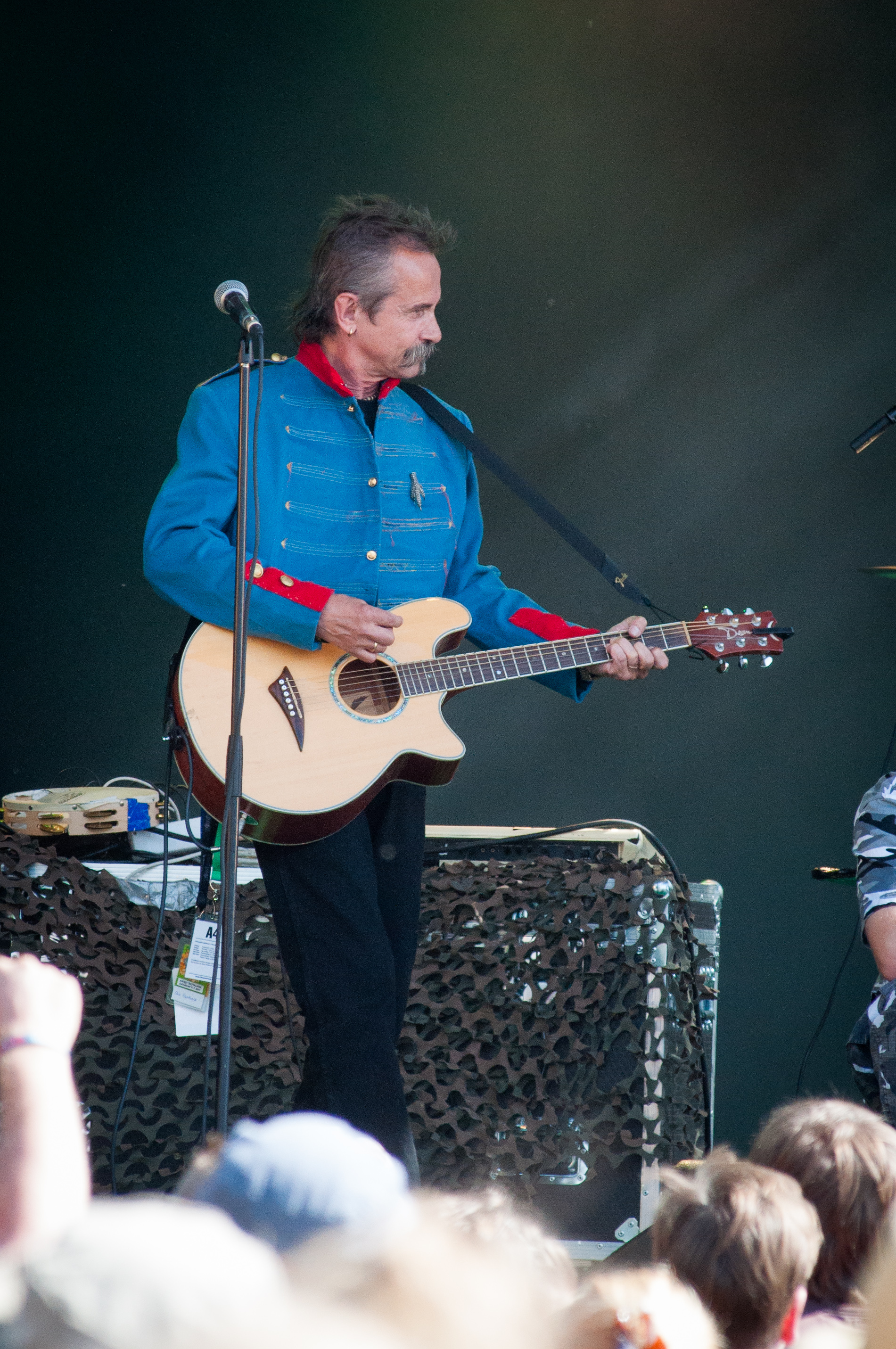
Freeman at Ilosaarirock in 2011

Leo Christer Friman (born 14 September 1951, in Lahti, Finland), better known by his stage name Freeman, is a Finnish singer, songwriter, and musician. He started his music career in a band called Waterloo. He was most popular in the 1970s, and his songs from that era, such as "Ajetaan tandemilla" and "Osuuskaupan Jane", remained popular into the 21st century. Freeman 4, his fourth studio album, was released nearly 25 years after the release of his last studio album, Tulta tai jäätä.

== Discography ==
=== Albums ===
- 1976: Freeman [Love Records]
- 1977: Freeman 2 [Love Records]
- 1986: Tulta tai jäätä [Megafon]
- 2011: Freeman 4 [Johanna] (reached #19 on Finnish Albums Chart)

=== Singles ===
Featured in

- 2010: "Liian myöhään" (Uusi Fantasia feat. Freeman) (reached #10 in Finnish Singles Chart)
- 2012: "Karjala Takaisin" (JVG feat. Freeman) (reached #5 in Finnish Singles Chart)
