= Frontside Ollie =

Single by Robin

from the album Koodi
- Released: 16 January 2012
- Recorded: 2012
- Genre: Pop rock, teen pop
- Length: 3:02
- Label: Universal Music Finland
- Songwriter: Sana Mustonen
- Producers: Maki Kolehmainen; Jimi Constantine; Tracy Lipp; Bernard Grobman; Sana Mustonen

Robin singles chronology
"Frontside Ollie" (2012)	"Faija Skitsoo" (2012)

Music video
- "Frontside Ollie" on YouTube

"Frontside Ollie" is a Finnish language song by Finnish teen pop artist Robin (full name Robin Packalen) and his debut single taken from his debut album Koodi. Written by Sana Mustonen, it was released on Universal Music on 16 January 2012.

The music video for the song went viral garnering more than 10 million views by the end of the second week of its upload on Universal Music Finland's YouTube account.

The song takes its name from the skateboard trick known as ollie.

== Chart performance ==
"Frontside Ollie" enjoyed instant success, huge following online and based on digital downloads debuted at number five on the Finnish Singles Chart. The single topped the Finnish Singles Chart in its second and third week of release staying at the top for 2 consecutive weeks (week 4 dated 25 January 2012 and week 5 dated 1 February 2012 before dropping from the top spot to #3 on week 6/2012 and back to #2 on week 7/2012.

On the occasion of the Robin album Koodi being released, the song jumped back again to the top of the chart (week 8 dated 22 February 2012) for a third week at #1 and stayed on top for a fourth week (week 9 dated 29 February 2012) before slipping back.

Chart (2012)	Peak position
Finland (Suomen virallinen lista)	1
