= Koodi =

Studio album by Robin
- Released: February 22, 2012
- Recorded: 2011
- Label: Universal Music Finland

Robin chronology
Koodi (2012)	Chillaa (2012)

Koodi (English: Code) is the debut album by Finnish teen pop singer Robin, released on 22 February 2012 through Universal Music Finland.

== Track list ==
1. "Frontside Ollie"
2. "Räjäytät mun pään"
3. "Hiljainen tyttö"
4. "Faija skitsoo"
5. "Otan aurinkoo"
6. "Ei tarvii esittää"
7. "Huutaa"
8. "Huominen saa odottaa"
9. "Saappaat"
10. "Ihan helmi"

== See also ==
- List of best-selling albums in Finland
