= Boom Kah =

Studio album by Robin
- Released: 4 October 2013
- Label: Universal Music Oy
- Producer: Jukka Immonen, Joonas Angeria, MGI, Jonas Olsson, Street Kobra, Kyösti Salokorpi

Robin chronology
Chillaa (2012)	Boom Kah (2013)	Boombox (2014)

Singles from Boom Kah
- 1. "Boom Kah" Released: 30 August 2013; 2. "Erilaiset" Released: 16 October 2013; 3. "Onnellinen" Released: 5 February 2014

Boom Kah is the third studio album by Finnish singer Robin, released on 4 October 2013. The title track was released as the first single on 30 August 2013. The album peaked at number one on the Finnish Albums Chart. Boom Kah has sold over 83,000 copies since its release, earning a triple platinum certification.

== Track listing ==
No.	Title	Length
1.	"Boom Kah" (featuring Mikael Gabriel & Uniikki)	3:14
2.	"Erilaiset"	3:34
3.	"Kävele mun kaa"	3:43
4.	"Tilttaamaan"	2:48
5.	"3D-lasit"	3:00
6.	"Anonyymit ja nimimerkit"	3:11
7.	"Onnellinen"	3:47
8.	"Neon"	3:30
9.	"Pystyt mihin vaan"	3:06
10.	"Eeppinen" (featuring VilleGalle)	3:13

== Charts and certifications ==
=== Charts ===
Chart (2013)	Peak position
Finnish Albums (Suomen virallinen lista)	1

=== Certifications ===
Region	Certification	Certified units/sales
Finland (Musiikkituottajat)	3× Platinum	93 291

== Release history ==
Region	Date	Format	Label
Finland	4 October 2013	CD, digital download	Universal Music

== See also ==
- List of number-one albums of 2013 (Finland)
