= Kasmir (singer) =

Finnish singer

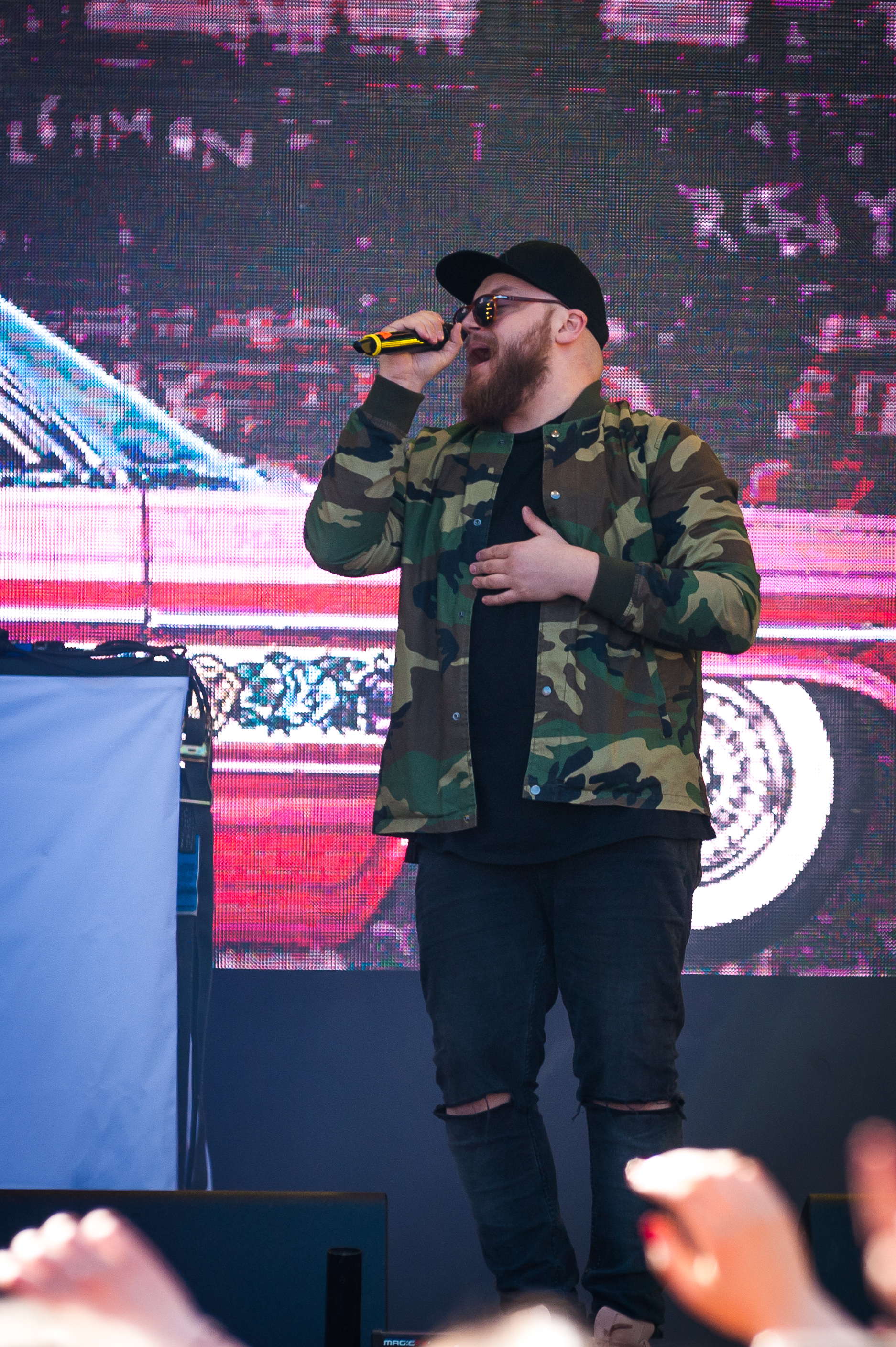
- Kasmir in 2017

Background information
- Born: Thomas Kirjonen; 27 March 1985 (age 41); Espoo, Finland
- Genres: Pop, soul
- Occupations: Singer, songwriter, musician
- Years active: 2000–present
- Label: Universal Music (2014–present)

Thomas Kirjonen (born 27 March 1985), better known as Kasmir, is a Finnish singer, musician and record producer. Kasmir's debut single "Vadelmavene" was released in April 2014 and peaked at number one on the Finnish Singles Chart. His debut solo album AMK Dropout was produced by Hank Solo and Jonas W. Karlsson and was released 19 September 2014. The album was the first in Finland to certify gold based on downloads and streams.

Prior to launching his solo career, he was a member and lead singer of the Finnish rock band Collarbone. The band that also included Janne Suominen (guitar), Mikko Merilinna (guitar), Matti Piipponen (bass) and Janne Sivunen (drums) was formed in 2000 and released two studio albums, The Back of Beyond in 2007 and Pretty Dirty in 2010.

Kirjonen is signed as a writer to Elements Music. He participated in the sixth season of the music reality television series Vain elämää.

== Discography ==
=== Albums ===
Year	Album	Peak positions
Year	Album	FIN
2014	Amk Dropout	5
2018	Valmis	1
2019	Jälki	7

=== Singles ===
Year	Single	Peak positions	Album
Year	Single	FIN	Album
2014	"Vadelmavene"	1	Amk Dropout
2014	"Wowwowwow"	4	Amk Dropout
2014	"Iholla"	19	Amk Dropout
2015	"Vauvoja" (featuring Saara)	2	TBA
2015	"Linnuton puu" (featuring Anna Puu)	—	SuomiLOVE-kokoelma
2016	"Amen"	7	TBA
2016	"Moshaamaan"	—	TBA
2016	"Nutellaa ja jutellaa"	—	TBA
2017	"Huonoo seuraa"	—	TBA
2017	"Kaija"	—	TBA
2018	"Tulia ja mennä"	15	TBA
2018	"Valoo"	13	TBA

=== Featured in ===
- 2013: "Spaceman" (Aste featuring Kasmir)
- 2013: "Kiinni" (Sanni featuring Kasmir)
- 2013: "On the Edge" (HeavyWeight featuring Kasmir)
- 2014: "Box of Lego" (tyDi featuring Kasmir & Sinead Burgess)
- 2015: "Milloin nään sut uudestaan?" (Robin featuring Kasmir)
