= Robin Packalen =

Finnish singer

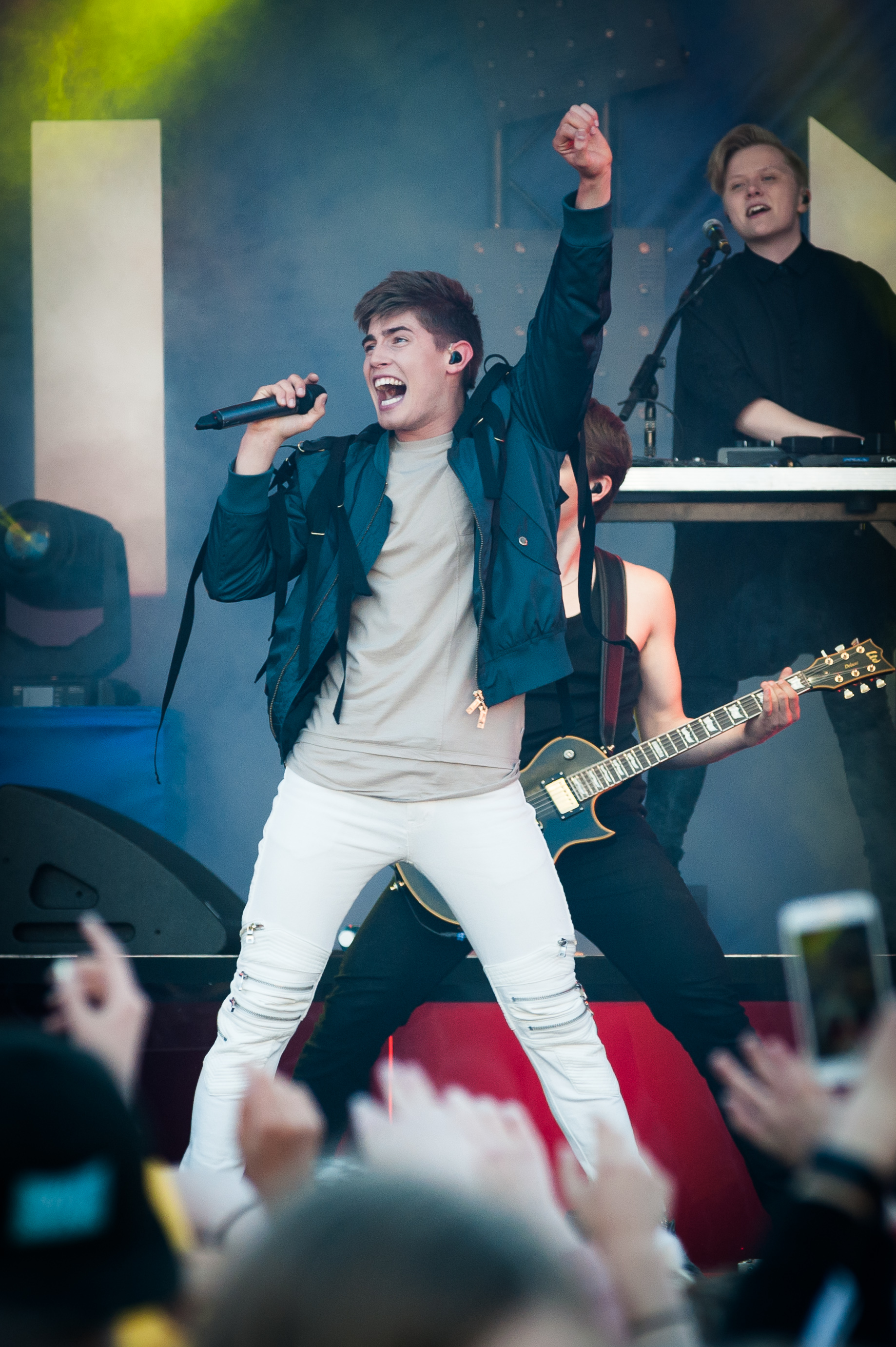
- Packalen in 2017

Background information
- Also known as: Robin
- Born: 24 August 1998 (age 27); Turku, Finland
- Genres: Pop
- Occupation: Singer
- Years active: 2008–2017, 2019–present
- Label: Universal Music Finland
- Website: www.robinpackalen.com

Robin Packalen (born 24 August 1998), previously known by his mononym Robin, is a Finnish singer who started as a teen pop artist. During his career, Packalen's certified albums and singles sales have amounted to over 370,000 copies, making him one of the 70 best-selling artists of all-time in Finland.

== Music career ==
=== 2008–2009: Staraskaba and New Wave Junior Contest ===
In 2008, Packalen won the Finnish nationwide singing contest for youth, Staraskaba, when he was just 10. In 2009, he represented Finland at the New Wave Junior Contest in Moscow, which was followed by about 100 million viewers.

=== 2012–2013: Koodi and Chillaa ===
On 16 January 2012, Packalen, described as the "Justin Bieber of Finland" by his label, released his debut single "Frontside Ollie". It received instant success, huge following online, and based on digital downloads debuted at number five on the Finnish Singles Chart before reaching the top position. On 22 February 2012, his first album Koodi was released. It sold over 100,000 records in Finland, earning quintuple platinum.

On 5 October 2012, Packalen released his second studio album Chillaa. The album topped the Finnish Albums Chart in its first week of release.

=== 2013–2014: Boom Kah ===
On 30 August 2013, Packalen released "Boom Kah", featuring Mikael Gabriel and Uniikki, as the lead single from his third studio album Boom Kah. The song peaked at number four on the Finnish Singles Chart. On 2 October 2013, he released the album Boom Kah, which also topped the Finnish Albums Chart. The chart topping second single, "Erilaiset", was released on 16 October 2013.

Packalen released his fourth studio album 16 on 22 September 2014.

=== 2015–2018: Yhdessä, acting, and military hiatus ===
An all-duet album, Yhdessä, was released on 9 October 2015. In 2017, he had a small role as a soldier in the Finnish war film The Unknown Soldier. Packalen later went on a hiatus in 2018 to serve in the military, which is mandatory for every Finnish male citizen.

=== 2019–present: Comeback ===
On 2 February 2019, during the Emma Gaala awards ceremony, Packalen announced his comeback with a live performance of "I'll Be with You".

On 11 January 2023, it was announced that Packalen would participate in Uuden Musiikin Kilpailu 2023 with the song "Girls Like You". In the final, he finished in fourth place with 109 points (81 points from the televote and 28 points from the juries).

== Discography ==
- Koodi (2012)
- Chillaa (2012)
- Boom Kah (2013)
- Boombox (2014)
- 16 (2014)
- Yhdessä (2015)
- Punasel (2024)

== See also ==
- List of best-selling music artists in Finland
