= The Voice of Finland season 7 =

The Voice of Finland
- Season 7
- Hosted by: Heikki Paasonen (host); Elina Kottonen (social media)
- Judges: Anna Puu; Olli Lindholm; Redrama; Toni Wirtanen
- Winner: Jerkka Virtanen
- Winning coach: Redrama
- Runner-up: Mia Suszko
- Finals venue: Logomo

Release
- Original network: Nelonen
- Original release: January 5 – April 20, 2018

Season chronology
- ← Previous; Season 6

The Voice of Finland (season 7) is the seventh season of the Finnish reality singing competition based on The Voice format. The season premiered on Nelonen on January 5, 2018. The live final was on April 20, 2018. The contest was won by Jerkka Virtanen.
