= The Voice of Finland season 6 =

The Voice of Finland
- Season 6
- Hosted by: Heikki Paasonen (host); Tinni Wikström (social media)
- Judges: Anna Puu; Olli Lindholm; Redrama; Michael Monroe
- Winner: Saija Saarnisto
- Winning coach: Redrama
- Runner-up: Aksel Kankaanranta
- Finals venue: Logomo

Release
- Original network: Nelonen
- Original release: January 6 – April 14, 2017

Season chronology
- ← Previous; Season 5 Next → Season 7

The Voice of Finland (season 6) is the sixth season of the Finnish reality singing competition based on The Voice format. The season premiered on Nelonen on January 6, 2017. The live final is scheduled on April 14, 2017.

The coaches are singers Anna Puu, Olli Lindholm, Redrama and Michael Monroe. Heikki Paasonen hosts the program.

== Teams ==
Color Key

- Winner
- Runner-up
- Third place
- Fourth place
- Eliminated in the Semi-final
- Eliminated in the Live round
- Eliminated in the Knockout rounds
- Artist was stolen by another coach in the Battle rounds
- Eliminated in the Battle rounds
- Withdrew

Coaches	Top 51 artists			
Olli Lindholm				
Olli Lindholm	Tiina Nyyssönen	AJ Keskinen	Emmi Bogdanoff	Seungjae Kim
Olli Lindholm	Annika Syrjälä	Tenho Olavi	Mariella Pudas	Sini Ikävalko
Olli Lindholm	Terhi Tammelin	~~Piia Hiukka & Anu Hänninen~~	~~Saara Lehtonen~~	Petri Tavinen
Olli Lindholm	Tommi Fäldt	Emmi Harju	Ramona Vaara	Marja Pisilä
Redrama				
Redrama	Saija Saarnisto	Juuso Vuorinen	Mariia Kharlamova	Saija Saarinen
Redrama	Janne Vaittinen	Michael Ekeghasi	Linda Tarvainen	Fatu Niang
Redrama	~~Jessica Timgren-Forss~~	~~Viola Pöyhönen~~	Gavin Kshetri	Katja Rajaniemi
Redrama	Erica Hokkanen	Vanessa Kautto	Terry Kim	
Anna Puu				
Anna Puu	Aksel Kankaanranta	Anna Ijäs	Jessica Timgren-Forss	Viola Pöyhönen
Anna Puu	Outi-Maija Itkonen	Emma Vaattovaara	Iara Dias dos Santos	Elli Hleihel
Anna Puu	~~Tiina Nyyssönen~~	~~Yohan Henriksson~~	~~Mariia Kharlamova~~	~~Annika Syrjälä~~
Anna Puu	Tiia Välikangas	Elli Lukander		
Michael Monroe				
Michael Monroe	Andrea Brosio	Sara Kurkola	Victoria Shuudifonya	Plamen de la Bona
Michael Monroe	Yohan Henriksson	Saara Lehtonen	Anne Tanskanen	Niko Rimbacher
Michael Monroe	Piia Hiukka & Anu Hänninen	~~Seungjae Kim~~	~~Saija Saarinen~~	Säde Hovisilta
Michael Monroe	Riku Soininen	Piia Kolima	Kata Valli	Jani Korpela
Note: Italicized names are stolen contestants (names struck through within former teams).

== Episodes ==
=== The Blind Auditions ===
Key	Coach hit his or her "I WANT YOU" button	Contestant eliminated with no coach pressing his or her "I WANT YOU" button	Contestant defaulted to this coach's team	Contestant elected to join this coach's team

==== Episode 1: January 6, 2017 ====
Order	Contestant	Song	Coaches' and Contestants' Choices			
Order	Contestant	Song	Olli Lindholm	Redrama	Anna Puu	Michael Monroe
1	Juuso Vuorinen	"Kings and Queens"				
2	Sini Ikävalko	"Mad About the Boy"		—	—	—
3	Tiina Nyyssönen	"Vihaan kyllästynyt"				
4	Karkki Puustinen	"Sama nainen"	—	—	—	—
5	Mariia Kharlamova	"Daddy Lessons"		—		—
6	A-J Keskinen	"Annan sinulle nimen"		—	—	—
7	Milka Uusitalo	"Highway Star"	—	—	—	—
8	Kata Valli	"The Story"		—	—	
9	Arttu Aaltonen	"Kulkuri ja Joutsen"	—	—	—	—
10	Gavin Kshetri	"The Man Who Can't Be Moved"			—	—

==== Episode 2: January 12, 2017 ====
Order	Contestant	Song	Coaches' and Contestants' Choices			
Order	Contestant	Song	Olli Lindholm	Redrama	Anna Puu	Michael Monroe
1	Aksel Kankaanranta	"Riptide"	—			—
2	Viola Pöyhönen	"Oon voimissain"				—
3	Plamen de la Bona	"Summer of '69"				
4	Ebunoluwa Kivinen	"Natural Woman"	—	—	—	—
5	Mariella Pudas	"Faithfully"		—	—	—
6	Anna Ijäs	"Sun oon"				

==== Episode 3: January 13, 2017 ====
Order	Contestant	Song	Coaches' and Contestants' Choices			
Order	Contestant	Song	Olli Lindholm	Redrama	Anna Puu	Michael Monroe
1	Piia Kolima	"Highway to Hell"				
2	Aino Jouha	"I See Fire"	—	—	—	—
3	Tenho Olavi	"Resistance"		—	—	—
4	Annika Syrjälä	"Häävalssi"				—
5	Dimitri Grönfors	"Aivan sama mulle mä oon onnellinen"	—	—	—	—
6	Saija Saarnisto	"Autumn Leaves"				

==== Episode 4: January 19, 2017 ====
Order	Contestant	Song	Coaches' and Contestants' Choices			
Order	Contestant	Song	Olli Lindholm	Redrama	Anna Puu	Michael Monroe
1	Saija Saarinen	"Separate Ways (Worlds Apart)"				
2	Aaron Knox	"Lego House"	—	—	—	—
3	Mari Jokinen	"Voi kuinka me sinua kaivataan"	—	—	—	—
4	Edvard Seger	"The First Cut Is the Deepest"	—	—	—	—
5	Elli Lukander	"Minä ja hän"				
6	Kaj Kiviniemi	"Everybody's Changing"	—	—	—	—

==== Episode 5: January 20, 2017 ====
Order	Contestant	Song	Coaches' and Contestants' Choices			
Order	Contestant	Song	Olli Lindholm	Redrama	Anna Puu	Michael Monroe
1	Tiia Välikangas	"Leijonakuningas"	—	—		—
2	Linda Tarvainen	"Black Magic"				
3	Laura Toivanen	"Toiset meistä"	—	—	—	—
4	Terry Kim	"So Sick"				
5	Säde Hovisilta	"Paris (Ooh La La)"		—	—	
6	Niko Rimbacher	"I Believe in a Thing Called Love"				

==== Episode 6: January 26, 2017 ====
Order	Contestant	Song	Coaches' and Contestants' Choices			
Order	Contestant	Song	Olli Lindholm	Redrama	Anna Puu	Michael Monroe
1	Emmi Harju	"Hit the Road Jack"		—	—	—
2	Emmi Bogdanoff	"Kaikista kasvoista"		—	—	—
3	Terhi Tammelin	"Pulp Fiction"		—	—	—
4	Riku Soininen	"King of the Road"	—	—	—	
5	Fanni-Olivia Peltoniemi	"Mansikkamäki"	—	—	—	—
6	Michael Ekeghasi	"One Love/People Get Ready"	—			

==== Episode 7: January 27, 2017 ====
Order	Contestant	Song	Coaches' and Contestants' Choices			
Order	Contestant	Song	Olli Lindholm	Redrama	Anna Puu	Michael Monroe
1	Tatu Koivukoski	"Sinun vuorosi loistaa"	—	—	—	—
2	Ramona Vaara	"Via Dolorosa"		—	—	
3	Petri Tavinen	"Kolmatta linjaa takaisin"				
4	Tarja Sundell	"Because the Night"	—	—	—	—
5	Emma Vaattovaara	"Täysikuu"				—
6	Vanessa Kautto	"Titanium"				

==== Episode 8: February 2, 2017 ====
Order	Contestant	Song	Coaches' and Contestants' Choices			
Order	Contestant	Song	Olli Lindholm	Redrama	Anna Puu	Michael Monroe
1	Heljä Hirvonen	"Jos mun pokka pitää"	—	—	—	—
2	Janne Vaittinen	"The A Team"	—			—
1	Miina Enjala	"Hyökyaalto"	—	—	—	—
4	Petter Andersson	"Never Gonna Give You Up"	—	—	—	—
5	Outi-Maija Itkonen	"The Lion's Roar"				—
6	Andrea Brosio	"The Kill"				

==== Episode 9: February 3, 2017 ====
Order	Contestant	Song	Coaches' and Contestants' Choices			
Order	Contestant	Song	Olli Lindholm	Redrama	Anna Puu	Michael Monroe
1	Piia Hiukka/Anu Hänninen	"River Deep Mountain High"		—	—	—
2	Mirella Ojala	"Kultaiset korvarenkaat"	—	—	—	—
3	Juha Karvonen	"Nights In White Satin"	—	—	—	—
4	Victoria Shuudifonya	"Let It Go"		—	—	
5	Susan Karttunen	"Naispaholainen"	—	—	—	—
6	Erica Hokkanen	"Fever"				

==== Episode 10: February 9, 2017 ====
Order	Contestant	Song	Coaches' and Contestants' Choices			
Order	Contestant	Song	Olli Lindholm	Redrama	Anna Puu	Michael Monroe
1	Nigel Moore	"Talking to the Moon"	—	—	—	—
2	Veera Elina	"Eden"	—	—	—	—
3	Anne Tanskanen	"Je t'aime"		—	—	
4	Saara Lehtonen	"Jää"		—	—	—
5	Kalle Rönkkö	"Moondance"	—			—
6	Jessica Timgren-Forss	"Try"			—	—

==== Episode 11: February 10, 2017 ====
Order	Contestant	Song	Coaches' and Contestants' Choices			
Order	Contestant	Song	Olli Lindholm	Redrama	Anna Puu	Michael Monroe
1	Jani Korpela	"Psychosocial"	—	—	—	
2	Marja Pisilä	"Balladi elokuvasta Klaani"		—	—	—
3	Iara Dias dos Santos	"Put Your Records On"		—		—
4	Katja Rajaniemi	"(You Make Me Feel Like) A Natural Woman"				
5	Niklas Saarela	"Myrskyn jälkeen"	—	—	—	—
6	Yohan Henriksson	"Walking in the Air"	—	—		

==== Episode 12: February 16, 2017 ====
Order	Contestant	Song	Coaches' and Contestants' Choices			
Order	Contestant	Song	Olli Lindholm	Redrama	Anna Puu	Michael Monroe
1	Elli Hleihel	"Take Me to Church"				—
2	Teemu Kantanen	"We Don't Have to Take Our Clothes Off"	—	—	—	—
3	Fatu Niang	"We Don't Have to Take Our Clothes Off"			—	—
4	Demian Seesjärvi	"Awake"	—	—	—	—
5	Janna Koskipää	"Wings"	—	—	—	—
6	Sara Kurkola	"Nocturne"		—	—	
7	Tommi Fäldt	"Pelastaja"		—	—	—
8	Seungjae Kim	"Open Arms"	—	—	—	

=== Battle rounds ===
During battle rounds, coaches divide contestants to pairs and give them a song to perform. Coach then choose a winner to continue to the Knock Out phase. The losing contestant can still be stolen by another coach, as each coach can make two steals. Each coach is also joined by an adviser, with Michael Monroe being joined by singer Robin, Olli Lindholm by singer Ellinoora, Anna Puu by singer Pete Parkkonen, and Redrama by singer Diandra.

Colour key

✔	Coach hit his/her "I WANT YOU" button
	Artist won the Battle and advanced to the Knockouts
	Artist lost the Battle but was stolen by another coach and advances to the Knockouts
	Artist lost the Battle and was eliminated

==== Episode 13: February 17, 2017 ====
Order	Coach	Artists		Song	Coaches' and artists' choices			
Order	Coach	Artists		Song	Olli Lindholm	Redrama	Anna Puu	Michael Monroe
1	Redrama	Michael Ekeghasi	Terry Kim	"Can't Stop the Feeling"	—	—	—	—
2	Anna Puu	Tiina Nyyssönen	Anna Ijäs	"Sua varten"	✔	✔	—	—
3	Michael Monroe	Jani Korpela	Andrea Brosio	"Surrender"	—	—	—	—
4	Anna Puu	Yohan Henriksson	Outi-Maija Itkonen	"Some Die Young"	—	✔	—	✔
5	Olli Lindholm	Marja Pisilä	Emmi Bogdanoff	"Supernaisia"	N/A	—	—	—
5	Olli Lindholm	Ramona Vaara	Emmi Bogdanoff	"Supernaisia"	N/A	—	—	—
6	Michael Monroe	Sara Kurkola	Saija Saarinen	"Minä sinua vaan"	✔	✔	✔	—

==== Episode 14: February 23, 2017 ====
Order	Coach	Artists		Song	Coaches' and artists' choices			
Order	Coach	Artists		Song	Olli Lindholm	Redrama	Anna Puu	Michael Monroe
1	Olli Lindholm	Terhi Tammelin	Emmi Harju	"Carrie"	—	—	—	—
2	Redrama	Jessica Timgren-Forss	Juuso Vuorinen	"I Won't Back Down"	—	—	✔	—
3	Anna Puu	Elli Hleihel	Elli Lukander	"Tuu Mua Vastaan"	—	—	—	—
4	Michael Monroe	Kata Valli	Plamen de la Bona	"All For Love"	✔	—	—	N/A
4	Michael Monroe	Kata Valli	Seungjay Kim	"All For Love"	✔	—	—	N/A
5	Olli Lindholm	Tenho Olavi	Tommi Fäldt	"You Know My Name"	—	—	—	—
6	Redrama	Viola Pöyhönen	Saija Saarnisto	"Smells Like Teen Spirit"	—	—	✔	—

==== Episode 15: February 24, 2017 ====
Order	Coach	Artists		Song	Coaches' and artists' choices			
Order	Coach	Artists		Song	Olli Lindholm	Redrama	Anna Puu	Michael Monroe
1	Anna Puu	Tiia Välikangas	Aksel Kankaanranta	"Blank Space"	—	—	—	—
2	Michael Monroe	Niko Rimbacher	Piia Kolima	"Pet Sematary"	—	—	—	—
3	Redrama	Linda Tarvainen	Vanessa Kautto	"Everytime"	—	N/A	—	—
3	Redrama	Linda Tarvainen	Erica Hokkanen	"Everytime"	—	N/A	—	—
4	Michael Monroe	Riku Soininen	Anne Tanskanen	"Tuhat yötä"	—	—	—	—
5	Anna Puu	Iara Dias Dos Santos	Mariia Kharlamova	"Love Me like You Do"	—	✔	—	—
6	Olli Lindholm	Mariella Pudas	Piia Hiukka / Anu Hänninen	"One Moment in Time"	—	—	—	✔

==== Episode 16: March 2, 2017 ====
Order	Coach	Artists		Song	Coaches' and artists' choices			
Order	Coach	Artists		Song	Olli Lindholm	Redrama	Anna Puu	Michael Monroe
1	Michael Monroe	Säde Hovisilta	Victoria Shuudifonya	"Don't Speak"	—	—	—	—
2	Redrama	Fatu Niang	Katja Rajaniemi	"First Time"	—	—	—	—
3	Olli Lindholm	AJ Keskinen	Petri Tavinen	"Kukaan ei koskaan"	—	—	—	—
4	Redrama	Janne Vaittinen	Gavin Kshetri	"Love Yourself"	—	—	—	—
5	Olli Lindholm	Saara Lehtonen	Sini Ikävalko	"Elämäni miehet"	—	—	—	✔
6	Anna Puu	Annika Syrjälä	Kalle Rönkkö	"Kultaa hiuksissa"	✔	—	N/A	—
6	Anna Puu	Annika Syrjälä	Emma Vaattovaara	"Kultaa hiuksissa"	✔	—	N/A	—

=== Knockout rounds ===
The Knockout rounds were aired on 3, 9, 10, and 17 of March, 2017. Teams of 8 (Anna Puu and Redrama) and 9 (Michael Monroe and Olli Lindholm) were stripped down to 4 for the live shows. The knockout takes place in a form of four-chair challenge where after each performance the coach decides on giving a chair numbered from 1 (the best performance of the night) to 4 (the last place to qualify to the live finals) or eliminates the contestant immediately. When the chairs are full and the coach decides to give a numbered chair to another contestant, the contestant on the 4th chair is eliminated and other contestants change seats to adjust to the latest number.

Colour key

Artist was given a numbered chair and advanced to the live finals
Artist was eliminated

==== Episode 17: March 3, 2017 ====
Order	Coach	Artist	Song	Result
1	Olli Lindholm	Annika Syrjälä	"Sinun vuorosi loistaa"	Eliminated
2	Olli Lindholm	Tenho Olavi	"Maailman toisella puolen"	Eliminated
3	Olli Lindholm	Mariella Pudas	"Kuurupiiloa"	Eliminated
4	Olli Lindholm	AJ Keskinen	"Aurora"	2nd
5	Olli Lindholm	Tiina Nyyssönen	"Malja"	1st
6	Olli Lindholm	Seungjay Kim	"Counting Stars"	3rd
7	Olli Lindholm	Sini Ikävalko	"Miks ei"	Eliminated
8	Olli Lindholm	Terhi Tammelin	"2080-luvulla"	Eliminated
9	Olli Lindholm	Emmi Bogdanoff	"Päästä mut pois"	4th

==== Episode 18: March 9, 2017 ====
Order	Coach	Artist	Song	Result
1	Anna Puu	Anna Ijäs	"Ei pystynyt hengittää"	4th
2	Anna Puu	Outi-Maija Itkonen	"Little Lion Man"	Eliminated
3	Anna Puu	Emma Vaattovaara	"Poika nimeltä Päivi"	Eliminated
4	Anna Puu	Viola Pöyhönen	"The Greatest"	3rd
5	Anna Puu	Iara Dias dos Santos	"Sweet Child O' Mine"	Eliminated
6	Anna Puu	Aksel Kankaanranta	"When I Was Your Man"	1st
7	Anna Puu	Elli Hleihel	"Lemmikki"	Eliminated
8	Anna Puu	Jessica Timgren-Forss	"Say You Won't Let Go"	2nd

==== Episode 19: March 10, 2017 ====
Order	Coach	Artist	Song	Result
1	Redrama	Saija Saarinen	"En pelkää pimeää"	3rd
2	Redrama	Janne Vaittinen	"You Don't Know Love"	Eliminated
3	Redrama	Michael Ekeghasi	"Joka päivä ja jokaikinen yö"	Eliminated
4	Redrama	Linda Tarvainen	"Wildest Dreams"	Eliminated
5	Redrama	Mariia Kharlamova	"Human"	4th
6	Redrama	Juuso Vuorinen	"Best of You"	2nd
7	Redrama	Fatu Niang	"Honey"	Eliminated
8	Redrama	Saija Saarnisto	"Hallelujah"	1st

==== Episode 20: March 17, 2017 ====
Order	Coach	Artist	Song	Result
1	Michael Monroe	Yohan Henriksson	"Basket Case"	Eliminated
2	Michael Monroe	Saara Lehtonen	"Pienen keijun laulu"	Eliminated
3	Michael Monroe	Anne Tanskanen	"What I Did for Love"	Eliminated
4	Michael Monroe	Niko Rimbacher	"Dream On"	Eliminated
5	Michael Monroe	Victoria Shuudifonya	"Läpinäkyvää"	3rd
6	Michael Monroe	Sara Kurkola	"Bird Set Free"	2nd
7	Michael Monroe	Andrea Brosio	"Always"	1st
8	Michael Monroe	Piia Hiukka & Anu Hänninen	"It's Raining Men"	Eliminated
9	Michael Monroe	Plamen de la Bona	"Living in America"	4th

=== Live shows ===
Live shows began on March 25. The live shows were aired on Friday at 8 PM from Logomo, Turku.

Colour key

Artist was saved by the Public's vote
Artist was saved by his/her coach
Artist was eliminated

==== Live 1 March 24, 2017 ====
The first live show featured a group performance by the coaches, singing each other's popular songs: "Kickstart" (Redrama), "Minne tuulet vie" (Olli Lindholm), "Säännöt rakkaudelle" (Anna Puu), "Don't You Ever Leave Me" (Hanoi Rocks/Michael Monroe).

Order	Coach	Artist	Song	Result
1	Olli Lindholm	Emmi Bogdanoff	"Rakas"	Eliminated
2	Olli Lindholm	AJ Koskinen	"Sinä olet minun"	Public's vote
3	Olli Lindholm	Seungjae Kim	"Love Me Now"	Eliminated
4	Olli Lindholm	Tiina Nyyssönen	"Intiaanit"	Olli's vote
5	Anna Puu	Jessica Timgren-Forss	"Runnin' (Lose It All)"	Eliminated
6	Anna Puu	Aksel Kankaanranta	"Sinuun minä jään"	Public's vote
7	Anna Puu	Viola Pöyhönen	"Scars to Your Beautiful"	Public's vote
8	Anna Puu	Anna Ijäs	"Hakuammuntaa"	Anna's vote

==== Live 2 March 31, 2017 ====
The show featured guest performances from Haloo Helsinki ("Oh no Let's Go") and The Rasmus ("Paradise").

Order	Coach	Artist	Song	Result
1	Michael Monroe	Plamen de la Bona	"Bamboléo"	Eliminated
2	Michael Monroe	Victoria Shuudifonya	"Get Away"	Eliminated
3	Michael Monroe	Sara Kurkola	"Sinua sinua rakastan"	Monroe's vote
4	Michael Monroe	Andrea Brosio	"Follow Me"	Public's vote
5	Redrama	Saija Saarinen	"Ota minut tällaisena kuin oon"	Eliminated
6	Redrama	Juuso Vuorinen	"Welcome to the Black Parade"	Redrama's vote
7	Redrama	Mariia Kharlamova	"Changing"	Eliminated
8	Redrama	Saija Saarnisto	"Olet mun kaikuluotain"	Public's vote

==== Semifinal (April 7) ====
The show was opened by Jenni Vartiainen with her single, "Turvasana". Also Michael Monroe Band performed, with their new single ("One Foot Outta the Grave").

Competition performances

Order	Coach	Artist	Song	Result
1	Michael Monroe	Andrea Brosio	"Janie's Got a Gun"	Advanced
2	Michael Monroe	Sara Kurkola	"Creep"	Eliminated
3	Olli Lindholm	AJ Keskinen	"Nummela"	Eliminated
4	Olli Lindholm	Tiina Nyyssönen	"Kaikki nuoret tyypit"	Advanced
5	Anna Puu	Aksel Kankaanranta	"Let Me Love You"	Advanced
6	Anna Puu	Anna Ijäs	"Antaudun"	Eliminated
7	Redrama	Saija Saarnisto	"Vielä täällä"	Advanced
8	Redrama	Juuso Vuorinen	"Me ei enää olla me"	Eliminated

Semifinal results

Team	Artist	Coach points	Advance points	Public points	Total points	Result
Michael Monroe	Andrea Brosio	60	47	57	164	Advanced to final
Michael Monroe	Sara Kurkola	40	53	43	136	Eliminated
Olli Lindholm	AJ Keskinen	40	50	59	149	Eliminated
Olli Lindholm	Tiina Nyyssönen	60	50	41	151	Advanced to final
Anna Puu	Aksel Kankaanranta	60	49	60	169	Advanced to final
Anna Puu	Anna Ijäs	40	51	40	131	Eliminated
Redrama	Saija Saarnisto	60	51	62	173	Advanced to final
Redrama	Juuso Vuorinen	40	49	38	127	Eliminated

==== Final (April 14) ====
The guest performers of the final live show were Antti Tuisku ("Rahan takii") and Happoradio ("Älä puhu huomisesta").

Competition performances

Each finalist performs a cover song and a duet with their team coach.

Performance Order	Coach	Contestant	Type	Song	Result
1	Anna Puu	Aksel Kankaanranta	Duet	"Hymn for the Weekend" (with Anna Puu)	Runner-up
2	Olli Lindholm	Tiina Nyyssönen	Duet	"Valot pimeyksien reunoilla" (with Olli Lindholm)	4th Place
3	Redrama	Saija Saarnisto	Duet	"Holy Grail" (with Redrama)	Winner
4	Michael Monroe	Andrea Brosio	Duet	"Dead, Jail or Rock 'n' Roll" (with Michael Monroe)	3rd Place
5	Olli Lindholm	Tiina Nyyssönen	Solo	"Polte"	4th Place
6	Redrama	Saija Saarnisto	Solo	"Mä annan sut pois"	Winner
7	Michael Monroe	Andrea Brosio	Solo	"I Will Stay"	3rd Place
8	Anna Puu	Aksel Kankaanranta	Solo	"Thinking Out Loud"	Runner-up

Final results

– Winner
– Runner-up
– 3rd/4th place

Artist	Team	% of votes	Result
Saija Saarnisto	Redrama	38,5	Winner
Aksel Kankaanranta	Anna Puu	33,9	Runner-up
Andrea Brosio	Michael Monroe	14,7	3rd place
Tiina Nyyssönen	Olli Lindholm	12,9	4th place

== Elimination Chart ==
=== Overall ===
Color key
Artist's info

- Team Michael
- Team Anna
- Team Olli
- Team Redrama

Result details

- Winner
- Runner-up
- Third place
- Fourth place
- Artist was saved by the public
- Artist was saved by his/her coach
- Artist advanced to the finals
- Artist was eliminated
- Artist did not perform on that particular week

Live show results per week
Artist	Week 1	Week 2	Week 3	Finals
Saija Saarnisto		Safe	Safe	Winner
Aksel Kankaanranta	Safe		Safe	Runner-up
Andrea Brosio		Safe	Safe	3rd place
Tiina Nyyssönen	Safe		Safe	4th place
AJ Keskinen	Safe		Eliminated	Eliminated (Week 3)
Sara Kurkola		Safe	Eliminated	Eliminated (Week 3)
Juuso Vuorinen		Safe	Eliminated	Eliminated (Week 3)
Anna Ijäs	Safe		Eliminated	Eliminated (Week 3)
Mariia Kharlamova		Eliminated	Eliminated (Week 2)	
Saija Saarinen		Eliminated	Eliminated (Week 2)	
Victoria Shuudifonya		Eliminated	Eliminated (Week 2)	
Plamen de la Bona		Eliminated	Eliminated (Week 2)	
Jessica Timgren-Forss	Eliminated	Eliminated (Week 1)		
Viola Pöyhönen	Eliminated	Eliminated (Week 1)		
Emmi Bogdanoff	Eliminated	Eliminated (Week 1)		
Seungjae Kim	Eliminated	Eliminated (Week 1)		

== Reception and TV ratings ==
The Voice of Finland airs twice a week, on Thursday and Friday evenings at 8:00 pm. Only the higher rating for the week is given.

#	Episode	Original air date	Time	Rating on same day	Rating within 7 days
1	"Season 6 Premiere"	January 6, 2017	Friday 8:00pm	760,000	809,000
2	"The Blind Auditions, Part 2"	January 12, 2017	Thursday 8:00pm	n/a	n/a
3	"The Blind Auditions, Part 3"	January 13, 2016	Friday 8:00pm	601,000	653,000
4	"The Blind Auditions, Part 4"	January 19, 2017	Thursday 8:00pm	n/a	n/a
5	"The Blind Auditions, Part 5"	January 20, 2017	Friday 8:00pm	653,000	683,000
6	"The Blind Auditions, Part 6"	January 26, 2017	Thursday 8:00pm	n/a	n/a
7	"The Blind Auditions, Part 7"	January 27, 2017	Friday 8:00pm	740,000	773,000
8	"The Blind Auditions, Part 8"	February 2, 2017	Thursday 8:00pm	n/a	n/a
9	"The Blind Auditions, Part 9"	February 3, 2017	Friday 8:00pm	813,000	836,000
10	"The Blind Auditions, Part 10"	February 9, 2017	Thursday 8:00pm	n/a	n/a
11	"The Blind Auditions, Part 11"	February 10, 2017	Friday 8:00pm	762,000	778,000
12	"The Blind Auditions, Part 12"	February 16, 2017	Thursday 8:00pm	n/a	n/a
13	"The Battles, Part 1"	February 17, 2017	Friday 8:00pm	718,000	739,000
14	"The Battles, Part 2"	February 23, 2017	Thursday 8:00pm	n/a	n/a
15	"The Battles, Part 3"	February 24, 2017	Friday 8:00pm	627,000	677,000
16	"The Battles, Part 4"	March 2, 2017	Thursday 8:00pm	n/a	n/a
17	"The Knockouts, Part 1"	March 3, 2017	Friday 8:00pm	733,000	745,000
18	"The Knockouts, Part 2"	March 9, 2017	Thursday 8:00pm	n/a	n/a
19	"The Knockouts, Part 3"	March 10, 2017	Friday 8:00pm	649,000	680,000
20	"The Knockouts, Part 4"	March 17, 2017	Thursday 8:00pm	n/a	n/a
21	"Live show 1"	March 24, 2017	Friday 8:00pm	677,000	713,000
22	"Live show 2"	March 31, 2017	Friday 8:00pm	606,000	636,000
23	"Semifinal"	April 7, 2017	Friday 8:00pm	586,000	625,000
24	"Final"	April 14, 2017	Friday 8:00pm	671,000	712,000

Notes

- Rating is the average number of viewers during the program.
- The latest weekly ratings contain timeshift viewing only during the same day. Older weekly ratings contain timeshift viewing during seven days.
