= The Voice of Finland season 4 =

The Voice of Finland
- Season 4
- Hosted by: Axl Smith (host); Jenni Alexandrova (backstage reporter)
- Judges: Tarja Turunen; Olli Lindholm; Redrama; Michael Monroe
- Winner: Miia Kosunen
- Winning coach: Tarja Turunen
- Runner-up: Jani Klemola
- Finals venue: Logomo

Release
- Original network: Nelonen
- Original release: January 2 – April 17, 2015

Season chronology
- ← Previous; Season 3 Next → Season 5

The Voice of Finland (season 4) is the fourth season of the Finnish reality singing competition based on The Voice format. The season premiered on Nelonen on January 2, 2015.

The coaches are singer Tarja Turunen, Olli Lindholm, Redrama and Michael Monroe. Axl Smith hosts the program.

== Teams ==
Color Key

- Winner
- Runner-up
- Third/fourth place
- Eliminated in the Live Shows
- Eliminated in the Knockout rounds
- Artist was stolen by another coach in the Battle rounds
- Eliminated in the Battle rounds
- Withdrew

Coaches	Top 49 artists			
Olli Lindholm				
Olli Lindholm	Jani Klemola	Maria Höglund	Minna Hautakangas	Ari Puro
Olli Lindholm	Amanda Kauppinen	Margarita Haatanen	Petri Räikkönen	Sarah Tianen
Olli Lindholm	Antti Haverinen	Elina Niemi	Hilja Järvinen	Markus Liukkonen
Olli Lindholm	Sara Karvanen	Suvi Salospohja		
Redrama				
Redrama	Jesper Anttonen	Kaisa Leskinen	Sini Järvinen	Kiia Kullberg
Redrama	Daniel S. Diago	Diana Drathen	Elna Romberg	Satu Kopo
Redrama	~~Heidi Sundström~~	~~Kai Linsén~~	~~Margarita Haatanen~~	Juha Vennola
Redrama	Mikko Pettinen	Reetta Lantta	Tom Eklund	
Tarja Turunen				
Tarja Turunen	Miia Kostunen	Avin Alyasi	Paolo Ribaldini	Riina Ammesmäki
Tarja Turunen	Heikki Mäkäräinen	Heidi Sundström	Raakel Korhola	Fabiane Laube
Tarja Turunen	~~Kevin Stocks~~	~~Satu Kopo~~	Aniia Timonen	Laura Leogrande
Tarja Turunen	Lesmana Vilmi	Sara Hanski		
Michael Monroe				
Michael Monroe	Jennie Storbacka	Kevin Stocks	Kimmo Blom	Björn Suomivuori
Michael Monroe	Kai Linsén	Miro Mikael	Sara Strömmer	Tina Sandqvist
Michael Monroe	~~Jesper Anttonen~~	~~Raakel Korhola~~	~~Sarah Tianen~~	Annabelle Kilpinen
Michael Monroe	Jaakko Heiska	Noora Hakala		
Note: Italicized names are stolen contestants (names struck through within former teams).

== Episodes ==
=== The Blind Auditions ===
Key	Coach hit his or her "I WANT YOU" button	Contestant eliminated with no coach pressing his or her "I WANT YOU" button	Contestant defaulted to this coach's team	Contestant elected to join this coach's team

==== Episode 1: January 2, 2015 ====
Order	Contestant	Song	Coaches' and Contestants' Choices			
Order	Contestant	Song	Olli Lindholm	Redrama	Tarja Turunen	Michael Monroe
1	Johanna Takalo	"Toinen"	—	—	—	—
2	Kai Linsén	"Harder to Breathe"				
3	Emilie Untamala	"Warwick Avenue"	—	—	—	—
4	Kimmo Blom	"Separate Ways (Worlds Apart)"				
5	Juhani Vahto	"Valot"	—	—	—	—
6	Sara Strömmer	"Piece of My Heart"	—	—	—	
7	Amanda Kauppinen	"Hetki lyö"				
8	Aukusti Saarijärvi	"Marras"	—	—	—	—
9	Reetta Lantta	"Ain't No Other Man"				
10	Anna Kabanen	"Vadelmavene"	—	—	—	—
11	Heikki Mäkäräinen	"Grace Kelly"		—		—
12	Maria Höglund	"Always on My Mind"		—		—

==== Episode 2: January 9, 2015 ====
Order	Contestant	Song	Coaches' and Contestants' Choices			
Order	Contestant	Song	Olli Lindholm	Redrama	Tarja Turunen	Michael Monroe
1	Jani Klemola	"En mitään, en ketään"		—		—
2	Tiia Laakso	"Airplanes"	—	—	—	—
3	Kevin Stocks	"It's Not Unusual"				
4	Jukka Karjalainen	"Dancing in the Dark"	—	—	—	—
5	Linn Ekebom	"Bubbly"	—	—	—	—
6	Tom Eklund	"Naiselleni"				
7	Niina Hell-Lång	"Enkelten kaupunki"	—	—	—	—
8	Riina Ammesmäki	"Titanium"		—		—

==== Episode 3: January 15, 2015 ====
Order	Contestant	Song	Coaches' and Contestants' Choices			
Order	Contestant	Song	Olli Lindholm	Redrama	Tarja Turunen	Michael Monroe
1	Arvo Jean-Michael Saarinen	"Lonely Boy"	—	—	—	—
2	Miro Miikael	"Sex on Fire"		—		
3	Riitta Leivo	"Crazy"	—	—	—	—
4	Sara Karvanen	"Hölmö rakkaus"		—	—	—
5	Laura Leogrande	"Don't Stop Me Now"	—	—		—
6	Diana Drathen	"Rolling in the Deep"				—
7	Tina Sandqvist	"Crazy"	—	—		
8	Sara Kypärä	"This Love"	—	—	—	—

==== Episode 4: January 16, 2015 ====
Order	Contestant	Song	Coaches' and Contestants' Choices			
Order	Contestant	Song	Olli Lindholm	Redrama	Tarja Turunen	Michael Monroe
1	Lesmana Vilmi	"Something's Got a Hold on Me"		—		
2	Lumi Summer	"When the Saints Go Marching In"	—	—	—	—
3	Timo Mäenpää	"Täältä ikuisuuteen"	—	—	—	—
4	Björn Suomivuori	"Bed of Roses"	—	—		
5	Iitu Häkkänen	"Price Tag"	—	—	—	—
6	Petri Räikkönen	"Joki"		—	—	—
7	Miia Kosunen	"Stand My Ground"				

==== Episode 5: January 22, 2015 ====
Order	Contestant	Song	Coaches' and Contestants' Choices			
Order	Contestant	Song	Olli Lindholm	Redrama	Tarja Turunen	Michael Monroe
1	Paolo Ribaldini	"Don't Stop Believin'"				
2	Ina Möller	"Stay with Me"	—	—	—	—
3	Ari Puro	"Siivet"		—		—
4	Elina Niemi	"Tuulen värit"		—	—	
5	Janet Lauronen	"One of Us"	—	—	—	—
6	Margarita Haatanen	"Sir Duke"			—	—
7	Jaakko Heiska	"Hate Me!"		—	—	

==== Episode 6: January 23, 2015 ====
Order	Contestant	Song	Coaches' and Contestants' Choices			
Order	Contestant	Song	Olli Lindholm	Redrama	Tarja Turunen	Michael Monroe
1	Johanna Tolonen	"Rehab"	—	—	—	—
2	Heidi Sundström	"Väärinpäin lentävät linnut"	—		—	—
3	Elna Romberg	"You've Got a Friend"				
4	Markus Lakanen	"Life on Mars?"	—	—	—	—
5	Kiia Kullberg	"Don't Know Why"				
6	Ilona Sola	"Fuck You"	—	—	—	—
7	Sara Hanski	"My Immortal"		—		—
8	Markus Liukkonen	"Kaksi puuta"		—	—	—

==== Episode 7: January 29, 2015 ====
Order	Contestant	Song	Coaches' and Contestants' Choices			
Order	Contestant	Song	Olli Lindholm	Redrama	Tarja Turunen	Michael Monroe
1	Sanna-Mari Titov	"Kuurupiiloa"	—	—	—	—
2	Anniina Timonen	"Lady Marmalade"		—		—
3	Marjut and Sonja Viinikanoja	"Raito ranta kaartaa"	—	—	—	—
4	Antti Haverinen	"Moottoritie on kuuma"		—	—	—
5	Noora Hakala	"Total Eclipse of the Heart"		—		
6	Juha Vennola	"Try"			—	—
7	Sarah Tiainen	"Alone"		—	—	

==== Episode 8: January 30, 2015 ====
Order	Contestant	Song	Coaches' and Contestants' Choices			
Order	Contestant	Song	Olli Lindholm	Redrama	Tarja Turunen	Michael Monroe
1	Satu Kopo	"Kolme vuodenaikaa"	—	—		—
2	Joni Koskimaa	"Nocturne"	—	—	—	—
3	Annabelle Kilpinen	"Stay with Me"		—	—	
4	Sara Nuutinen	"Jos mä oon oikee"	—	—	—	—
5	Minna Hautakangas	"Hallelujah"		—	—	—
6	Jesper Anttonen	"In Love with a Girl"	—	—		
7	Jennie Storbacka	"Baby, I Love You"				

==== Episode 9: February 5, 2015 ====
Order	Contestant	Song	Coaches' and Contestants' Choices			
Order	Contestant	Song	Olli Lindholm	Redrama	Tarja Turunen	Michael Monroe
1	Matti Isoperkkiö	"Here I Go Again"	—	—	—	—
2	Kaisa Leskinen	"Songbird"				
3	Stella Jacob	"Maailma on sun"	—	—	—	—
4	Matti Aspvik	"Don't You Worry Child"	—	—	—	—
5	Hilja Järvinen	"Eikö kukaan voi meitä pelastaa"		—	—	—
6	Avin Alyasi	"Ain't No Other Man"	—	—		—
7	Siiri Nilsson	"Sunrise"	—	—	—	—
8	Sini Järvinen	"If I Ain't Got You"				

==== Episode 10: February 6, 2015 ====
Order	Contestant	Song	Coaches' and Contestants' Choices			
Order	Contestant	Song	Olli Lindholm	Redrama	Tarja Turunen	Michael Monroe
1	Daniel S. Diago	"Use Somebody"				
2	Laura Hämäläinen	"Everybody's Free (To Feel Good)"	—	—	—	—
3	Joonas Leppä	"Wicked Game"	—	—	—	—
4	Raakel Korhola	"Love on Top"		—		
5	Mikko Pettinen	"Stand by Me"				—
6	Suvi Salospohja	"Koko kuva"		—	—	—
7	Varpu Otonkoski	"Counting Stars"	—	—	—	—
8	Maria Kiiski	"Daddy"	—	—	—	—
9	Fabiane Laube	"Ave Maria"	—	—		—

=== Battle rounds ===
During battle rounds, coaches divide contestants to pairs or triples and give them a song to perform. Coach then choose a winner to continue to the Knock Out phase. The losing contestant can still be stolen by another coach, as each coach can make two steals. Each coach is also joined by an adviser, with Michael Monroe being joined by Sami Yaffa from Hanoi Rocks, Olli Lindholm by singer Janna, Tarja Turunen by Samu Haber from Sunrise Avenue and Redrama by rapper Kasmir.

Colour key

✔	Coach hit his/her "I WANT YOU" button
	Artist won the Battle and advanced to the Knockouts
	Artist lost the Battle but was stolen by another coach and advances to the Knockouts
	Artist lost the Battle and was eliminated

==== Episode 11: February 13, 2015 ====
Order	Coach	Artists		Song	Coaches' and artists' choices			
Order	Coach	Artists		Song	Olli Lindholm	Redrama	Tarja Turunen	Michael Monroe
1	Michael Monroe	Jennie Storbacka	Raakel Korhola	"Nutbush City Limits"	✔	—	✔	—N/a
2	Olli Lindholm	Ari Puro	Suvi Salospohja	"Jos sä tahdot niin"	—N/a	—	—	—
3	Tarja Turunen	Lesmana Vilmi	Fabiane Laube	"There Must Be an Angel (Playing with My Heart)"	—	—	—N/a	—
4	Redrama	Daniel S. Diago	Kai Linsén	"Crazy"	—	—N/a	—	✔
5	Tarja Turunen	Avin Alyasi	Laura Leogrande	"How Will I Know"	—	—	—N/a	—
6	Olli Lindholm	Jani Klemola	Markus Liukkonen	"Enkelit lentää sun uniin"	—N/a	—	—	—
7	Michael Monroe	Miro Miikael	Jesper Anttonen	"The Phoenix"	✔	✔	—	—N/a
8	Redrama	Sini Järvinen	Reetta Lantta / Mikko Pettinen	"Ainutkertainen"	—	—N/a	—	—

==== Episode 12: February 20, 2015 ====
Order	Coach	Artists		Song	Coaches' and artists' choices			
Order	Coach	Artists		Song	Olli Lindholm	Redrama	Tarja Turunen	Michael Monroe
1	Redrama	Heidi Sundström	Kiia Kullberg	"Beibi"	✔	—N/a	✔	✔
2	Tarja Turunen	Paolo Ribaldini	Satu Kopo	"Every Breath You Take"	✔	✔	—N/a	—
3	Olli Lindholm	Petri Räikkönen	Antti Haverinen	"Tahdon rakastella sinua"	—N/a	—	—	—
4	Michael Monroe	Kimmo Blom	Sarah Tiainen	"Cold as Ice"	✔	—	—	—N/a
5	Olli Lindholm	Minna Hautakangas	Elina Niemi	"Jos mikään ei riitä"	—N/a	—	—	—
6	Redrama	Margarita Haatanen	Elna Romberg	"Saving All My Love for You"	✔	—N/a	—	—
7	Tarja Turunen	Anniina Timonen	Heikki Mäkäräinen	"Easy Lover"	—	—	—N/a	—
8	Michael Monroe	Jaakko Heiska	Sara Strömmer	"Please Don't Touch"	—	—	—	—N/a

==== Episode 13: February 27, 2015 ====
Order	Coach	Artists		Song	Coaches' and artists' choices			
Order	Coach	Artists		Song	Olli Lindholm	Redrama	Tarja Turunen	Michael Monroe
1	Tarja Turunen	Sara Hanski	Miia Kosunen	"Numb"	—	—	—N/a	—
2	Redrama	Diana Drathen	Juha Vennola	"Story of My Life"	—	—N/a	—	—
3	Michael Monroe	Annabella Kilpinen	Björn Suomivuori	"Senza una donna"	—	—	—	—N/a
4	Olli Lindholm	Maria Höglund	Hilja Järvinen	"It's Not Goodbye"	—N/a	—	—	—
5	Tarja Turunen	Riina Ammesmäki	Kevin Stocks	"Don't Cry"	—	—	—N/a	✔
6	Redrama	Kaisa Leskinen	Tom Eklund	"Happy Together"	—	—N/a	—	—
7	Michael Monroe	Tina Sandqvist	Noora Hakala	"Fire and Ice"	—	—	—	—N/a
8	Olli Lindholm	Sara Karvanen	Amanda Kauppinen	"Rakkauden jälkeen"	—N/a	—	—	—

=== The Knockouts ===
Color key:

Artist won the Knockouts and advances to the Live shows
Artist lost the Knockouts and was eliminated

Episode & Date	Coach	Order	Song	Artists		Song
Episode 14 (March 6)	Michael Monroe	1	"Since You Been Gone"	Tina Sandqvist	Kimmo Blom	"Radio Ga Ga"
Episode 14 (March 6)	Tarja Turunen	2	"You Raise Me Up"	Avin Alyasi	Fabiane Laube	"Memory"
Episode 14 (March 6)	Redrama	3	"Kiss You"	Jesper Anttonen	Daniel S. Diago	"We Found Love"
Episode 14 (March 6)	Olli Lindholm	4	"Lautturi"	Petri Räikkönen	Ari Puro	"Valkeaa unelmaa"
Episode 14 (March 6)	Michael Monroe	5	"I Don't Want to Be"	Björn Suomivuori	Sara Strömmer	"You Oughta Know"
Episode 14 (March 6)	Tarja Turunen	6	"Jos mä oon oikee"	Heidi Sundström	Paolo Ribaldini	"I Want to Know What Love Is"
Episode 14 (March 6)	Redrama	7	"Vain rakkaus"	Kaisa Leskinen	Satu Kopo	"Ainutlaatuinen"
Episode 14 (March 6)	Olli Lindholm	8	"Can You See Me?"	Minna Hautakangas	Margarita Haatanen	"River Deep – Mountain High"
Episode 15 (March 13)	Redrama	1	"Love Never Felt So Good"	Kiia Kullberg	Diana Drathen	"Come Back and Stay"
Episode 15 (March 13)	Redrama	2	"Vision of Love"	Elna Romberg	Sini Järvinen	"Hold the Line"
Episode 15 (March 13)	Olli Lindholm	3	"The Winner Takes It All"	Maria Höglund	Sarah Tiainen	"We Don't Need Another Hero"
Episode 15 (March 13)	Olli Lindholm	4	"Eva"	Amanda Kauppinen	Jani Klemola	"Joka päivä ja joka ikinen yö"
Episode 15 (March 13)	Michael Monroe	5	"Delilah"	Kevin Stocks	Miro Miikael	"I Don't Want to Miss a Thing"
Episode 15 (March 13)	Michael Monroe	6	"Stone Cold Sober"	Kai Linsén	Jennie Storbacka	"I Care"
Episode 15 (March 13)	Tarja Turunen	7	"Chandelier"	Raakel Korhola	Miia Kosunen	"Kuu saa valtansa auringolta"
Episode 15 (March 13)	Tarja Turunen	8	"Just the Way You Are"	Heikki Mäkäräinen	Riina Ammesmäki	"The Edge of Glory"

== Live shows ==
Colour key

Artist was saved by the Public's vote
Artist was saved by his/her coach
Artist was eliminated

=== Live 1 (March 22) ===
Order	Coach	Artist	Song	Result
1	Redrama	Sini Järvinen	"No Air"	Redrama's vote
2	Tarja Turunen	Riina Ammesmäki	"Sä et ole hullu"	Eliminated
3	Redrama	Kiia Kullberg	"Love Me Harder"	Eliminated
4	Tarja Turunen	Avin Alyasi	"I Will Love Again"	Turunen's vote
5	Redrama	Jesper Anttonen	"Lego House"	Public's vote
6	Tarja Turunen	Miia Kosunen	"She Wolf (Falling to Pieces)"	Public's vote
7	Redrama	Kaisa Leskinen	"Sama nainen"	Public's vote
8	Tarja Turunen	Paolo Ribaldini	"Hunting High and Low"	Public's vote

=== Live 2 (March 27) ===
Order	Coach	Artist	Song	Result
1	Olli Lindholm	Maria Höglund	"Let It Go"	Public's vote
2	Michael Monroe	Kimmo Blom	"In the Air Tonight"	Monroe's vote
3	Olli Lindholm	Minna Hautakangas	"Tuuleksi taivaanrantaan"	Lindholm's vote
4	Michael Monroe	Kevin Stocks	"Fire"	Public's vote
5	Olli Lindholm	Ari Puro	"Elämän nälkä"	Eliminated
6	Michael Monroe	Björn Suomivuori	"A Whiter Shade of Pale"	Eliminated
7	Olli Lindholm	Jani Klemola	"Tuulilasin nurkkaan"	Public's vote
8	Michael Monroe	Jennie Storbacka	"Sun oon"	Public's vote

=== Live 3 (April 3) ===
Order	Coach	Artist	Song	Result
1	Olli Lindholm	Minna Hautakangas	"Lintu ja lapsi"	Eliminated
2	Olli Lindholm	Maria Höglund	"Holiday"	Lindholm's vote
3	Olli Lindholm	Jani Klemola	"Kauas pilvet karkaavat"	Public's vote
4	Tarja Turunen	Paolo Ribaldini	"Still Loving You"	Eliminated
5	Tarja Turunen	Miia Kosunen	"The Power of Love"	Public's vote
6	Tarja Turunen	Avin Alyasi	"In the Heat of the Night"	Turunen's vote
7	Redrama	Jesper Anttonen	"Roadhouse Blues"	Public's vote
8	Redrama	Kaisa Leskinen	"Villejä lupiineja"	Redrama's vote
9	Redrama	Sini Järvinen	"Always on the Run"	Eliminated
10	Michael Monroe	Jennie Storbacka	"Set Fire to the Rain"	Public's vote
11	Michael Monroe	Kimmo Blom	"I'll Wait"	Eliminated
12	Michael Monroe	Kevin Stocks	"Rocket"	Monroe's vote

=== Semifinal (April 10) ===
Competition performances

Order	Coach	Artist	Song	Result
1	Olli Lindholm	Maria Höglund	"Hello"	Eliminated
2	Olli Lindholm	Jani Klemola	"Tykkään susta niin että halkeen"	Advancing
3	Michael Monroe	Kevin Stocks	"A Girl Like You"	Eliminated
4	Michael Monroe	Jennie Storbacka	"Suru on kunniavieras"	Advancing
5	Redrama	Kaisa Lehtinen	"50 Ways to Leave Your Lover"	Eliminated
6	Redrama	Jesper Anttonen	"What I Like About You"	Advancing
7	Tarja Turunen	Avin Alyasi	"It's My Life"	Eliminated
8	Tarja Turunen	Miia Kosunen	"Wrecking Ball"	Advancing

=== Final (April 17) ===
Competition performances

Performance Order	Coach	Contestant	Type	Song	Result
1	Olli Lindholm	Jani Klemola	Duet	"Ihmisen poika" (with Olli Lindholm)	Runner-up
2	Redrama	Jesper Anttonen	Duet	"Forcefield" (with Redrama)	3rd-4th place
3	Tarja Turunen	Miia Kosunen	Duet	"Never Enough" (with Tarja Turunen)	Winner
4	Michael Monroe	Jennie Storbacka	Duet	"Don't You Ever Leave Me" (with Michael Monroe)	3rd-4th place
5	Olli Lindholm	Jani Klemola	Solo	"Sinä ansaitset kultaa"	Runner-up
6	Redrama	Jesper Anttonen	Solo	"All of Me"	3rd-4th place
7	Tarja Turunen	Miia Kosunen	Solo	"Bed On Fire"	Winner
8	Michael Monroe	Jennie Storbacka	Solo	"Mamma Knows Best"	3rd-4th place

== Elimination Chart ==
=== Overall ===
Color key
Artist's info

- Team Michael
- Team Tarja
- Team Olli
- Team Redrama

Result details

- Winner
- Runner-up
- 3rd-4th place
- Artist was saved by the public
- Artist was saved by his/her coach
- Artist advanced to the finals
- Artist was eliminated
- Artist did not perform on that particular week

Live show results per week
Artist	Week 1	Week 2	Week 3	Week 4	Finals
Mila Kosunen	Safe		Safe	Safe	Winner
Jani Klemola		Safe	Safe	Safe	Runner-up
Jennie Storbacka		Safe	Safe	Safe	3rd-4th place
Jesper Anttonen	Safe		Safe	Safe	3rd-4th place
Avin Alyasi	Safe		Safe	Eliminated	Eliminated (Week 4)
Kaisa Lehtinen	Safe		Safe	Eliminated	Eliminated (Week 4)
Kevin Stocks		Safe	Safe	Eliminated	Eliminated (Week 4)
Maria Hödlund		Safe	Safe	Eliminated	Eliminated (Week 4)
Kimmo Blom		Safe	Eliminated	Eliminated (Week 3)	
Minna Hautakangas		Safe	Eliminated	Eliminated (Week 3)	
Paolo Ribaldini	Safe		Eliminated	Eliminated (Week 3)	
Sini Järvinen	Safe		Eliminated	Eliminated (Week 3)	
Ari Puro		Eliminated	Eliminated (Week 2)		
Björn Suomivuori		Eliminated	Eliminated (Week 2)		
Kiia Kullberg	Eliminated	Eliminated (Week 1)			
Riina Amnesmäki	Eliminated	Eliminated (Week 1)			
