= The Voice of Finland season 5 =

The Voice of Finland
- Season 5
- Hosted by: Axl Smith (host); Heikki Paasonen (host); Jenni Alexandrova (backstage); Tinni Wikström (social media)
- Judges: Tarja Turunen; Olli Lindholm; Redrama; Michael Monroe
- Winner: Suvi Åkerman
- Winning coach: Tarja Turunen
- Runner-up: Riikka Jaakkola
- Finals venue: Logomo

Release
- Original network: Nelonen
- Original release: January 8 – April 22, 2016

Season chronology
- ← Previous; Season 4 Next → Season 6

The Voice of Finland (season 5) was the fifth season of the Finnish reality singing competition based on The Voice format. The season premiered on Nelonen on January 8, 2016. The live final aired on April 22, 2016.

The coaches were singer Tarja Turunen, Olli Lindholm, Redrama and Michael Monroe. Axl Smith hosted the program from blind auditions to the knockouts. Heikki Paasonen hosted the live shows.

== Teams ==
Color Key

- Winner
- Runner-up
- Third place
- Fourth place
- Eliminated in the Live Semi-final
- Eliminated in the 3rd week of Live Shows
- Eliminated in the 1st and 2nd week of Live Shows
- Artist was stolen by another coach in the Knockout rounds
- Eliminated in the Knockout rounds
- Artist was stolen by another coach in the Battle rounds
- Eliminated in the Battle rounds
- Withdrew

Coaches	Top 48 artists			
Olli Lindholm				
Olli Lindholm	Ilona Gill	Suhyun Kim	Jessica Uussaari	Lilja Tzoulas
Olli Lindholm	Emmi Uusitalo	Jere Hämäläinen	Mitra Matouf	Marko Simi
Olli Lindholm	~~Meri Vahtera~~	Oona Immonen	Jani Vahto	Kirsi Mäkiniemi
Olli Lindholm	Katja Felin	Mikko Töyssy		
Redrama				
Redrama	Meri Vahtera	Anna Karlsson	Alex Ikonen	Margarita Kondakova
Redrama	~~Daniel Sanz~~	~~Ilona Gill~~	Ville Niskanen	Roosa Hietanen
Redrama	Jonna Heikkilä	Vera Forsberg	Ismo Virlander	Iina Hietanen
Redrama	Minna Viitanen	Cassandra Lindholm		
Tarja Turunen				
Tarja Turunen	Suvi Åkerman	Ilari Hämäläinen	Kerttu Suonpää	Alisa Manninen
Tarja Turunen	Yamila Espinosa	Lauri Peisterä	Petri Myllymäki	Emma Sandström
Tarja Turunen	~~Mitra Matouf~~	~~Salli Helminen~~	Iida Repo	Erik Karhatsu
Tarja Turunen	Noel Cavernelis	Gemma Grundy		
Michael Monroe				
Michael Monroe	Riikka Jaakkola	Tuomas Junnikkala	Daniel Sanz	Jarkko Kujanpää
Michael Monroe	~~Alisa Manninen~~	~~Alex Ikonen~~	Salli Helminen	Steve Lee
Michael Monroe	~~Emma Sandström~~	Juanma Draven	Essi Putkonen	Mikael Sirén
Michael Monroe	Riku Turunen	Raimo Junnikkala		
Note: Italicized names are stolen contestants (names struck through within former teams).

== Episodes ==
=== The Blind Auditions ===
Key	Coach hit his or her "I WANT YOU" button	Contestant eliminated with no coach pressing his or her "I WANT YOU" button	Contestant defaulted to this coach's team	Contestant elected to join this coach's team

==== Episode 1: January 8, 2016 ====
Order	Contestant	Song	Coaches' and Contestants' Choices			
Order	Contestant	Song	Olli Lindholm	Redrama	Tarja Turunen	Michael Monroe
1	Katja Felin	"Beibi"				
2	Daniel Sanz	"All of Me"				—
3	Anna Ijäs	"Prinsessalle"	—	—	—	—
4	Lauri Peisterä	"Hit the Road Jack"		—		—
5	Ville Niskanen	"Stay"			—	—
6	Minttu Jokinen	"Wicked Game"	—	—	—	—
7	Lilja Tzoulas	"Hetken tie on kevyt"		—	—	—
8	Steve Lee	"Come Together"/"Lose Yourself"	—		—	
9	Veera Kaasalainen	"Vadelmavene"	—	—	—	—
10	Marko Kare	"Älä mene pois (Anssi Kela song)"	—	—	—	—
11	Kerttu Suonpää	"Born This Way"				

==== Episode 2: January 14, 2016 ====
Order	Contestant	Song	Coaches' and Contestants' Choices			
Order	Contestant	Song	Olli Lindholm	Redrama	Tarja Turunen	Michael Monroe
1	Mikael Happonen	"Sinä ansaitset kultaa"	—	—	—	—
2	Cassandra Lindholm	"You Shook Me All Night Long"			—	—
3	Riku Karvonen	"Simple Man"	—	—	—	—
4	Jessica Uussaari	"Kesällä kerran"				
5	Iida Repo	"Diamonds Are Forever"		—		
6	Minna Frimodig	"Vanha sydän"	—	—	—	—
7	Juanma Draven	"Whole Lotta Love"				

==== Episode 3: January 15, 2016 ====
Order	Contestant	Song	Coaches' and Contestants' Choices			
Order	Contestant	Song	Olli Lindholm	Redrama	Tarja Turunen	Michael Monroe
1	Alisa Manninen	"I Try"		—		
2	Vili Lehtelä	"Muutkin mokaa"	—	—	—	—
3	Jonna Heikkilä	"On se hienoo"			—	—
4	Noel Cavernelis	"Say Something"	—	—		—
5	Maria Saarimaa-Ylitalo	"Jos menet pois"	—	—	—	—
6	Vera Forsberg	"Love Me Harder"			—	—
7	Ilari Hämäläinen	"Hello"				

==== Episode 4: January 21, 2016 ====
Order	Contestant	Song	Coaches' and Contestants' Choices			
Order	Contestant	Song	Olli Lindholm	Redrama	Tarja Turunen	Michael Monroe
1	Yamila Espinosa	"El Mundo Bailando"		—		
2	Ilari Kekki	"Not in That Way"	—	—	—	—
3	Riikka Jaakkola	"Mama Kin"		—	—	
4	Ville Erola	"Minä olen muistanut"	—	—	—	—
5	Juulia Koivisto	"Rannalla"	—	—	—	—
6	Oona Immonen	"You Had Me"		—	—	—
7	Erik Karhatsu	"The Show Must Go On"				

==== Episode 5: January 22, 2016 ====
Order	Contestant	Song	Coaches' and Contestants' Choices			
Order	Contestant	Song	Olli Lindholm	Redrama	Tarja Turunen	Michael Monroe
1	Mikko Töyssy	"Villihevosia"		—	—	
2	Riku Turunen	"The Evil That Men Do"				
3	Emmi Uusitalo	"Tuulee"		—	—	—
4	Heini Davidson	"Odotus"	—	—	—	—
5	Gemma Grundy	"Black Velvet"		—		—
6	Mia Hammarén	"Son of a Preacher Man"	—	—	—	—
7	Margarita Kondakova	"Something's Got a Hold on Me"				

==== Episode 6: January 28, 2016 ====
Order	Contestant	Song	Coaches' and Contestants' Choices			
Order	Contestant	Song	Olli Lindholm	Redrama	Tarja Turunen	Michael Monroe
1	Mitra Matouf	"Mamma Knows Best"		—		
2	Jere Hämäläinen	"Wagon Wheel"		—	—	—
3	Erika Lindgren	"Minä sinua vaan"	—	—	—	—
4	Tuomas Junnikkala	"Unchain My Heart"		—		
5	Matti Rockell	"Nahkatakkinen tyttö"	—	—	—	—
6	Kirsi Mäkiniemi	"Prinsessalle"		—	—	—
7	Ilona Gill	"Yellow"				

==== Episode 7: January 29, 2016 ====
Order	Contestant	Song	Coaches' and Contestants' Choices			
Order	Contestant	Song	Olli Lindholm	Redrama	Tarja Turunen	Michael Monroe
1	Salli Helminen	"The Story"		—		
2	Helena Suomala	"Nyt mä meen"	—	—	—	—
3	Alex Ikonen	"The Way You Look Tonight"	—	—	—	
4	Henriikka Warmbold	"I Wish"	—	—	—	—
5	Jouni Lund	"Superstar"	—	—	—	—
6	Roosa Hietanen	"What a Wonderful World"				
7	Iina Hietanen	"Something's Got a Hold on Me"				

==== Episode 8: February 4, 2016 ====
Order	Contestant	Song	Coaches' and Contestants' Choices			
Order	Contestant	Song	Olli Lindholm	Redrama	Tarja Turunen	Michael Monroe
1	Anna Karlsson	"Fight Song"			—	
2	Mikael Sirén	"Walking in Memphis"	—	—	—	
3	Essi Putkonen	"Kun"				
4	Salla Saarijärvi	"Maailma on sun"	—	—	—	—
5	Vilma Nieminen	"Skyfall"	—	—	—	—
6	Marko Simi	"Meillä on aikaa"		—	—	
7	Suhyun Kim	"If I Ain't Got You"		—	—	

==== Episode 9: February 5, 2016 ====
Order	Contestant	Song	Coaches' and Contestants' Choices			
Order	Contestant	Song	Olli Lindholm	Redrama	Tarja Turunen	Michael Monroe
1	Saija Saarinen	"New York"	—	—	—	—
2	Raimo Junnikkala	"All I Have to Do Is Dream"		—	—	
3	Christopher Proctor	"You Know I'm No Good"	—	—	—	—
4	Meri Vahtera	"Kii"		—	—	—
5	Fanny Kivistö	"Airplanes"	—	—	—	—
6	Petri Myllymäki	"Con te partirò"				—
7	Minna Viitanen	"Rather Be"				

==== Episode 10: February 11, 2016 ====
Order	Contestant	Song	Coaches' and Contestants' Choices			
Order	Contestant	Song	Olli Lindholm	Redrama	Tarja Turunen	Michael Monroe
1	Ismo Virlander	"Purple Rain"				
2	Tia Kiuru	"Säännöt rakkaudelle"	—	—	—	—
3	Max Blomberg	"Travelin' Band"	—	—	—	—
4	Jarkko Kujanpää	"Kirje"	—	—	—	
5	Emilia Kauppinen	"Iholla"	—	—	—	—
6	Suvi Åkerman	"Crazy"		—		—
7	Emma Sandström	"The Way You Make Me Feel"	—	—	—	
8	Martti Koivisto	"Yhtenä iltana"	—	—	—	—
9	Jani Vahto	"Nostalgia Osa 1"		—	—	—

=== Battle rounds ===
During battle rounds, coaches divide contestants to pairs and give them a song to perform. Coach then choose a winner to continue to the Knock Out phase. The losing contestant can still be stolen by another coach, as each coach can make one steal. Each coach is also joined by an adviser, with Michael Monroe being joined by Sami Yaffa from Hanoi Rocks, Olli Lindholm by singer Suvi Teräsniska, Tarja Turunen by Timo Kotipelto from Stratovarius, and Redrama by producer/songwriter MGI.

Colour key

✔	Coach hit his/her "I WANT YOU" button
	Artist won the Battle and advanced to the Knockouts
	Artist lost the Battle but was stolen by another coach and advances to the Knockouts
	Artist lost the Battle and was eliminated

==== Episode 11: February 12, 2016 ====
Order	Coach	Artists		Song	Coaches' and artists' choices			
Order	Coach	Artists		Song	Olli Lindholm	Redrama	Tarja Turunen	Michael Monroe
1	Redrama	Cassandra Lindholm	Anna Karlsson	"Genie In A Bottle"	—	—N/a	—	—
2	Olli Lindholm	Lilja Tzoulas	Mikko Töyssy	"Sydämeni osuman sai"	—N/a	—	—	—
3	Michael Monroe	Raimo Junnikkala	Alex Ikonen	"You've Lost That Lovin' Feelin'"	—	—	—	—N/a
4	Tarja Turunen	Mitra Matouf	Kerttu Suonpää	"Locked Out of Heaven"	✔	—	—N/a	✔

==== Episode 12: February 18, 2016 ====
Order	Coach	Artists		Song	Coaches' and artists' choices			
Order	Coach	Artists		Song	Olli Lindholm	Redrama	Tarja Turunen	Michael Monroe
1	Olli Lindholm	Emmi Uusitalo	Katja Felin	"Popmusiikkia"	Steal Used	—	—	—
2	Michael Monroe	Jarkko Kujanpää	Riku Turunen	"Rock 'n' Roll Outlaw'"	Steal Used	—	—	—N/a
3	Redrama	Roosa Hietanen	Minna Viitanen	"Kaunis päivä"	Steal Used	—N/a	—	—
4	Tarja Turunen	Yamila Espinosa	Gemma Grundy	"Listen"	Steal Used	—	—N/a	—

==== Episode 13: February 19, 2016 ====
Order	Coach	Artists		Song	Coaches' and artists' choices			
Order	Coach	Artists		Song	Olli Lindholm	Redrama	Tarja Turunen	Michael Monroe
1	Tarja Turunen	Salli Helminen	Suvi Åkerman	"Left Outside Alone"	Steal Used	—	—N/a	✔
2	Michael Monroe	Mikael Sirén	Tuomas Junnikkala	"Out of the Darkness'"	Steal Used	—	—	Steal Used
3	Redrama	Margareta Kondakova	Iina Hietanen	"Something's Got a Hold on Me"	Steal Used	—N/a	—	Steal Used
4	Olli Lindholm	Meri Vahtera	Marko Simi	"Jos tahdot tietää"	Steal Used	✔	✔	Steal Used

==== Episode 14: February 25, 2016 ====
Order	Coach	Artists		Song	Coaches' and artists' choices			
Order	Coach	Artists		Song	Olli Lindholm	Redrama	Tarja Turunen	Michael Monroe
1	Redrama	Ismo Virlander	Daniel Sanz	"Without You"	Steal Used	Steal Used	—	Steal Used
2	Michael Monroe	Riikka Jaakkola	Emma Sandström	"It's Only Love'"	Steal Used	Steal Used	✔	Steal Used
3	Tarja Turunen	Petri Myllymäki	Noel Cavernelis	"I Drove All Night"	Steal Used	Steal Used	Steal Used	Steal Used
4	Olli Lindholm	Jessica Uussaari	Kirsi Mäkiniemi	"Kuolevainen"	Steal Used	Steal Used	Steal Used	Steal Used

==== Episode 15: February 26, 2016 ====
Order	Coach	Artists		Song	Coaches' and artists' choices			
Order	Coach	Artists		Song	Olli Lindholm	Redrama	Tarja Turunen	Michael Monroe
1	Michael Monroe	Alisa Manninen	Essi Putkonen	"Papa Was a Rollin' Stone'"	Steal Used	Steal Used	Steal Used	Steal Used
2	Olli Lindholm	Jere Hämäläinen	Jani Vahto	"Valon pisaroita"	Steal Used	Steal Used	Steal Used	Steal Used
3	Redrama	Ilona Gill	Vera Forsberg	"Clown"	Steal Used	Steal Used	Steal Used	Steal Used
4	Tarja Turunen	Erik Karhatsu	Ilari Hämäläinen	"Resistance"	Steal Used	Steal Used	Steal Used	Steal Used

==== Episode 16: March 3, 2016 ====
Order	Coach	Artists		Song	Coaches' and artists' choices			
Order	Coach	Artists		Song	Olli Lindholm	Redrama	Tarja Turunen	Michael Monroe
1	Tarja Turunen	Lauri Peisterä	Iida Repo	"Puhu äänellä jonka kuulen"	Steal Used	Steal Used	Steal Used	Steal Used
2	Michael Monroe	Juanma Draven	Steve Lee	"Twilight Zone'"	Steal Used	Steal Used	Steal Used	Steal Used
3	Olli Lindholm	Oona Immonen	Suhyun Kim	"There You'll Be"	Steal Used	Steal Used	Steal Used	Steal Used
4	Redrama	Ville Niskanen	Jonna Heikkilä	"Airplanes"	Steal Used	Steal Used	Steal Used	Steal Used

== The Knockouts ==
For the knockouts, coaches group their contestants in pairs, or trios with the artist stolen during the Battle phase. This season, the coaches can steal one losing artist. Each night three coaches bring their artists on stage, and one coach watches all performances and eliminations and gives his/her choice from the losing artists in the end. The top 16 contestants will then move on to the live shows.

Color key:

Artist won the Knockout and advanced to the Live Shows
Artist lost the Knockout but was stolen by another coach and advanced to the Live Shows
Artist lost the Knockout and was eliminated

Episode	Coach	Order	Song	Artists		Song	'Steal' result			
Episode	Coach	Order	Song	Winner(s)	Loser	Song	Olli Lindholm	Redrama	Tarja Turunen	Michael Monroe
Episode 17 (March 4, 2016)	Redrama	1	"What's Up?"	Margarita Kondakova	Daniel Sanz	"Shut Up and Dance"	—	—N/a	—	✔
Episode 17 (March 4, 2016)	Tarja Turunen	2	"Hetki lyö"	Ilari Hämäläinen	Emma Sandström	"No More Drama"	—	—	—N/a	Team full
Episode 17 (March 4, 2016)	Olli Lindholm	3	"Make You Feel My Love"	Lilja Tzoulas	Marko Simi	"1972"	—N/a	—	—	Team full
Episode 17 (March 4, 2016)	Olli Lindholm	3	"Make You Feel My Love"	Lilja Tzoulas	Mitra Matouf	"You Lost Me"	—N/a	—	—	Team full
Episode 18 (March 10, 2016)
Episode 18 (March 10, 2016)	Tarja Turunen	1	"Feeling Good"	Suvi Åkerman	Petri Myllymäki	"Puhu hiljaa rakkaudesta"	—	—	—N/a	Team full
Episode 18 (March 10, 2016)	Redrama	2	"Bonfire Heart"	Anna Karlsson	Ilona Gill	"Can't Help Falling in Love"	✔	—N/a	—	Team full
Episode 18 (March 10, 2016)	Michael Monroe	3	"Send Me an Angel"	Jarkko Kujanpää	Steve Lee	"Hard to Handle"	Team full	—	—	Team full
Episode 18 (March 10, 2016)	Michael Monroe	3	"Send Me an Angel"	Jarkko Kujanpää	Salli Helminen	"Cry Me a River"	Team full	—	—	Team full
Episode 19 (March 17, 2016)
Episode 19 (March 17, 2016)	Olli Lindholm	1	"Maailma on kaunis"	Jessica Uussaari	Jere Hämäläinen	"Home"	Team full	—	—	Team full
Episode 19 (March 17, 2016)	Michael Monroe	2	"Here Without You"	Tuomas Junnikkala	Alisa Manninen	"Change the World"	Team full	—	✔	Team full
Episode 19 (March 17, 2016)	Redrama	3	"Hiljaisuus"	Meri Vahtera	Ville Niskanen	"What Do You Mean?"	Team full	—N/a	Team full	Team full
Episode 19 (March 17, 2016)	Redrama	3	"Hiljaisuus"	Meri Vahtera	Roosa Hietanen	"Run"	Team full	—N/a	Team full	Team full
Episode 20 (March 18, 2016)
Episode 20 (March 18, 2016)	Olli Lindholm	1	"Casualty of Love"	Suhyun Kim	Emmi Uusitalo	"Viimeinen aamu"	Team full	—	Team full	Team full
Episode 20 (March 18, 2016)	Michael Monroe	2	"Desperado"	Riikka Jaakkola	Alex Ikonen	"Georgia On My Mind"	Team full	✔	Team full	Team full
Episode 20 (March 18, 2016)	Tarja Turunen	3	"Crazy in Love"	Kerttu Suonpää	Lauri Peisterä	"Ain't Nobody"	Team full	Team full	Team full	Team full
Episode 20 (March 18, 2016)	Tarja Turunen	3	"Crazy in Love"	Kerttu Suonpää	Yamila Espinosa	"Hush Hush; Hush Hush"	Team full	Team full	Team full	Team full

== Live shows ==
Live shows began on March 25. At the end of each live show one singer from each team was eliminated. The public had the chance to vote for the contestants performing each night one week before and during the show, either by phone or by watching the official voting videos from their previous performances at Nelonen's Ruutu.fi website. It is also possible to buy votes for one's favorite singer. The live shows were aired on Friday at 8 PM EET from Logomo, Turku.

Colour key

Artist was saved by the Public's vote
Artist was saved by his/her coach
Artist was eliminated

=== Live 1 (March 25) ===
The first live show featured a group performance of "You're the Voice" by the singers from all four teams, and a performance by guest artist Kasmir ("Amen").

Order	Coach	Artist	Song	Result
1	Michael Monroe	Jarkko Kujanpää	"Easy Livin'"	Eliminated
2	Michael Monroe	Daniel Sanz	"Right Here Waiting"	Monroe's vote
3	Michael Monroe	Tuomas Junnikkala	"Gimme All Your Lovin'"	Public's vote
4	Michael Monroe	Riikka Jaakkola	"Kids in America"	Public's vote
5	Redrama	Margarita Kondakova	"Since U Been Gone"	Eliminated
6	Redrama	Alex Ikonen	"Stand by Me"	Public's vote
7	Redrama	Meri Vahtera	"Tequila"	Public's vote
8	Redrama	Anna Karlsson	"Demons"	Redrama's vote

=== Live 2 (April 1) ===
The Voice of Finland alumn Evelina and rapper Mikael Gabriel performed on the second live show ("Honey"/"Helium").

Order	Coach	Artist	Song	Result
1	Tarja Turunen	Ilari Hämäläinen	"Iholla"	Public's vote
2	Tarja Turunen	Alisa Manninen	"Cryin'"	Eliminated
3	Tarja Turunen	Suvi Åkerman	"Addicted to You"	Public's vote
4	Tarja Turunen	Kerttu Suonpää	"Kun olet poissa"	Turunen's vote
5	Olli Lindholm	Lilja Tzoulas	"Koneeseen kadonnut"	Eliminated
6	Olli Lindholm	Ilona Gill	"Imagine"	Public's vote
7	Olli Lindholm	Jessica Uussaari	"Kesäyö"	Lindholm's vote
8	Olli Lindholm	Suhyun Kim	"I Will Always Love You"	Public's vote

=== Live 3 (April 8) ===
All four teams started the show off by paying tribute to recently passed music greats with group performances: Redrama's team to Maurice White ("In the Stone"), Olli Lindholm's team to Glenn Frey ("Tequila Sunrise"), Tarja Turunen's team to David Bowie ("Let's Dance"), and Michael Monroe's team to Lemmy Kilmister ("Ace of Spades").

Order	Coach	Artist	Song	Result
1	Tarja Turunen	Kerttu Suonpää	"Ihmisten edessä"	Eliminated
2	Tarja Turunen	Ilari Hämäläinen	"Bed of Roses"	Turunen's vote
3	Tarja Turunen	Suvi Åkerman	"Hello"	Public's vote
4	Redrama	Meri Vahtera	"On elämä laina"	Public's vote
5	Redrama	Anna Karlsson	"Never Forget You"	Redrama's vote
6	Redrama	Alex Ikonen	"Don't Take It Too Hard"	Eliminated
7	Olli Lindholm	Ilona Gill	"Eternal Flame"	Lindholm's vote
8	Olli Lindholm	Jessica Uussaari	"Hän tanssi kanssa enkeleiden"	Eliminated
9	Olli Lindholm	Suhyun Kim	"Hurt"	Public's vote
10	Michael Monroe	Riikka Jaakkola	"The Boys of Summer"	Public's vote
11	Michael Monroe	Tuomas Junnikkala	"You Shook Me All Night Long"	Monroe's vote
12	Michael Monroe	Daniel Sanz	"Don't You Worry Child"	Public's vote

=== Semifinal (April 15) ===
The Voice of Finland winner from season 4, Miia Kosunen opened the show with her new single, "Kauneinta mitä mä tein". Also the finalist from The Voice of Finland season 1, Jesse Kaikuranta performed his new single "Takki auki tuulessa".

Competition performances

Order	Coach	Artist	Song	Result
1	Redrama	Meri Vahtera	"Eläköön"	Advanced
2	Redrama	Anna Karlsson	"Love the Way You Lie (Part II)"	Eliminated
3	Michael Monroe	Tuomas Junnikkala	"I'm on Fire"	Eliminated
4	Michael Monroe	Riikka Jaakkola	"Somebody to Love"	Advanced
5	Olli Lindholm	Suhyun Kim	"All by Myself"	Eliminated
6	Olli Lindholm	Ilona Gill	"Nothing Else Matters"	Advanced
7	Tarja Turunen	Suvi Åkerman	"Alive"	Advanced
8	Tarja Turunen	Ilari Hämäläinen	"Peltirumpu"	Eliminated

Semifinal results

Team	Artist	Coach points	Advance points	Public points	Total points	Result
Redrama	Anna Karlsson	40	51	50	141	Eliminated
Redrama	Meri Vahtera	60	49	50	159	Advanced to final
Michael Monroe	Tuomas Junnikkala	40	44	57	141	Eliminated
Michael Monroe	Riikka Jaakkola	60	56	43	159	Advanced to final
Olli Lindholm	Suhyun Kim	40	60	46	146	Eliminated
Olli Lindholm	Ilona Gill	60	40	54	154	Advanced to final
Tarja Turunen	Ilari Hämäläinen	40	56	52	148	Eliminated
Tarja Turunen	Suvi Åkerman	60	44	48	152	Advanced to final

=== Final (April 22) ===
The final show was opened with an instrumental tribute to recently passed music legend Prince ("Purple Rain"). The guest performers of the night were Andra Day ("Rise Up") and Lauri Tähkä ("Morsian").

Competition performances

Each finalist performed an original song and a duet with their team coach.

Performance Order	Coach	Contestant	Type	Song	Result
1	Redrama	Meri Vahtera	Duet	"Could You Be Loved" (with Redrama)	3rd place
2	Olli Lindholm	Ilona Gill	Duet	"Killing Me Softly with His Song" (with Olli Lindholm)	4th place
3	Michael Monroe	Riikka Jaakkola	Duet	"Stop Draggin' My Heart Around" (with Michael Monroe)	Runner-up
4	Tarja Turunen	Suvi Åkerman	Duet	"Bohemian Rhapsody" (with Tarja Turunen)	Winner
5	Olli Lindholm	Ilona Gill	Solo	"Oneway Trip"	3rd place
6	Michael Monroe	Riikka Jaakkola	Solo	"Don't Ask Me"	Runner-up
7	Tarja Turunen	Suvi Åkerman	Solo	"It's Not the End of the World"	Winner
8	Redrama	Meri Vahtera	Solo	"Tuulee"	3rd place

Final results

– Winner
– Runner-up
– 3rd/4th place

Artist	Team	% of votes	Result
Suvi Åkerman	Tarja Turunen	32,2	Winner
Riikka Jaakkola	Michael Monroe	25,9	Runner-up
Meri Vahtera	Redrama	21.2	3rd place
Ilona Gill	Olli Lindholm	20,7	4th place

== Elimination Chart ==
=== Overall ===
Color key
Artist's info

- Team Michael
- Team Tarja
- Team Olli
- Team Redrama

Result details

- Winner
- Runner-up
- Third place
- Fourth place
- Artist was saved by the public
- Artist was saved by his/her coach
- Artist advanced to the finals
- Artist was eliminated
- Artist did not perform on that particular week

Live show results per week
Artist	Week 1	Week 2	Week 3	Week 4	Finals
Suvi Åkerman		Safe	Safe	Safe	Winner
Riikka Jaakkola	Safe		Safe	Safe	Runner-up
Meri Vahtera	Safe		Safe	Safe	3rd place
Ilona Gill		Safe	Safe	Safe	4th place
Ilari Hämäläinen		Safe	Safe	Eliminated	Eliminated (Week 4)
Suhyun Kim		Safe	Safe	Eliminated	Eliminated (Week 4)
Anna Karlsson	Safe		Safe	Eliminated	Eliminated (Week 4)
Tuomas Junnikkala	Safe		Safe	Eliminated	Eliminated (Week 4)
Alex Ikonen	Safe		Eliminated	Eliminated (Week 3)	
Daniel Sanz	Safe		Eliminated	Eliminated (Week 3)	
Jessica Uussaari		Safe	Eliminated	Eliminated (Week 3)	
Kerttu Suonpää		Safe	Eliminated	Eliminated (Week 3)	
Alisa Manninen		Eliminated	Eliminated (Week 2)		
Lilja Tzoulas		Eliminated	Eliminated (Week 2)		
Jarkko Kujanpää	Eliminated	Eliminated (Week 1)			
Margarita Kondakova	Eliminated	Eliminated (Week 1)			

== Reception and TV ratings ==
The Voice of Finland airs twice a week, on Thursday and Friday evenings at 8:00 pm. The program didn't air on Friday, March 11, due to the Emma Awards show live broadcast. Only the higher rating for the week is given.

#	Episode	Original air date	Time	Rating on same day	Rating within 7 days
1	"Season 5 Premiere"	January 8, 2016	Friday 8:00pm	693,000	740,000
2	"The Blind Auditions, Part 2"	January 14, 2016	Thursday 8:00pm	n/a	n/a
3	"The Blind Auditions, Part 3"	January 15, 2016	Friday 8:00pm	597,000	657,000
4	"The Blind Auditions, Part 4"	January 21, 2016	Thursday 8:00pm	n/a	n/a
5	"The Blind Auditions, Part 5"	January 22, 2016	Friday 8:00pm	738,000	771,000
6	"The Blind Auditions, Part 6"	January 28, 2016	Thursday 8:00pm	n/a	n/a
7	"The Blind Auditions, Part 7"	January 29, 2016	Friday 8:00pm	677,000	718,000
8	"The Blind Auditions, Part 8"	February 4, 2016	Thursday 8:00pm	n/a	n/a
9	"The Blind Auditions, Part 9"	February 5, 2016	Friday 8:00pm	685,000	720,000
10	"The Blind Auditions, Part 10"	February 11, 2016	Thursday 8:00pm	n/a	n/a
11	"Battle Rounds, Part 1"	February 12, 2016	Friday 8:00pm	710,000	752,000
12	"Battle Rounds, Part 2"	February 18, 2016	Thursday 8:00pm	n/a	n/a
13	"Battle Rounds, Part 3"	February 19, 2016	Friday 8:00pm	697,000	733,000
14	"Battle Rounds, Part 4"	February 25, 2016	Thursday 8:00pm	n/a	n/a
15	"Battle Rounds, Part 5"	February 26, 2016	Friday 8:00pm	643,000	674,000
16	"Battle Rounds, Part 6"	March 3, 2016	Thursday 8:00pm	n/a	n/a
17	"Knockout Round, Part 1"	March 4, 2016	Friday 8:00pm	626,000	653,000
18	"Knockout Round, Part 2"	March 10, 2016	Thursday 8:00pm	565,000	605,000
19	"Knockout Round, Part 3"	March 17, 2016	Thursday 8:00pm	n/a	n/a
20	"Knockout Round, Part 4"	March 18, 2016	Friday 8:00pm	548,000	583,000
21	"Live show 1"	March 25, 2016	Friday 8:00pm	719,000	757,000
22	"Live show 2"	April 1, 2016	Friday 8:00pm	595,000	649,000
23	"Live show 3"	April 8, 2016	Friday 8:00pm	620,000	652,000
24	"Semifinal"	April 15, 2016	Friday 8:00pm	634,000	698,000
25	"Final"	April 22, 2016	Friday 8:00pm	749,000	771,000

Notes

- Rating is the average number of viewers during the program.
- The latest weekly ratings contain timeshift viewing only during the same day. Older weekly ratings contain timeshift viewing during seven days.
