= Iara =

Iara or IARA may refer to:

- Iara (mythology), a figure from Brazilian mythology
- Iara, Cluj, a commune in Cluj County, Romania
- Iara (Arieș), a tributary of the Arieș in Cluj County, Romania
- Iara, a tributary of the Petrilaca in Mureș County, Romania
- Iara, Madagascar, a town and commune
- Iara Oil Field, off the coast of Brazil
- Institute for Anthropological Research in Africa, Katholieke Universiteit Leuven, Belgium
- Islamic American Relief Agency
- Increasing absolute risk aversion, used in economics, finance, and decision theory
- Iara Dias dos Santos (born 1983), Brazilian singer and songwriter
- Iara Lee (born 1966), Brazilian film producer, director and activist
- Iara Rennó (born 1977), Brazilian singer-songwriter and record producer
- Iara Vargas (1921–2007), Brazilian philosopher and politician
- Iara Dos Santos (Shark-Girl), Marvel Comics character
