= Iara Dias dos Santos =

Brazilian-Finnish singer

Iara Dias dos Santos (Iara)
- Born: Iara Dias dos Santos; 11 September 1983 (age 43); Viçosa, Minas Gerais, Brazil
- Origin: Joensuu, Finland
- Genres: R&B; folk; Pop
- Occupations: Singer; songwriter; multi-instrumentalist
- Instruments: Guitar; percussion
- Years active: 2016–present
- Formerly of: Regional da Nair
- Website: www.iara.fi

Iara Dias dos Santos (born 11 September 1983) is a Brazilian singer and songwriter. She moved to Finland in 2014 to start a professional career in the music industry. She was selected to take part on The Voice of Finland in 2017 (6th Season). In her blind audition, she sang Corinne Bailey Rae's song "Put Your Records On" and two coaches turned the chair for her. Anna Puu and Olli Lindholm. She chose to take part on Anna's team.

== Life and career ==
Iara was born in the university city of Viçosa - Minas Gerais State, and has lived there until she finished her bachelor's degree in Management and International trade. She has lived and worked in Vitória (Espírito Santo) and Belo Horizonte (Minas Gerais) before she moved to Finland. In Vitória (Brazil), Iara took part (2010–2011) of a popular local samba band Regional da Nair, playing a percussion instrument. After moving to Belo Horizonte (Brazil), she made a few guest appearances in the local samba circuit.

In Joensuu (Finland), she performed a few times in small gatherings like pikkujoulu (little Christmas party) and birthday parties, local pubs and she is working on her first EP to be released in the summer 2017. Before taking part of The Voice of Finland, Iara took part at Joensuun Konservatorio (Conservatory of Joensuu) as a classical singing student in 2014. She graduated in International Project Management at TAMK (Tampere University of Applied Sciences) in December 2016, focusing her master thesis in the music industry.

== The Voice of Finland 2017 ==
Iara's audition for the Voice of Finland was aired on 10 February 2017 and two coaches turned their chair for her performance of Corinne Bailey Rae's song "Put Your Records On". She could choose between Anna Puu and Olli Lindholm and she chose to be part of the team Anna Puu. Redrama said Iara has something on her voice that can't be taught. She was born with it. She needed a help with technique and she could get that from the show. Anna Puu also complimented her voice saying: "I like the colour of your sound". She noticed that Iara was nervous but they could see her potential. Michael Monroe commented that it was great to have Iara on the show and that she has done a fantastic job.

On the battle round aired on 24 February, Iara and her teammate Mariia Kharlamova interpreted Ellie Goulding's song "Love Me Like You Do" and in a very solid performance, Iara won her coach's preference and remains on Anna Puu's team, who said she was following her intuition. Mariia Kharlamova was saved by Redrama and continues in the competition as well.
