= Michael Ekeghasi =

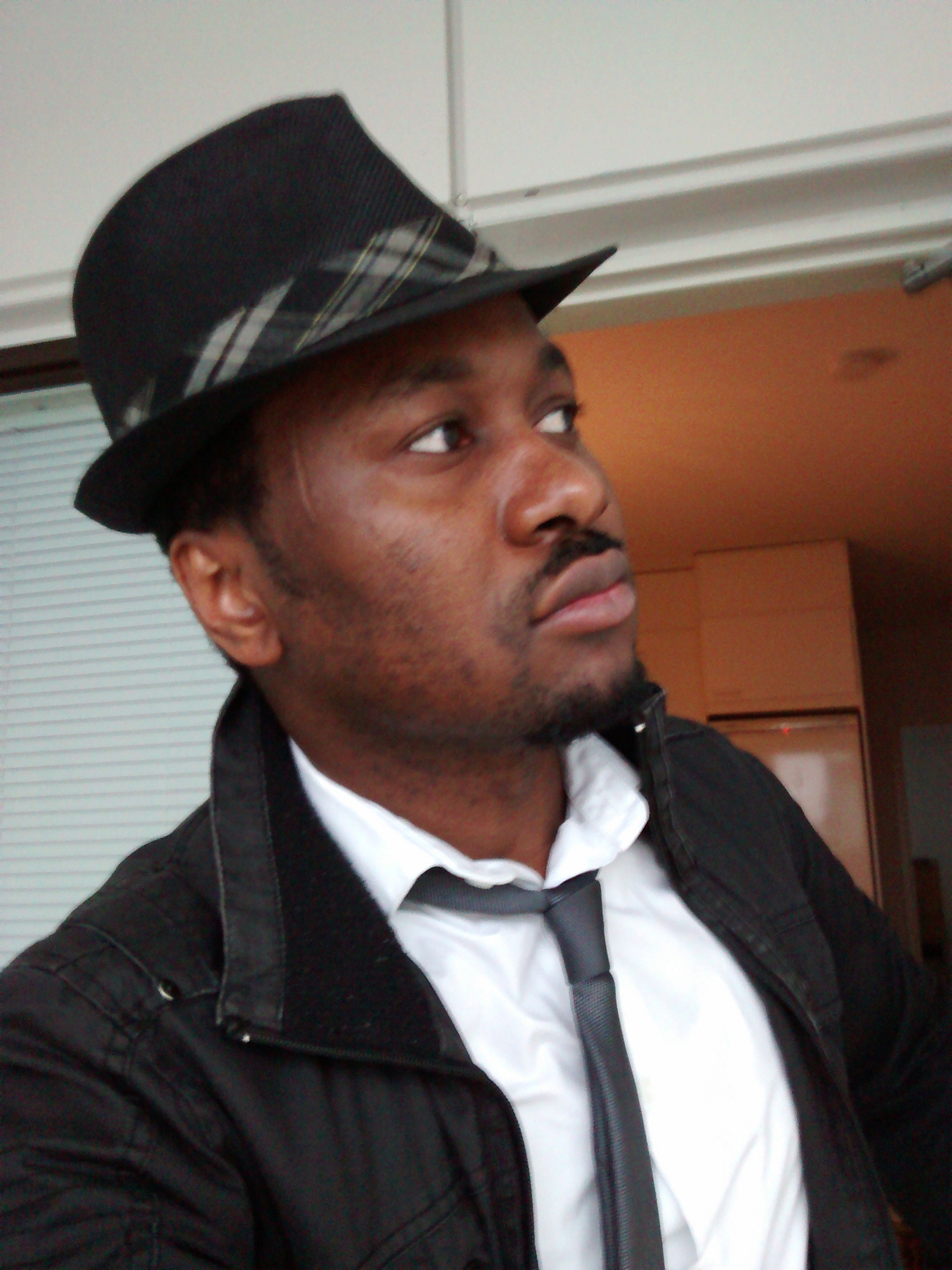

Background information
- Birth name: Michael Chika Ekeghasi
- Also known as: ME
- Born: 14 February 1985 (age 40); Lagos, Nigeria
- Genres: Reggae, Pop, Soul
- Occupation(s): Singer, songwriter
- Instrument(s): Guitar, percussion
- Years active: 2014–present
- Website: www.michaelekeghasi.com

Michael Ekeghasi (born 14 February 1985) also known as "ME" is a Finland-based Nigerian singer and songwriter. Michael first gained popularity in 2016 for his cover of the Finnish rock band Eppu Normaali, titled "Joka päivä ja jokaikinen yö" which became a hit on Facebook and was featured on Soundi.fi, the website for Finland's largest music magazine. He was also a contestant on season 6 of The Voice of Finland (2017) where he reached the knockout stage of the competition.

== Early life ==
Born in the rural area of Lagos (Nigeria), Ekeghasi is the fourth child of his parents and has six brothers. He developed interest in music since the early age of 10. learning to play instrument like flute, harmonica and percussion all by himself without any formal training. He also sang in the choir at the local church in his city. At age 16, he had his first studio recording experience as a back-up vocalist. Growing up in a society where there is not much regards for music as a career, he was discouraged by family members and friends from following his passion.

== Education ==
He later studied Electromechanics at the Institute for Industrial Technology, Lagos, and worked for a while before moving to Finland in 2010 to further his studies. In 2013, he graduated with a Bachelor of Engineering (BEng) in automation engineering from HAMK University of Applied Sciences.

== Career ==
While studying in Finland, he played percussion and sang at the local church band during his spare time. He was a member of a multi-genre band in Valkeakoski which converted Finnish traditional Christmas songs into modern contemporary songs and performed them at the annual event, Grooveimmat Joululaulut. He was also member of the now defunct band called Love Nation.

In late 2014, Ekeghasi decided go back to his passion and starts a career in Music. He started posting covers of songs by famous Finnish singers and of other popular music artiste on Facebook and YouTube and also performing at the local gigs and bars around town. In September 2016, his cover of the song Joka päivä ja jokaikinen yö by the Finnish rock band Eppu Normaali immediately became a hit on Facebook with thousands of views. This was partly due to his lively and sunny rendition of the song. He went on to release other hit cover songs on Facebook like J.Karjalainen’s Vileja Lupiineja and Hector's Mandoliinimies among others.

== Popular Finnish media appearance ==
=== Yle ===
On 24 September 2016, Ekeghasi appeared on the Finnish national television, Yle, during the Peli Poikki anti-racism rally held in Helsinki, where he performed as a guest artist. The rally had in attendance over 15,000 people among which the former president of Finland, Tarja Halonen, Paleface, Malang Cissokho and Helsinki Philharmonic Orchestra.

=== Soundi ===
In September 2016, Ekeghasi was featured on Soundi.fi, the website for the largest music magazine in Finland.

=== Ruutu ===
On 27 January 2017, Ekeghasi appeared on Ruutu.fi in an interview with Tiini Wikström of Loop FM, In the interview, Ekeghasi explained what led to his covering of the Eppu Normaali song "Joka paivaa ja joka ikinen yö".

== The Voice of Finland, (2017) ==
In January 2017, Ekeghasi's blind audition on The Voice of Finland season 6 was aired on channel 4, Nelonen TV. He performed "One Love/People Get Ready" by the legendary reggae music icon Bob Marley. Three of the Judges, Redrama, Anna Puu and Michael Monroe turned their chairs. These reactions of these judges earned him a place in the battle rounds of the competition as he picked Redrama as his choice coach.

His battle performance was broadcast in February 2017, Ekeghasi performed "Can't stop the feeling" by Justin Timberlake, alongside Terry Kim, another contestant from South Korea. Ekeghasi was selected as the winner of that round and move on to the next rounds, the Knockouts.

At the knockout rounds, which was aired in March 2017, Ekeghasi performed his famous cover of Eppu Normaali's song, Joka päivää ja joka ikinen yö. His performance was well received by the audience with positive feedback from the judges. Michael Monroe, one of the judges, said he loves the contrast of having a Nigerian perform a Finnish song in a unique way. Ekeghasi was asked to take the second seat by his coach Redrama.
