= Reflection (Redrama album) =

2014 studio album by Redrama

Studio album by Redrama
- Released: February 28, 2014
- Genre: Hip hop, pop
- Length: 44:06
- Label: Sony Music

Redrama chronology
Pakkå ruåtsi (2011)	Reflection (2014)

Singles from Reflection
- 1. "Kickstart" Released: February 2012; 2. "Dumb!" Released: November 2012; 3. "Clouds" Released: May 2013; 4. "Let Go" Released: January 2014

Reflection is the fourth studio album by Finnish rapper Redrama. It was released by Sony Music as a digital download on February 28, 2014. The album contains three hit singles: "Kickstart", "Clouds" (featuring AJ McLean) and "Let Go" (featuring Kristinia DeBarge), all reaching the top 5 of the Finnish music charts.

== Track listing ==
No.	Title	Music	Length
1.	"Now"	Redrama, Henri Lanz	3:39
2.	"Got This"	Redrama	4:11
3.	"Kickstart"	Redrama, Henri Lanz	3:44
4.	"Angel"	Redrama, Henri Lanz	3:50
5.	"Clouds" (feat. AJ McLean)	Redrama, Henri Lanz	3:52
6.	"Devil"	Redrama, Henri Lanz	3:33
7.	"Real" (feat. Lazee)	Redrama, Henri Lanz, Mawuli Kulego	3:43
8.	"Flight Mode"	Redrama, Henri Lanz, J. Olsson	2:49
9.	"Let Go" (feat. Kristinia DeBarge)	Redrama, Henri Lanz	4:07
10.	"Dumb!"	Redrama, Henri Lanz	3:34
11.	"Awake"	Redrama	3:51
12.	"Turn Around"	Redrama	3:13
Total length:			44 min
