= Jussi Hakulinen =

Finnish musical artist (1964–2022)

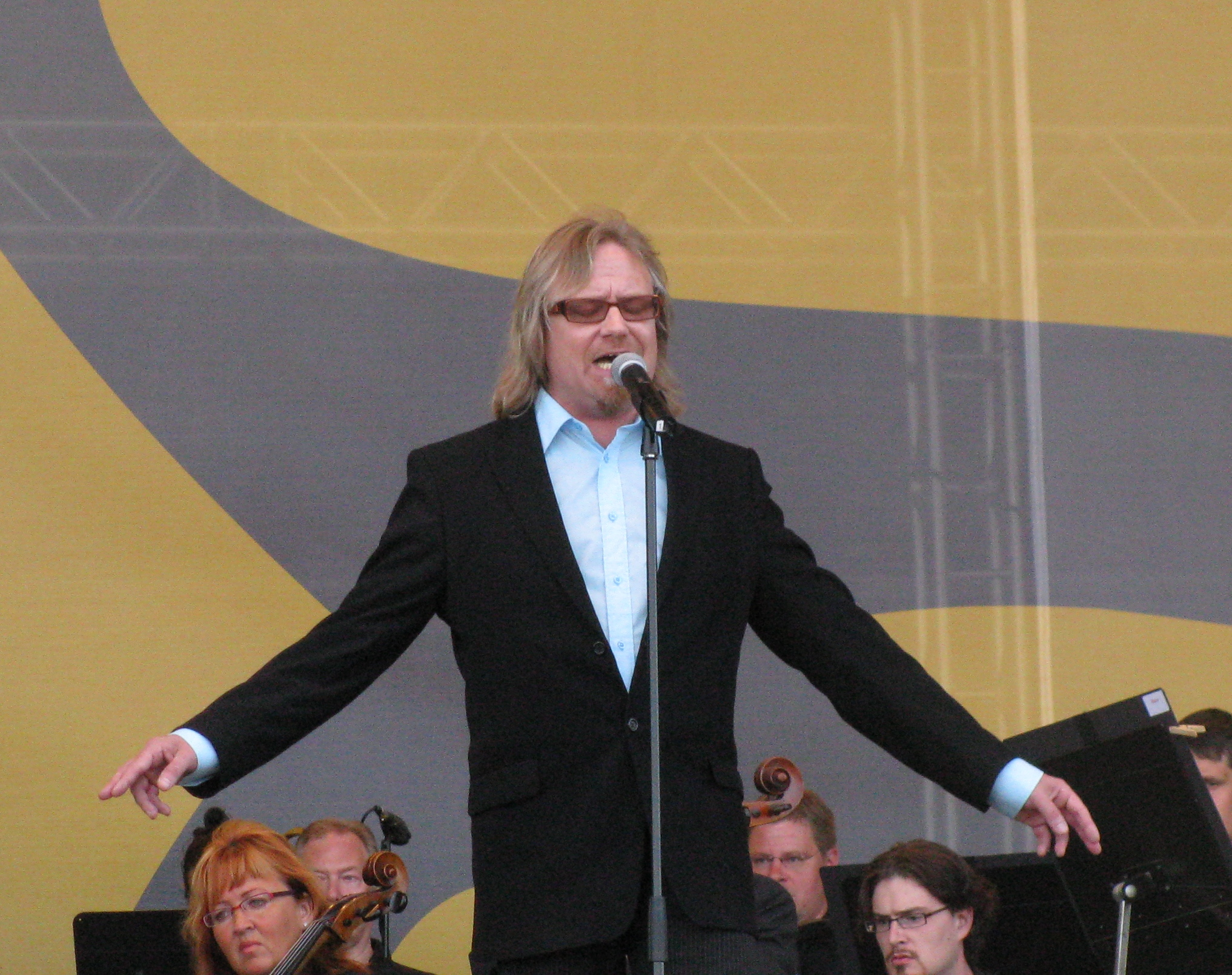
- Hakulinen in 2008

Background information
- Born: 21 December 1964; Pori, Finland
- Died: 9 August 2022 (aged 57); Pori, Finland
- Genres: Rock, pop
- Occupation(s): Singer, songwriter, musician
- Instrument(s): Vocals, guitar, keyboards
- Years active: 1981–2022
- Formerly of: Yö

Jussi Pekka Hakulinen (21 December 1964 – 9 August 2022) was a Finnish musician and singer-songwriter. He was one of the original members of the group Yö, one of the best-selling rock bands in Finland. Hakulinen left the band for solo career in 1985 after two platinum selling albums. Since 1990, Hakulinen was an occasional visitor to Yö's concerts and also wrote material for the band. His songs Joutsenlaulu (1984) and Rakkaus on lumivalkoinen (2003), recorded by Yö, have been voted as the greatest Finnish pop songs in several listeners polls.

== Discography ==
=== Yö ===
- Varietee (1983)
- Nuorallatanssija (1984)

=== Kinsky ===
- Valtaa ja voimaa (1986)

=== Solo ===
- Vaaleanpunainen majatalo (1985)
- Pennitön Onassis (1991)
- Vieraskirja (1995)
- 3.33.33 (1998)
- Tähtipölyä (2010)
