= Yö =

Finnish rock band

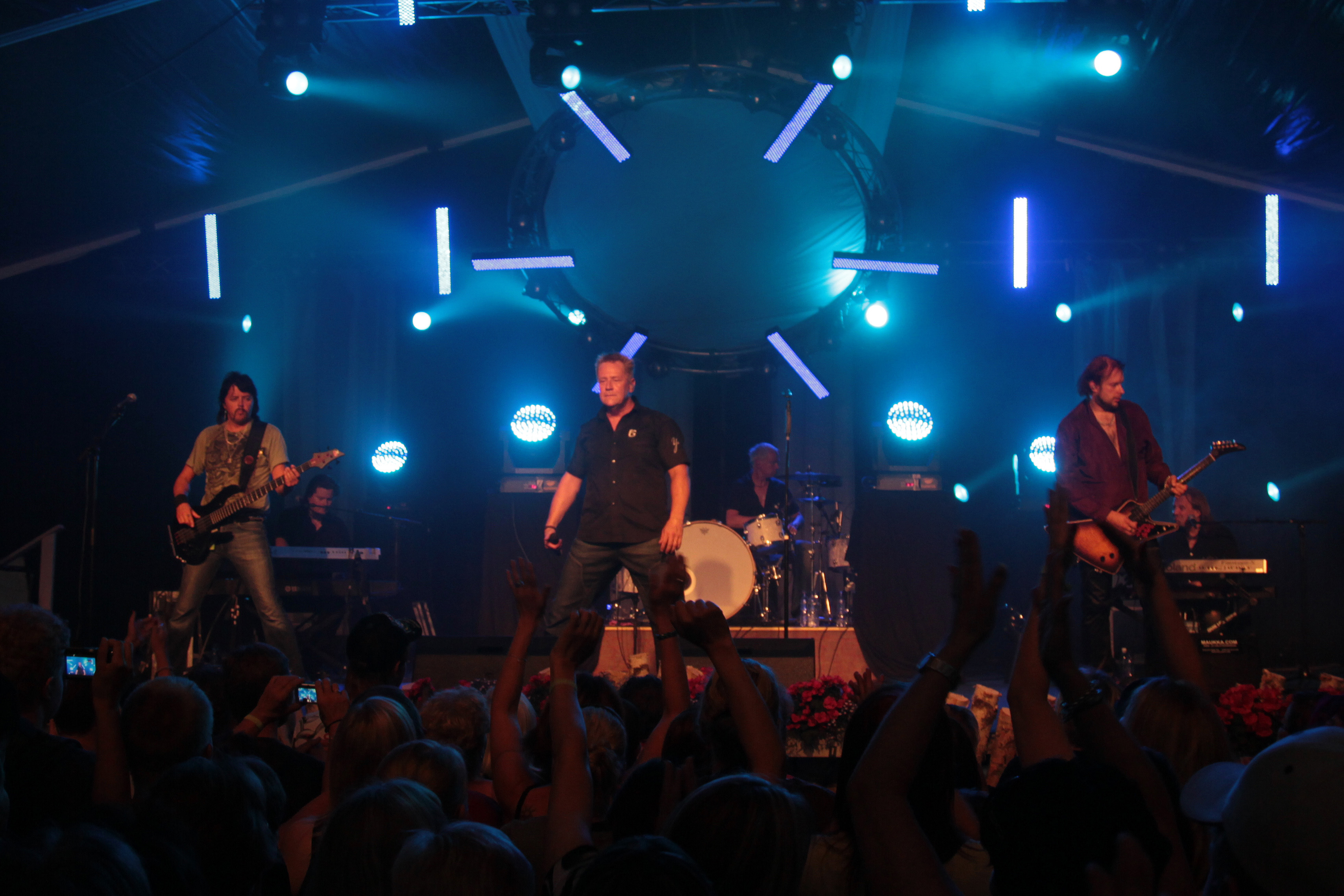
- Yö in 2010

Background information
- Origin: Pori, Finland
- Genres: Finnish rock, rock
- Years active: 1981–2019
- Past members: Olli Lindholm (deceased); Jussi Hakulinen (deceased); Jesu Hämäläinen; Veikko Lehtiranta; Juha Mielonen; Antti Mäkinen; Jukka Mänty-Sorvari; Markku Petander; Juha Rauäng; Jukka Lewis; Daffy Terävä; Mikko Kangasjärvi; Ari Toikka; Jari Latomaa; Harri Varhala; Jani Viitanen; Tapio Wallin
- Website: Likaisetlegendat.com

Yö (English: night) is a Finnish rock band, formed in 1981 in Pori.

The band has had many line-up changes during their history, and almost 20 different musicians play or have played with the band. Yö's first line-up included singer Olli Lindholm and composer, singer and keyboardist Jussi Hakulinen, guitarist Jani Viitanen, bassist Juha Rauäng and drummer Harri Varhala. Since the late 1980s band has been more or less based in Tampere.

Yö's biggest hits include songs like Joutsenlaulu (Swansong), Likaiset legendat (Dirty Legends), Ihmisen poika (Son of a Human), Rakkaus on lumivalkoinen (Love is Snow-White), Särkynyt enkeli (Broken Angel), and Tia-Maria (a Finnish woman's name). The group started with punk rock influenced music but later moved towards mainstream rock. Yö is Finland's 10th best-selling music artist of all time with two multi-platinum, two double-platinum, six platinum and five gold records.

After singer and bandleader Olli Lindholm's sudden death in February 2019, and that of Jussi Hakulinen in 2022, it became doubtful as to whether the band would continue playing.

== Discography ==
=== Studio albums ===
- Varietee (Variety Show) (1983)
- Nuorallatanssija (Ropedancer) (1984)
- Myrskyn jälkeen (After the Storm) (1985)
- Äänet (Voices) (1986)
- Lanka palaa (Fire in the Hole) (1988)
- Toinen puoliaika (Second Act) (1989)
- Antaa soittaa (Let it Play) (1991)
- Tänä yönä (Tonight) (1992)
- Kymmenes kevät (Tenth Spring) (1993)
- Hyviä vuosia (Good Years) (1994)
- Satelliitti (Satellite) (1996)
- Pirstaleet (Shards) (1997)
- 13. Yö (13th Night) (1999)
- Valo (Light) (2000)
- Rakkaus on lumivalkoinen (Love is White as Snow) (2003)
- Kuolematon (Immortal) (2005)
- Valtakunta (Kingdom) (2007)
- Loisto (Shine) (2009)
- Pelko ja rakkaus (Fear and Love) (2012)
- Hyvässä ja pahassa (For Better or for Worse) (2014)
- Puolet taivaasta – puolet helvetistä (Half of Heaven – Half of Hell) (2016)
- Hyvän yön lauluja (2017)
- Mitä jos mä rakastan (2018)

=== Compilations ===
- Poko-klassikko (1987)
- Suurimmat hitit (1988)
- Parhaat (1995)
- Yön pimeä puoli (1998)
- Legenda (2001)
- Yön valoisa puoli (2006)
- Kiitos ja kunnia - 30v. juhlakokoelma (2011)
- Aikamatka 1981–2016 (2016)

=== Live albums ===
- ...Ja tapahtui niinä päivinä (1984)
- Täältä tulee Yö (1993)
- Yön 20-vuotisjuhlakonsertti (2002, DVD)
- Yhden Yön tarinoita (2003)
- Kolmen illan varietee (2006, CD/DVD)
- Yön ensimmäinen keikka (2008, LP)

== Members ==
Yö's members
Original (1981)	Olli Lindholm – vocals; Jani Viitanen – guitar; Juha Rauäng – bass; Jussi Hakulinen – vocals, keyboards; Harri Varhala – drums
(1981–1982)	Olli Lindholm – vocals; Jani Viitanen – guitar; Juha Rauäng – bass; Jussi Hakulinen – vocals, keyboards; Tapio Wallin – drums
(1982–1985)	Olli Lindholm – vocals; Jani Viitanen – guitar; Juha Rauäng – bass; Jussi Hakulinen – vocals, keyboards; Veikko Lehtiranta – drums
(1985–1987)	Olli Lindholm – vocals; Jani Viitanen – guitar; Markku Petander – guitar; Juha Rauäng – bass; Veikko Lehtiranta – drums
(1987–1990)	Olli Lindholm – vocals; Jani Viitanen – guitar; Juha Mielonen – guitar; Juha Rauäng – bass; Veikko Lehtiranta – drums
(1990–1992)	Olli Lindholm – vocals; Jani Viitanen – guitar; Jesu Hämäläinen – bass; Mikko Kangasjärvi – keyboards; Frogley – drums
(1992–1996)	Olli Lindholm – vocals; Jani Viitanen – guitar; Jesu Hämäläinen – bass; Frogley – drums
(1996–1999)	Olli Lindholm – vocals; Jani Viitanen – guitar; Markku Petander – guitar; Jesu Hämäläinen – bass; Frogley – drums
(1999–2000)	Olli Lindholm – vocals; Jani Viitanen – guitar; Markku Petander – guitar; Jay Lewis – bass; Frogley – drums
(2000)	Olli Lindholm – vocals; Markku Petander – guitar; Jay Lewis – bass; Frogley – drums
(2000–2002)	Olli Lindholm – vocals; Daffy Terävä – guitar; Jay Lewis – bass; Mikko Kangasjärvi – keyboards; Frogley – drums
(2002–2007)	Olli Lindholm – vocals; Daffy Terävä – guitar; Jay Lewis – bass; Mikko Kangasjärvi – keyboards; Antti Mäkinen – drums
(2007–2010)	Olli Lindholm – vocals; Daffy Terävä – guitar; Jay Lewis – bass; Mikko Kangasjärvi – keyboards; Ari Toikka – drums
(2010–2016)	Olli Lindholm – vocals; Daffy Terävä – guitar; Jay Lewis – bass; Mikko Kangasjärvi – keyboards; Jari Latomaa – keyboards; Ari Toikka – drums
(2017–2019)	Olli Lindholm – vocals; Jussi Turpeinen – guitar; Timo Mynttinen – bass; Mikko Kangasjärvi – keyboards; Jari Latomaa – keyboards; Ari Toikka – drums

=== Past members ===
- Olli Lindholm – vocals (1981–2019)
- Jussi Hakulinen – keyboard & vocals (1981–1985) (died 2022)
- Jani Viitanen – guitar (1981–2000)
- Juha Rauäng – bass (1981–1990)
- Harri Varhala – drums (early 1981)
- Tapio Wallin – drums (late 1981)
- Veikko ”Veke” Lehtiranta – drums (1982–1990)
- Jussi Turpeinen – guitar (2017–2019)
- Timo Mynttinen – bass (2017–2019)
- Mikko Kangasjärvi – keyboard & accordion (years 1990–1992, and again 2000–2019)
- Jari Latomaa – keyboard & pipe organ (2010–2019)
- Ari Toikka – drums & percussion (2007–2019)
- Markku Petander – guitar (1985–1987 ja 1996–2000)
- Juha Mielonen – guitar (1987–1990)
- Jesu Hämäläinen – bass (1990–1999)
- Jukka ”Frogley” Mänty-Sorvari – drums (1990–2002)
- Jukka Lewis – bass guitar (1999–2016)
- Daffy Terävä – guitar (2000–2016)
- Antti Mäkinen – drums & percussion (2002–2006)

== See also ==
- List of best-selling music artists in Finland
