= Iara Vargas =

Brazilian philosopher and politician

State Deputy of Rio de Janeiro
- In office February 1, 1983 – 31 January 1987

State Deputy of Guanabara
- In office 1967–1969

Personal details
- Born: October 29, 1921 São Borja, Rio Grande do Sul, Brazil
- Died: March 16, 2007 (aged 85) Rio de Janeiro, Rio de Janeiro, Brazil
- Party: PDT
- Other political affiliations: PTB

Iara Lopes Vargas (October 29, 1921 - March 16, 2007) was a Brazilian philosopher and politician. She was one of the founders of the Democratic Labour Party (PDT) and state deputy of Guanabara and of Rio de Janeiro.

Besides, she was niece of Getúlio Vargas.
