= Petrilaca =

Petrilaca Péterlaka-patak
- Location within Romania

Location
- Country: Romania
- Counties: Mureș County
- Villages: Petrilaca de Mureș

Physical characteristics
- Mouth: Mureș
  - location: Periș
  - coordinates: 46.6899°N 24.6468°E
- Length: 15 km (9.3 mi)
- Basin size: 52 km^{2} (20 sq mi)

Basin features
- Progression: Mureș→ Tisza→ Danube→ Black Sea
- Tributaries
  - left: Iara

The Petrilaca (Hungarian: Péterlaka-patak, meaning "Peter's Place Creek") is a left tributary of the river Mureș in Transylvania, Romania. It discharges into the Mureș near Gornești. Its length is 15 km (9.3 mi) and its basin size is 52 km^{2} (20 sq mi).
