= Anna Puu =

Finnish pop singer (born 1982)

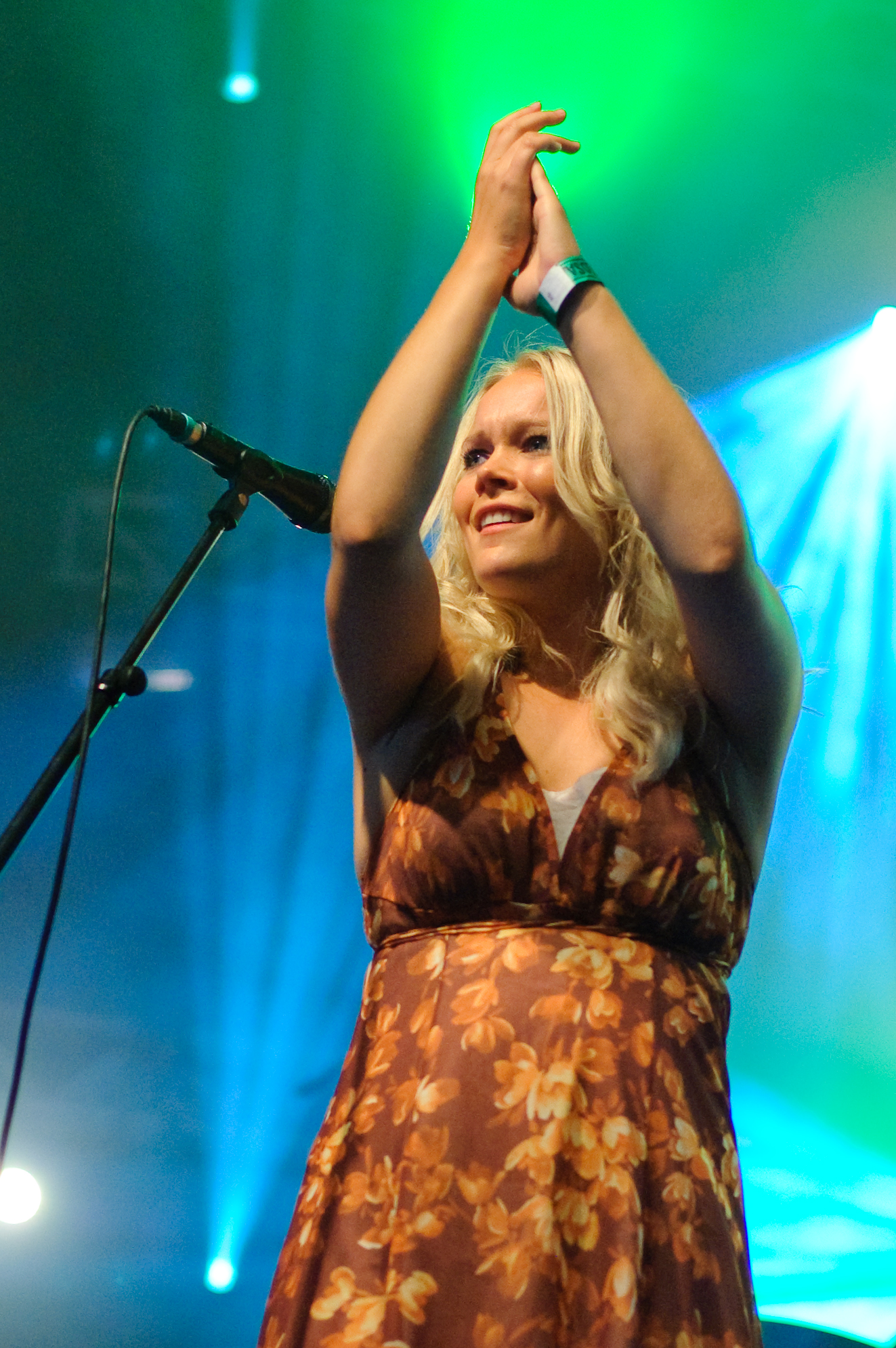
- Anna Puu performing in 2009

Background information
- Born: February 3, 1982 (age 44); Outokumpu, Finland
- Years active: 2008 – present

Anna Puu (born Anna Puustjärvi; February 3, 1982) is a Finnish singer-songwriter. She placed second in Finland's Idols 2008 competition.

Puu's first album, Anna Puu, was released on April 29, 2009, and reached #1. The first single, "C'est la vie", was released in mid-April and reached #1 in Finland. Another single, "Kaunis päivä", reached #6 on the Finnish charts, but the last single "Melankolian riemut" failed to make an impact on the charts. The album has since sold over 60,000 copies.

Puu released a second album, Sahara, on May 26, 2010, and it also reached #1. The singles "Riko minut" and "Sinä olet minä" failed to chart. Her third album, Antaudun, was released on October 26, 2012, and reached #2. "Kolme pientä sanaa", the first single, failed to chart.

== Discography ==
=== Albums ===
Year	Album	Peak positions	Certification
Year	Album	FIN	Certification
2009	Anna Puu	1	
2010	Sahara	1	
2012	Antaudun	2	
2015	Rakkaudella	10	
2016	Melankolian riemut 2009–2015	35	
2018	Nälkäinen sydän	1	

=== Singles ===
Year	Album	Peak positions	Album
Year	Album	FIN	Album
2009	"C'est la vie"	1	Anna Puu
2009	"Kaunis päivä"	6	Anna Puu
2013	"Säännöt Rakkaudelle"	11	Antaudun
2016	"Suudellaan"	6	
2016	"Kovaa"	16	
2018	"Me ollaan runo"	14	
2018	"Keho puhuu"	14	
2020	"2020" (with Olavi Uusivirta)	9	
2023	"Rakkaus tappaa"	46	
