= Logomo =

Cultural centre and event venue in Turku, Finland

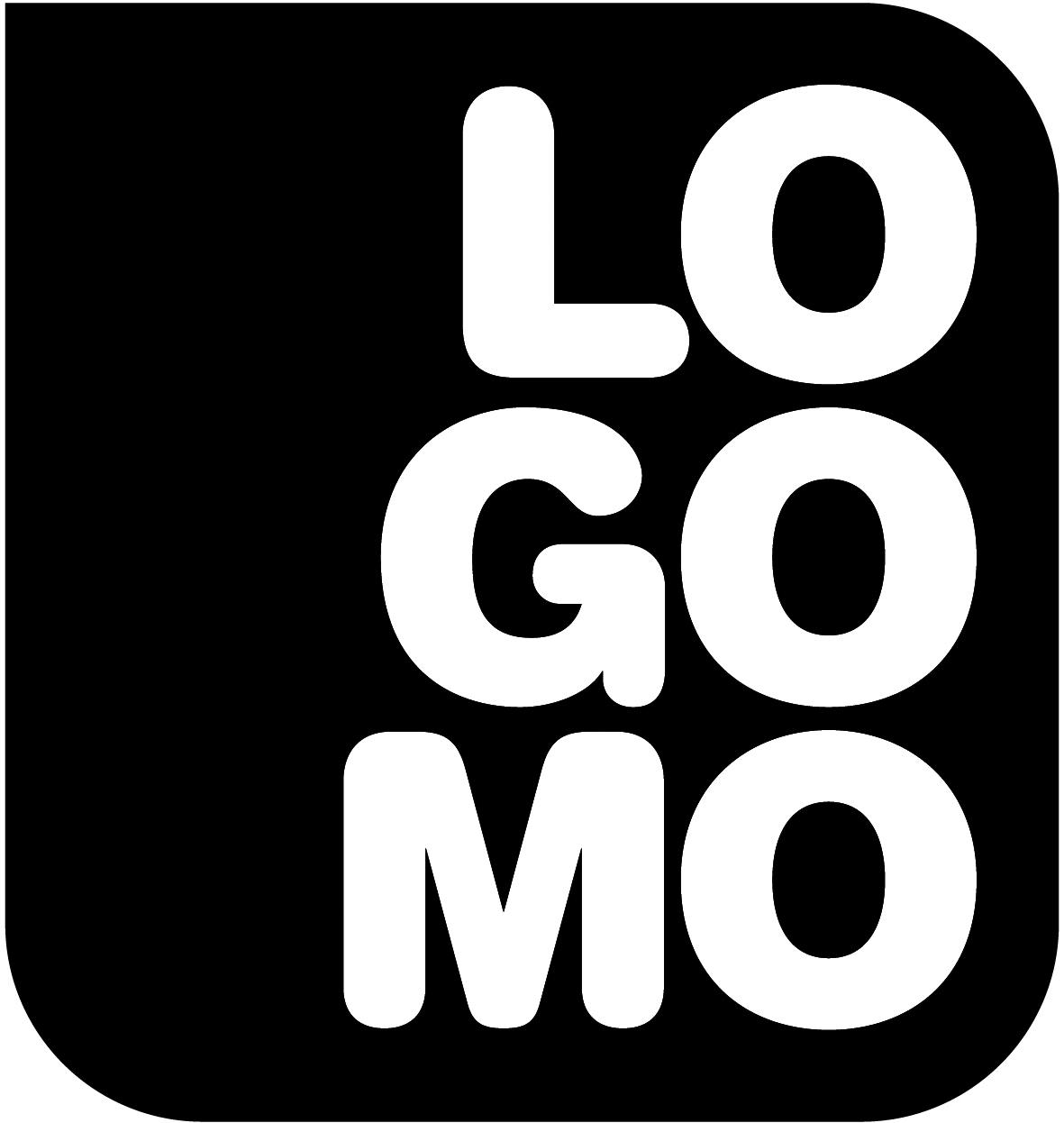

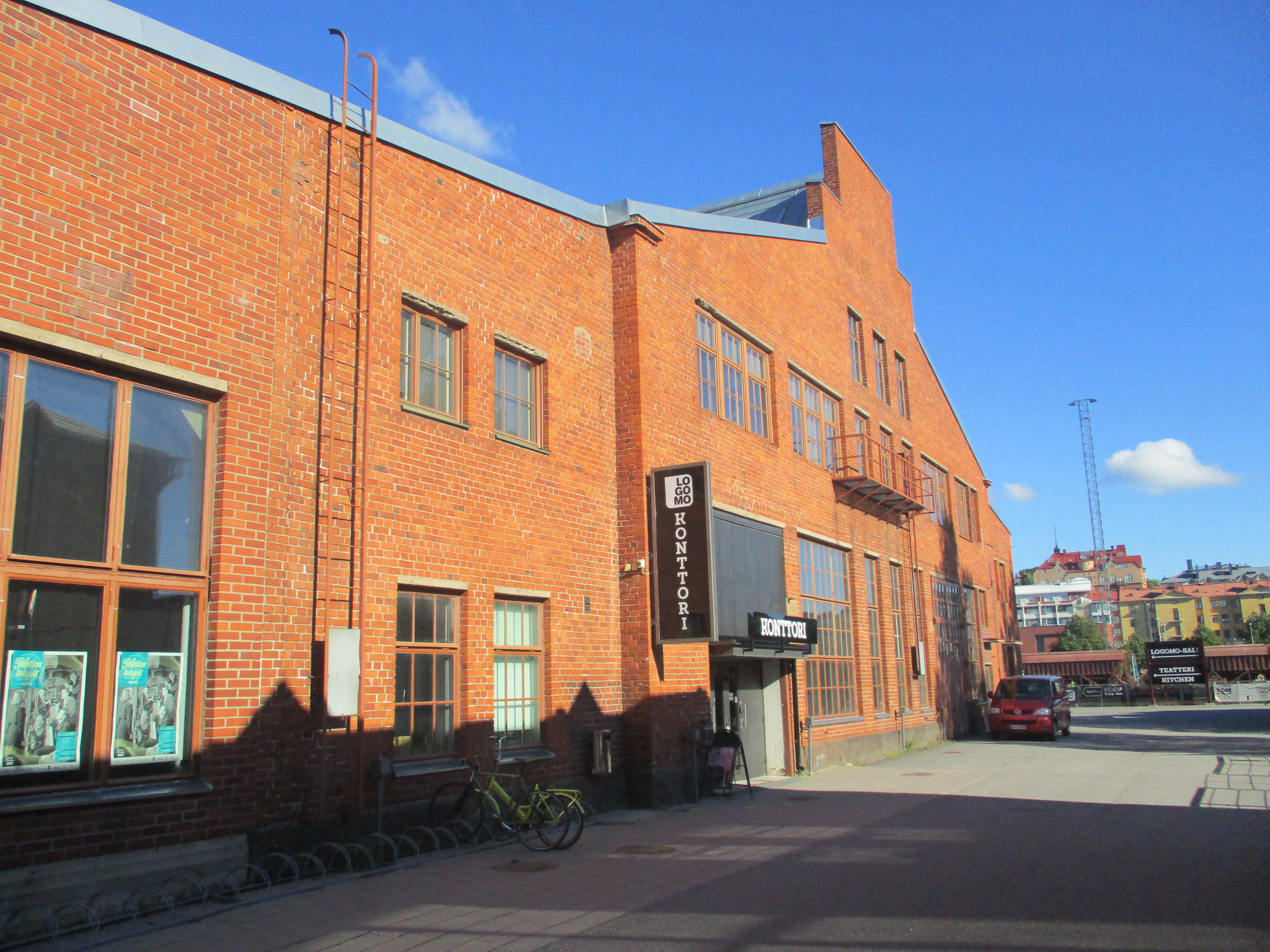
- Logomo office premises in 2017
- Interactive map of the Logomo area

General information
- Location: Turku, Finland, Köydenpunojankatu 14
- Coordinates: 60°27′25″N 22°15′27″E
- Completed: 2011 (original building in 1876)
- Owner: Logomo Oy (Hartela Oy 61% and City of Turku 31%)

Technical details
- Floor area: 24,000 square meters

Logomo is an old VR machine shop and a current cultural venue in Turku in close proximity to the Turku railway station. The building was opened in 2011 as a part of the Turku European Capital of Culture festivities.

The building includes galleries, stages, a restaurant, as well as working spaces for businesses and artists. The Logomo centre, Byrå and Konttori facilities house more than 400 working employees and over 70 companies.

== History ==
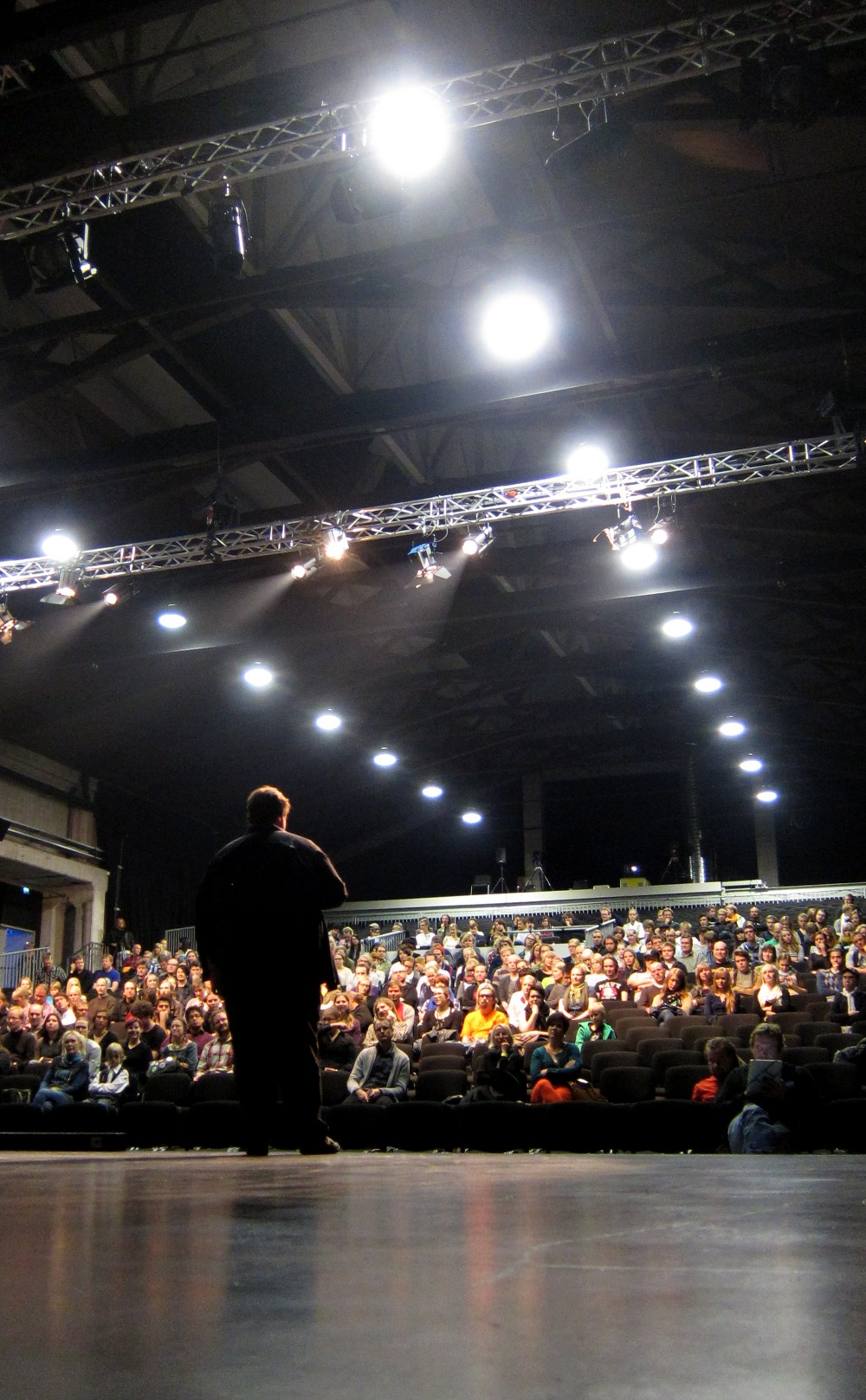
One of the stages at Logomo

The oldest part of the building was built in 1876 as a machine shop for the state railway monopoly VR. Since then, it has been expanded several times and in 2011 it was renovated to function as the main venue for the Turku European Capital of Culture festivities. The opening exhibitions were: "Alice in Wonderland" photographic display, Tom of Finland retrospective, "Only a game?" football themed exhibition by UEFA, video installations by Eija-Liisa Ahtila and Isaac Julien, and an exhibition on fire by Heureka "Fire!Fire!".

== Events ==
Logomo hosts a variety of conferences, concerts and other events. Currently, Logomo hosts the Turku City Theatre as their own building is undergoing renovations until the autumn of 2017.

Logomo has also served as the location of television series such as: The Voice of Finland, The Voice Kids, and Finland's national selection process for the Eurovision Song Contest, Uuden Musiikin Kilpailu, in 2019, 2022 and 2023.

In 2016 Logomo housed over 1000 different events, with more than 369,000 visitors passing through its doors. The number of visitors has been growing consecutively for five years now.
