= Olli Lindholm =

Finnish singer and guitarist (1964–2019)

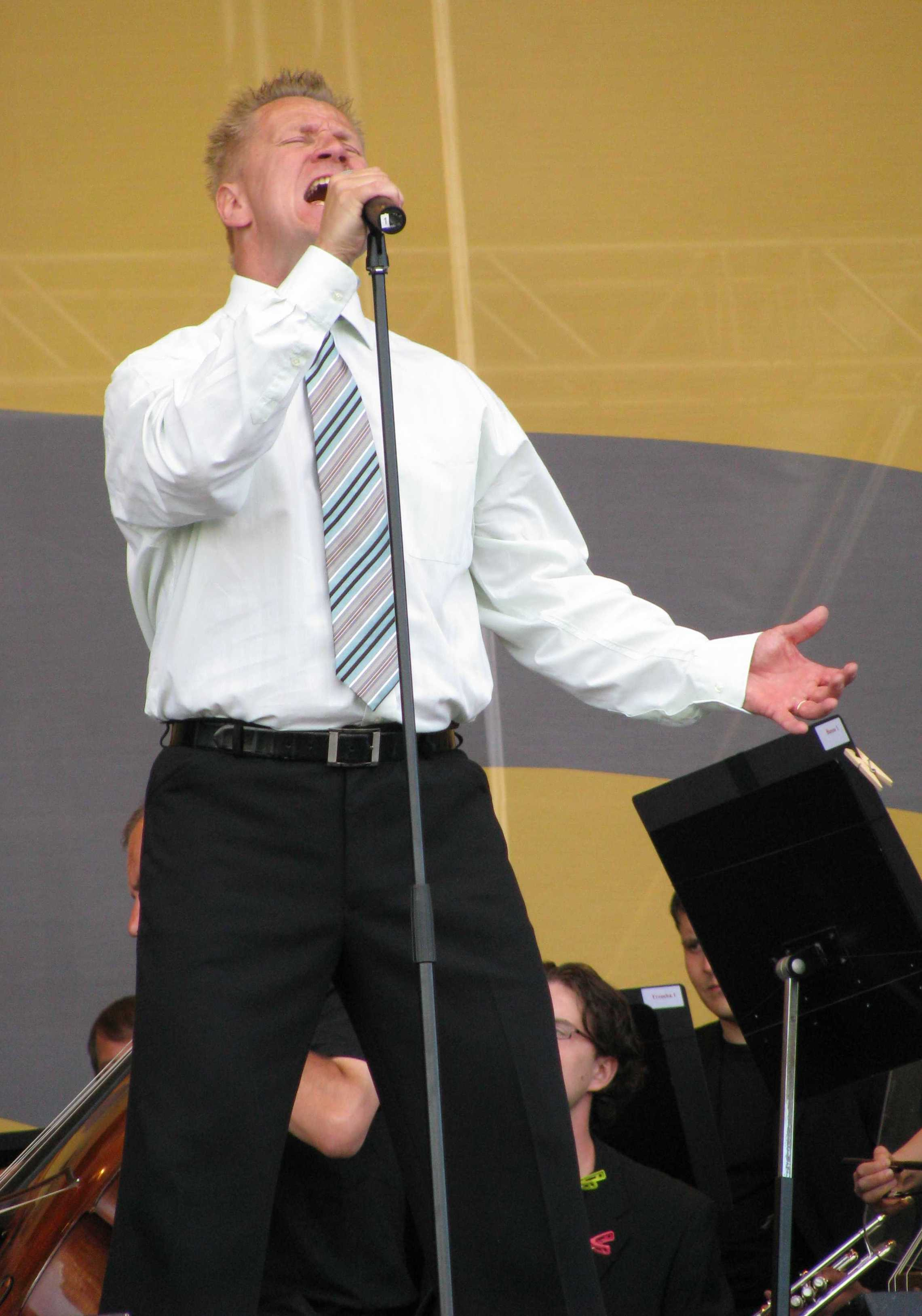
- Lindholm in 2008

Background information
- Born: 19 March 1964; Pori, Finland
- Died: 12 February 2019 (aged 54) Tampere, Finland
- Genres: Finnish rock
- Occupations: Singer, guitarist
- Instruments: Vocals, guitar
- Years active: 1981–2019
- Formerly of: Appendix (1982); Yö (1981–2019)
- Website: www.ollilindholm.fi

Olli Lindholm (19 March 1964 – 12 February 2019) was a Finnish singer and guitarist. He was the lead singer of the renowned Finnish band Yö since the early 1980s with a string of hits and albums. In addition, he worked on a solo basis with his own four albums released on various labels including Maailma on kaunis in 2010 that peaked at number one on The Official Finnish Chart Suomen virallinen lista.

== Career ==
Olli Lindholm was a founding member of the Finnish rock band Yö. The band was formed in 1981. During his decades long participation in Yö, members of the band had drastically changed, as he was eventually the only original member left.

Lindholm's career in music had started from punk rock at the age of 16. He participated in multiple bands during the early years of his career. For instance, he started with another Finnish punk band Appendix in 1982 as a founding member and vocalist and guitarist.

He was awarded the Iskelmä-Finlandia "Best Finnish singer" award in 2008.

He served as a guest judge during the auditions to the Finnish Idol series in 2011.

A biography of his life was written in 2017.

He also served as a judge in The Voice of Finland, at the time of his death in 2019.

== Personal life ==
Lindholm had two children from a marriage that had ended in a divorce. He lived in the city of Tampere.

In February 2019, Lindholm suddenly died following an aortic rupture.

== Discography ==
(For Olli Lindholm discography with Yö, refer to the band's discography section)

=== Albums ===
Solo albums

Year	Album	Peak positions
Year	Album	FIN
2000	Voima	30
2010	Maailma on kaunis	1
2012	Nukku-matti ja herra kuu (with Susanna Hietala)	14
2013	Minun jouluni	6
