= Redrama =

Finnish rapper

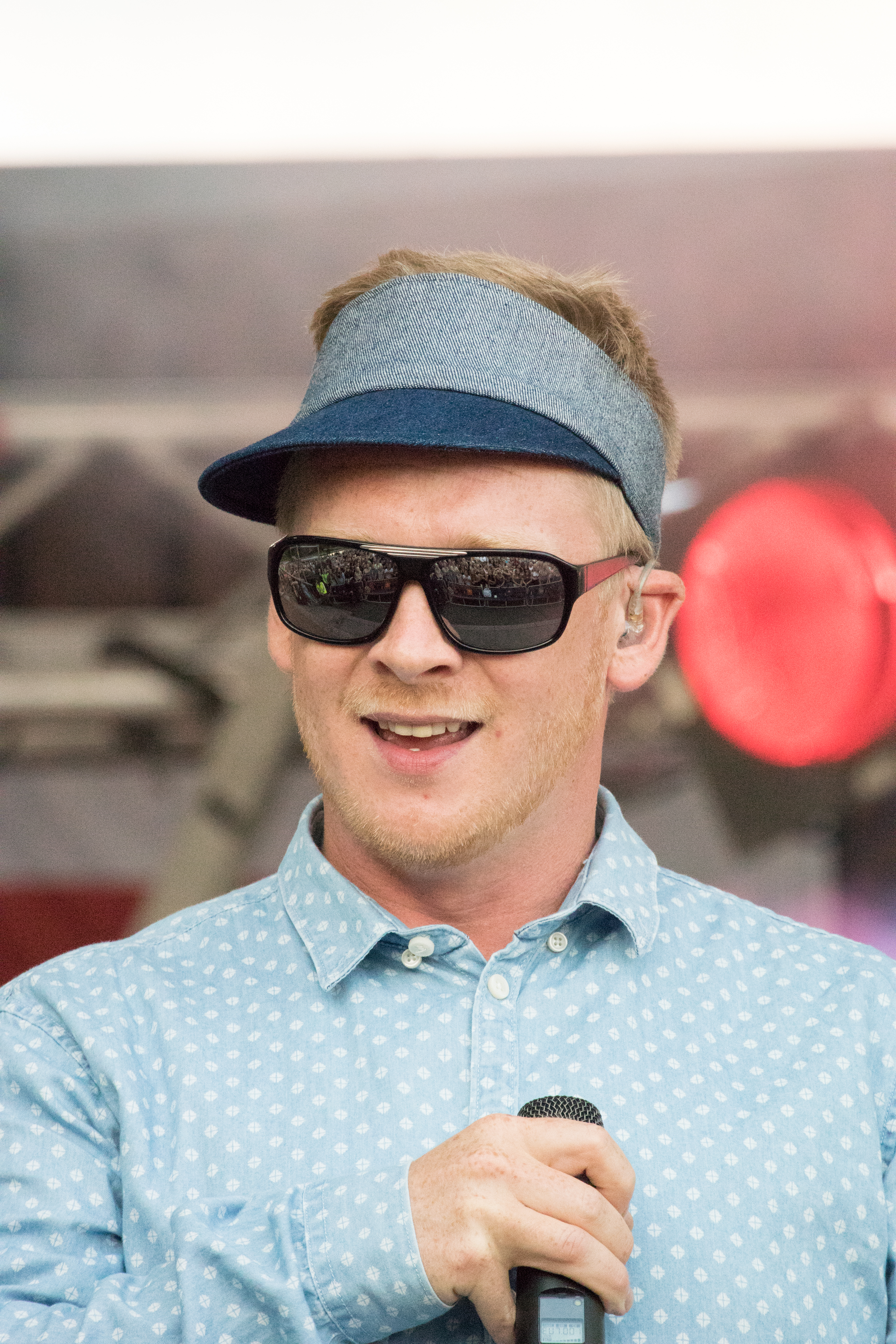

Background information
- Also known as: Redrama
- Born: Lasse Mellberg; 2 October 1977 (age 49); Helsinki, Finland
- Origin: Finland
- Genre: Hip hop
- Occupations: Rapper; singer
- Years active: 2001–present
- Labels: Virgin; Rähinä

Lasse Mellberg (born 2 October 1977), better known by his stage name Redrama, is a Finnish rapper. He made a breakthrough in 2003. Redrama, who performs primarily in English, but also in Swedish and Finnish was part of a hip-hop group Alien Allies which also included the Norwegian Paperboys and Madcon. Redrama won the English-language Finnish championship of rapping in 2001 and he also won the Finnish Grammy (Emma) award for The Best Hip Hop Album in 2005.

His first EP, Redrama EP, was released in 2001. The EP included seven tracks and it was released by Incredible Productions. In 2002, Redrama signed a recording contract with Virgin UK and his debut album, Everyday Soundtrack, was released in 2003. His second studio album, Street Music, was released two years later.

In 2005, Redrama won an EBBA Award. European Border Breakers Awards is presented annually to ten emerging artists or groups who have reached audiences outside their own countries with their first internationally released album in the past year.

After winning the European Border Breakers Award, Redrama joined Gang Starr as a supporting artist on their European Tour. In 2007, Redrama recorded his first duet with another popular Finnish hip hop artist, Paleface. The single "Still In Charge" reached number 4 on the Finnish Single Charts and was the start to the collaboration between these two most successful English-speaking rappers in Finland. In 2008 and 2009, the collaboration expanded when Redrama and Paleface were joined by a reggae musician and singer CapeNape and Swedish hip hop artist Promoe of Looptroop Rockers. The four rappers toured around Finland under the name Conscious Youth. The group released one album in Finland.

Redrama's third studio album, The Getaway, was released in June 2009 by the most well-known hip hop label in Finland, Rähinä Records. The first single released from the album was "Music".

After a short stint as a Rähinä Records artist, Redrama established his own production company and label called Non-Genre.

In 2012, the news spread that Redrama was working in Amsterdam together with AJ McLean of Backstreet Boys. A new single release, "Clouds", featuring McLean, was released in May 2013. Despite the lack of large marketing campaigns, the news about the single were reported widely all over the world mainly through the Backstreet Boys fan websites and blogs. "Clouds" was the first single release for Redrama's studio album Reflection.

== Personal life ==
Redrama grew up in a Swedish-speaking Finnish family.

He follows a straight edge lifestyle and has been sober since 2010.

== Discography ==
=== Albums ===
Year	Album	Peak positions	Notes
Year	Album	FIN	Notes
2003	Everyday Soundtrack	8	Track list: 1. Hang It Up; 2. Knuckleheadz (feat. Critical); 3. If You with That; 4. Stand Strong; 5. A Day at a Time; 6. You; 7. This Is What It Sounds Like; 8. Babylon; 9. Everyday Soundtrack; 10. Kill It with Hip Hop; 11. Average Assholes (feat. Kapricon, Vinnie & Critical); 12. Raindrops
2005	Street Music	13	Track list: 1. Introduction; 2. Street Music; 3. I Don't Know What to Tell You; 4. Today Just Ain't the Day; 5. Off Your Chest; 6. Let Me Go; 7. I Can't Help Myself; 8. List of Things to Do; 9. Good Woman; 10. Blessed (feat. Elastinen); 11. Rest of Your Life; 12. Feet to Work
2009	The Getaway	23	Track list: 1. "Rise"; 2. "Piece of the Pie"; 3. "Music"; 4. "Those Days"; 5. "Move It Along"; 6. "For a Day"; 7. "Hold Me Back"; 8. "Slow Down"; 9. "Apologize"; 10. "Way You See It"; 11. "The Getaway"; 12. "Under-Estimators" (feat. Prop Dylan); 13. "Better Man"; 14. "Right Here"
2014	Reflection	8	Track list: 1. "Now"; 2. "Got This"; 3. "Kickstart"; 4. "Angel"; 5. "Clouds"; 6. "Devil"; 7. "Real" (feat. Lazee); 8. "Flight Mode"; 9. "Let Go" (explicit version); 10. "Dumb!"; 11. "Awake"; 12. "Turn Around"

=== EPs ===
- 2001: Redrama EP
- 2009: Samma på svenska
- 2011: Pakkå Ruåtsi (with Jesse P)

=== Mixtapes ===
- 2011: Cabin Fever Diaries Vol. 1

=== Singles ===
(charting)

Year	Single	Peak positions	Album
Year	Single	FIN	Album
2003	"If You with That"	–	Everyday Soundtrack
2003	"Hang It Up"	1	Everyday Soundtrack
2004	"Knuckleheadz"	18	Everyday Soundtrack
2005	"Street Music"	6	Street Music
2012	"Kickstart"	5	Reflection
2012	"Dumb!"	-	Reflection
2013	"Clouds" (feat. AJ McLean)	4	Reflection
2014	"Let Go" (feat. Kristinia DeBarge)	3	Reflection

Other releases

- 2005: "Rest of Your Life"
- 2005: "Don't Know What to Tell You"
- 2009: "Music"
- 2009: "Du"
- 2011: "Sail On"
- 2011: "F.R.E.E."
- 2011: "Måndag till söndag" (with Jesse P)
- 2012: "Gottabe"

Featured in

- 2011: "Worst Part Is Over" (Anna Abreu feat. Redrama)
- 2012: "Same Thing Different" (The Mood feat. Lazee & Redrama)
- 2012: "Lämpöö" (Brädi feat. Redrama)
- 2014: "Tuhatta" (Janne Ordén feat. Redrama)
