= The Voice of Finland season 2 =

The Voice of Finland
- Season 2
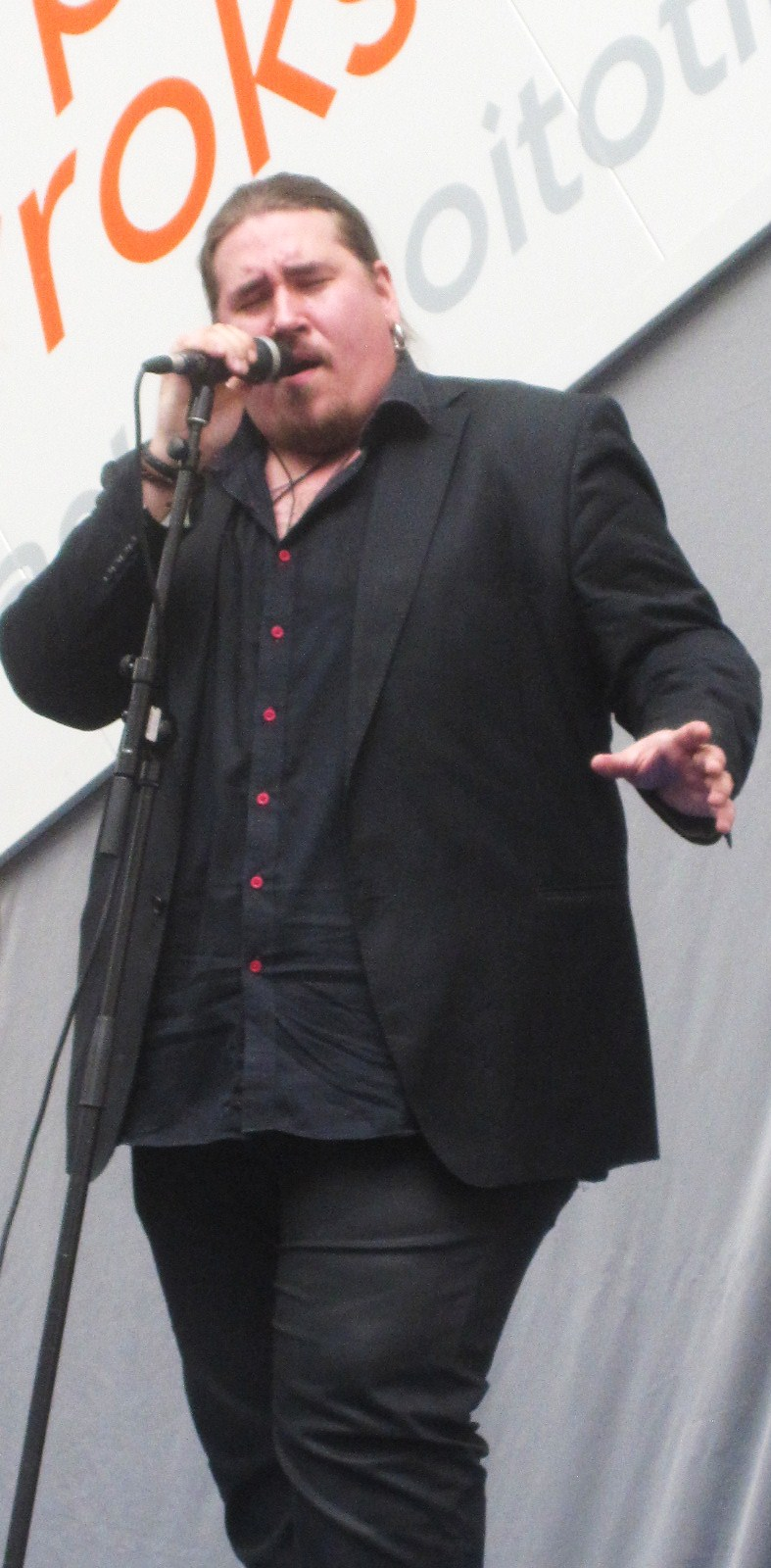
- Hosted by: Axl Smith (host), Tea Khalifa (social media reporter), Sebastian Rejman (backstage reporter)
- Judges: Elastinen; Lauri Tähkä; Paula Koivuniemi; Michael Monroe
- Winner: Antti Railio
- Winning coach: Paula Koivuniemi
- Runner-up: Emilia Ekström
- Finals venue: Logomo

Release
- Original network: Nelonen
- Original release: January 4 – April 26, 2013

Season chronology
- ← Previous; Season 1 Next → Season 3

The Voice of Finland (season 2) is the second season of the Finnish reality singing competition based on The Voice format. The season premiered on Nelonen on January 4, 2013.

The coaches are legendary singer Paula Koivuniemi, glam rock singer Michael Monroe, former Lauri Tähkä & Elonkerjuu frontman Lauri Tähkä, and rapper Elastinen. Axl Smith hosts the program.

The winner of the second season was Antti Railio, mentored by Paula Koivuniemi. The runner-up was Emilia Ekström.

== Overview ==
The series consists of three phases: a blind audition, a battle phase, and live performance shows. Four judges/coaches, all noteworthy recording artists, choose teams of contestants through a blind audition process where the coaches cannot see, but only hear the auditioner. Each judge has the length of the auditioner's performance (about one minute) to decide if they want that singer on their team; if two or more judges want the same singer (as happens frequently), the singer has the final choice of coach.

Each team of contestants is mentored and developed by its respective coach. In the second stage, called the battle phase, coaches have two of their team members battle against each other directly by singing the same song together, with the coach choosing which team member to advance from each of four individual "battles" into the first live round.

In the final phase, the remaining contestants (Final 24) compete against each other in live broadcasts. Within the first live round, the surviving six acts from each team again compete head-to-head, with public votes determining one of two acts from each team that will advance to the final eight, while the coach chooses which of the remaining acts comprises the other performer remaining on the team. The television audience and the coaches have equal say 50/50 in deciding who moves on to the semi-final. In the semi-final the results are based on a mix of public vote, Spotify listening and Ruutu.fi viewing of the previous week's performances, and voting of coaches. Each carries equal weight of 100 points for a total of 300 points. With one team member remaining for each coach, the (final 4) contestants compete against each other in the finale with the outcome decided by Spotify/Ruutu.fi vote and public vote, both with equal weight of 100 points for a total of 200 points.

All finalists will release a single and the winner will receive a record deal with Universal. In addition, the winner gets an Opel Mokka at his/her disposal for one year.

== Episodes ==
=== The Blind Auditions ===
Key	Coach hit his or her "I WANT YOU" button	Contestant eliminated with no coach pressing his or her "I WANT YOU" button	Contestant defaulted to this coach's team	Contestant elected to join this coach's team

==== Episode 1: January 4, 2013 ====
Order	Contestant	Song	Coaches' and Contestants' Choices			
Order	Contestant	Song	Elastinen	Lauri Tähkä	Paula Koivuniemi	Michael Monroe
1	Antti Railio	"Who Wants to Live Forever"				
2	Anni Saikku	"You and I"	—	—	—	—
3	Marija Tauriainen	"Holding Out for a Hero"	—		—	—
4	Eve Hotti	"Nobody's Perfect"	—		—	—
5	Erik Forsström	"My Hero"	—	—	—	—
6	Reetta Kaartinen	"I'm Yours"	—	—		—
7	Suvi Aalto	"Listen"		—	—	
8	Olivia Amupala	"Feeling Good"	—	—	—	—
9	Reetta Korhonen	"Dark Side"	—	—	—	—
10	Janina Aro	"I Don't Want to Talk About It"	—		—	—
11	Päivisusanna Raatikainen	"Ikävä"	—	—	—	—
12	Tomas Höglund	"You Are So Beautiful"				
13	Gary Revel Jr.	"The Show Must Go On"	—			

==== Episode 2: January 11, 2013 ====
Order	Contestant	Song	Coaches' and Contestants' Choices			
Order	Contestant	Song	Elastinen	Lauri Tähkä	Paula Koivuniemi	Michael Monroe
1	Luca Sturniolo	"Still Loving You"	—	—	—	—
2	Laura Savio	"Hair"				—
3	Ilari Hämäläinen	"Ensi Kertaa"	—	—	—	—
4	Pekka Lehtola	"Ain't No Sunshine"	—	—		—
5	Osku Ketola	"Kelpaat Kelle Vaan"	—	—		—
6	Ikenna (Ike) Ikegwuonu	"Save Room"		—		—
7	Rebecka Sretenovíc	"Annie's Song"	—	—	—	—
8	Saija-Reetta Kotirinta	"Maan Päällä Niin Kuin Taivaassa"	—	—	—	—
9	Emilia Ekström	"Jolene"	—		—	—
10	Sini Kupiainen	"The Story"	—	—	—	—
11	Anna Paatero	"You and I"	—	—	—	—
12	Maya Paakkari	"Whole Lotta Rosie"	—		—	

==== Episode 3: January 18, 2013 ====
Order	Contestant	Song	Coaches' and Contestants' Choices			
Order	Contestant	Song	Elastinen	Lauri Tähkä	Paula Koivuniemi	Michael Monroe
1	Annica Milan	"I Wanna Dance with Somebody (Who Loves Me)"	—	—	—	
2	Henri Winter	"Basket Case"	—	—	—	—
3	Christa Renwall	"At Last"				—
4	Kirsi Lehtosaari	"Läpikulkumatkalla"	—			—
5	Toni Savolainen	"Bad Company"	—	—	—	—
6	Ilona Chevakova	"You Oughta Know"	—	—	—	—
7	Regina Chevakova	"I Put a Spell on You"	—	—	—	
8	Milla Kakko	"Jar of Hearts"	—	—	—	—
9	Laura Alajääski	"Stop"	—	—		—
10	Henry Lee Roots	"Enjoy the Silence"	—	—	—	—
11	Reeta Vestman	"Listen"		—		
12	Christian Casagrande	"Highway to Hell"		—		

==== Episode 4: January 25, 2013 ====
Order	Contestant	Song	Coaches' and Contestants' Choices			
Order	Contestant	Song	Elastinen	Lauri Tähkä	Paula Koivuniemi	Michael Monroe
1	Marko Kela	"Touch Me"	—	—	—	—
2	Hanna-Maaria Tuomela	"Reflection"		—	—	
3	Katri Somerjoki	"Hymypoika"	—	—	—	—
4	Adriana Ylijurva	"Smackwater Jack"	—	—	—	—
5	Joonas Salonen	"Simple Man"	—	—		—
6	Carolina Storrank	"Read All About It (Part III)"	—	—	—	
7	Susa Saukko	"The House of the Rising Sun"	—		—	—
8	Merikukka Kiviharju	"(In My) Solitude"	—			—
9	Roope Permanto	"Naleigh Moon"	—		—	—
10	Kaapo Kokkonen	"Human"	—			—
11	Niina Kähönen	"If I Were a Boy"		—	—	

==== Episode 5: February 1, 2013 ====
Order	Contestant	Song	Coaches' and Contestants' Choices			
Order	Contestant	Song	Elastinen	Lauri Tähkä	Paula Koivuniemi	Michael Monroe
1	Jussi Määttä	"Take On Me"	—		—	—
2	Jussi Ahokas	"Kurjuuden kuningas"	—	—	—	—
3	Tea Tähtinen	"Perfect Strangers"	—	—	—	
4	Jepa Lambert	"What's Going On"		—		—
5	Veli-Pekka Tähtinen	"Billie Jean"	—	—	—	—
6	Anna-Kaisa Riitijoki	"Blue Jeans"	—			—
7	Anna Halmetoja	"Signed, Sealed, Delivered I'm Yours"		—		—
8	Anssi Tamminen	"Always on My Mind"	—	—	—	
9	Toni Häppölä	"Bohemian Rhapsody"	—	—	—	—
10	Tommi Kaikkonen	"Bridge over Troubled Water"	—			
11	Maria Kiiski	"(Sittin' On) The Dock of the Bay"	—	—	—	—
12	Johanna Pekkarinen	"Whole Lotta Love"	—		—	—

==== Episode 6: February 8, 2013 ====
Order	Contestant	Song	Coaches' and Contestants' Choices			
Order	Contestant	Song	Elastinen	Lauri Tähkä	Paula Koivuniemi	Michael Monroe
1	Jone Ullakko	"Desperado"	—			
2	Alina Huldén	"Black Velvet"	—	—	—	—
3	Linda Herranen	"Whole Lotta Love"	—	—	—	
4	Niina Sallinen	"Duran Duran"	—	—	—	—
5	Sara Komu	"Hurt"	—		—	—
6	Juna Reini	"Sait miehen kyyneliin"	—	—	—	—
7	Daniela Persson	"Use Somebody"	—			
8	Inga Söder	"Who You Are"		—		
9	Dennis Fagerström	"Can't Help Falling in Love"	—		—	—
10	Johanna Kyykoski	"I (Who Have Nothing)"	—	—	—	—
11	Katri Korpisaari	"Let's Stay Together"				

==== The Wildcards ====
Order	Contestant	Song	Coaches' and Contestants' Choices			
Order	Contestant	Song	Elastinen	Lauri Tähkä	Paula Koivuniemi	Michael Monroe
1	Juha Arikoski	"Still Loving You"	—	—	—	—
2	Luca Sturniolo	"Whole Lotta Rosie"	—	—	—	
3	Reetta Korhonen	"I Can't Make You Love Me"			—	—
4	Kadi Liivak	"I Put a Spell on You"	—	—	—	—
5	Toni Savolainen	"Ain't No Sunshine"	—	—		—
6	Johanna Kyykoski	"Kesällä kerran"		—	—	—
7	Olli Hartonen	"Breakeven"	—	—	—	—
8	Satu Piipari	"I Can't Make You Love Me"	—		—	

=== Episodes 7–10: Battle Rounds (4 weeks) ===
After the Blind Auditions, each coach had 12 contestants, except for Tähkä who had one extra. The Battle Rounds aired between February 15 and March 8.

– Battle winner

Week/Order	Coach	Contestant	Contestant	Song
1.1	Elastinen	Jepa Lambert	Katri Korpisaari	"Ain't Nobody"
1.2	Paula Koivuniemi	Anna-Kaisa Riitijoki	Laura Alajääski	"Ei se mennyt niin"
1.3	Michael Monroe	Luca Sturniolo	Linda Herranen	"Baba O'Riley"
1.4	Lauri Tähkä	Dennis Fagerström	Jussi Määttä	"Pieni sydän"
1.5	Elastinen	Christa Renwall	Tomas Höglund	"Another Day in Paradise"
1.6	Paula Koivuniemi	Daniela Persson	Antti Railio	"(I Just) Died in Your Arms"
2.1	Michael Monroe	Carolina Storrank	Regina Chevakova	"Time After Time"
2.2	Lauri Tähkä	Reetta Korhonen	Emilia Ekström	"Lautturi"
2.3	Elastinen	Ikenna Ikegwuonu	Johanna Kyykoski	"Somebody That I Used To Know"
2.4	Paula Koivuniemi	Tommi Kaikkonen	Osku Ketola	"Hyvää ja kaunista"
2.5	Lauri Tähkä	Maria Tauriainen	Susa Saukko	"Rakkautta ja piikkilankaa"
2.6	Michael Monroe	Gary Revel Jr.	Tea Tähtinen	"Tonight It's You"
3.1	Paula Koivuniemi	Reetta Kaartinen	Merikukka Kiviharju	"You Know I'm No Good"
3.2	Elastinen	Niina Kähönen	Anna Halmetoja	"Complicated"
3.3	Michael Monroe	Anssi Tamminen	Jone Ullakko	"The Heart of the Matter"
3.4	Lauri Tähkä	Sara Komu	Eveliina Hotti	"Jäätelökesä"
3.5	Paula Koivuniemi	Pekka Lehtola	Kirsi Lehtosaari	"Tahroja paperilla"
3.6	Elastinen	Hanna-Maaria Tuomela	Laura Savio	"Puhu äänellä jonka kuulen"
4.1	Lauri Tähkä	Kaapo Kokkonen	Roope Permanto	"Yhtenä iltana"
4.2	Michael Monroe	Annica Milan	Suvi Aalto	"Crazy on You"
4.3	Elastinen	Inga Söder	Reeta Vestman	"No One"
4.4	Paula Koivuniemi	Toni Savolainen	Joonas Salonen	"She's a Lady"
4.6	Michael Monroe	Christian Casagrande	Maya Paakkari	"Razamanaz"

Week/Order	Coach	Contestant	Contestant	Contestant	Song
4.5	Lauri Tähkä	Satu Piipari	Johanna Pekkarinen	Janina Aro	"Mullonikäväsua"

The trusted advisors for these episodes are: producer Jukka Immonen working with Elastinen; musician and composer Milla Viljamaa working with Lauri Tähkä; producer Mika Toivanen with Paula Koivuniemi; and producer Riku Mattila working with Michael Monroe.

– Eliminated in the battle rounds

Coach	Adviser	Contestant					
Elastinen	Jukka Immonen	Jepa Lambert	Christa Renwall	Ikenna Ikegwuonu	Niina Kähönen	Hanna-Maaria Tuomela	Inga Söder
Elastinen	Jukka Immonen	Katri Koivusaari	Tomas Höglund	Johanna Kyykoski	Anna Halmetoja	Laura Savio	Reeta Vestman
Lauri Tähkä	Milla Viljamaa	Dennis Fagerström	Reetta Korhonen	Maria Tauriainen	Sara Komu	Kaapo Kokkonen	Johanna Pekkarinen
Lauri Tähkä	Milla Viljamaa	Jussi Määttä	Emilia Ekström	Susa Saukko	Eve Hotti	Roope Permanto	Janina Aro; Satu Piipari
Paula Koivuniemi	Mika Toivanen	Anna-Kaisa Riitijoki	Daniela Persson	Tommi Kaikkonen	Reetta Kaartinen	Pekka Lehtola	Toni Savolainen
Paula Koivuniemi	Mika Toivanen	Laura Alajääski	Antti Railio	Osku Ketola	Merikukka Kiviharju	Kirsi Lehtosaari	Joonas Salonen
Michael Monroe	Riku Mattila	Luca Sturniolo	Carolina Storrank	Gary Revel Jr.	Anssi Tamminen	Annica Milan	Christian Casagrande
Michael Monroe	Riku Mattila	Linda Herranen	Regina Chevakova	Tea Tähtinen	Jone Ullakko	Suvi Aalto	Maya Paakkari

=== The Live Rounds ===
==== Episode 1: March 15, 2013 ====
Performance Order	Coach	Contestant	Song	Result
1	Michael Monroe	Gary Revel Jr	"Don't Stop Believin'"	Michael Monroe's vote
2	Lauri Tähkä	Eve Hotti	"Nuori ja kaunis"	Lauri Tähkä's vote
3	Michael Monroe	Luca Sturniolo	"Stop This Game"	Eliminated
4	Lauri Tähkä	Dennis Fagerström	"Näytän sulle rannan"	Public vote
5	Michael Monroe	Jone Ullakko	"Bad Case of Loving You"	Public vote
6	Lauri Tähkä	Marija	"Tässä elämä on"	Eliminated
7	Elastinen	Inga Söder	"One"	Elastinen's vote
8	Paula Koivuniemi	Osku Ketola	"Kuu"	Public vote
9	Elastinen	Niina Kähönen	"Vision of Love"	Public vote
10	Paula Koivuniemi	Toni Savolainen	"I Don't Need No Doctor"	Eliminated
11	Elastinen	Laura Savio	"Try"	Eliminated
12	Paula Koivuniemi	Antti Railio	"Maniac"	Paula Koivuniemi's vote

==== Episode 2: March 22, 2013 ====
Performance Order	Coach	Contestant	Song	Result
1	Elastinen	Jepa Lambert	"Halo"	Eliminated
2	Lauri Tähkä	Kaapo Kokkonen	"Näe minut tässä"	Lauri Tähkä's vote
3	Elastinen	Tomas Höglund	"I Can't Make You Love Me"	Elastinen's vote
4	Lauri Tähkä	Johanna Pekkarinen	"Kohtalon oma"	Eliminated
5	Elastinen	Ikenna Ikegwuonu	"I Believe I Can Fly"	Public vote
6	Lauri Tähkä	Emilia Ekström	"Rakkauslaulu"	Public vote
7	Paula Koivuniemi	Reetta Kaartinen	"Supreme"	Eliminated
8	Michael Monroe	Suvi Aalto	"Undo It"	Public vote
9	Paula Koivuniemi	Laura Alajääski	"Pikku lurjus"	Paula Koivuniemi's vote
10	Michael Monroe	Regina Chevakova	"Sober"	Eliminated
11	Paula Koivuniemi	Kirsi Lehtosaari	"Mä annan sut pois"	Public vote
12	Michael Monroe	Christian Casagrande	"Rock and Roll"	Michael Monroe's vote

==== Episode 3: March 29, 2013 ====
Performance Order	Coach	Contestant	Song	Result
1	Paula Koivuniemi	Kirsi Lehtosaari	"Katson autiota hiekkarantaa"	Eliminated
2	Elastinen	Inga Söder	"My All"	Elastinen's vote
3	Paula Koivuniemi	Antti Railio	"Rebel Yell"	Paula Koivuniemi's vote
4	Elastinen	Ikenna Ikegwuonu	"So Sick"	Public vote
5	Paula Koivuniemi	Laura Alajääski	"Elämän nälkä"	Paula Koivuniemi's vote
6	Elastinen	Niina Kähönen	"I Want You Back"	Eliminated
7	Paula Koivuniemi	Osku Ketola	"Kukkurukuu"	Public vote
8	Elastinen	Tomas Höglund	"The Power of Love"	Elastinen's vote

==== Episode 4: April 5, 2013 ====
Performance Order	Coach	Contestant	Song	Result
1	Michael Monroe	Jone Ullakko	"Wanted Dead or Alive"	Eliminated
2	Lauri Tähkä	Eve Hotti	"Jos sä tahdot niin"	Lauri Tähkä's vote
3	Michael Monroe	Christian Casagrande	"Dude (Looks Like a Lady)"	Michael Monroe's vote
4	Lauri Tähkä	Emilia Ekström	"On elämä laina"	Public vote
5	Michael Monroe	Suvi Aalto	"I Remember You"	Public vote
6	Lauri Tähkä	Dennis Fagerström	"Ainutkertainen"	Lauri Tähkä's vote
7	Michael Monroe	Gary Revel Jr	"Many Rivers to Cross"	Michael Monroe's vote
8	Lauri Tähkä	Kaapo Kokkonen	"Kaikki nuoret tyypit"	Eliminated

==== Episode 5: April 12, 2013 ====
Performance Order	Coach	Contestant	Song	Result
1	Elastinen	Inga Söder	"Girl on Fire"	Eliminated
2	Paula Koivuniemi	Osku Ketola	"Aurora"	Paula Koivuniemi's vote
3	Lauri Tähkä	Dennis Fagerström	"Linnuton puu"	Lauri Tähkä's vote
4	Michael Monroe	Gary Revel Jr	"Tie Your Mother Down"	Michael Monroe's vote
5	Elastinen	Ike Ikegwuonu	"Let Me Love You"	Elastinen's vote
6	Paula Koivuniemi	Antti Railio	"Romanssi"	Public vote
7	Lauri Tähkä	Emilia Ekström	"Hento kuiskaus"	Public vote
8	Michael Monroe	Christian Casagrande	"Welcome to the Jungle"	Eliminated
9	Elastinen	Tomas Höglund	"Grace is Gone"	Public vote
10	Paula Koivuniemi	Laura Alajääski	"Jos sua ei ois ollut"	Eliminated
11	Lauri Tähkä	Eve Hotti	"En haluu kuolla tänä yönä"	Eliminated
12	Michael Monroe	Suvi Aalto	"Sama nainen"	Public vote

==== Semifinal: April 19, 2013 ====
Competition performances

Performance Order	Coach	Contestant	Song	Result
1	Michael Monroe	Suvi Aalto	"Stupid Girl"	Advancing
2	Lauri Tähkä	Dennis Fagerström	"Minun tuulessa soi"	Eliminated
3	Paula Koivuniemi	Osku Ketola	"Leijat"	Eliminated
4	Elastinen	Ike Ikegwuonu	"Silkkii"	Advancing
5	Michael Monroe	Gary Revel Jr	"Sweet Child o' Mine"	Eliminated
6	Lauri Tähkä	Emilia Ekström	"Joutsenet"	Advancing
7	Paula Koivuniemi	Antti Railio	"Skyfall"	Advancing
8	Elastinen	Tomas Höglund	"Pride (In the Name of Love)"	Eliminated

Semi-Final results

Team	Artist	Coach points	Spotify/Ruutu.fi points	Public points	Total points	Result
Michael Monroe	Suvi Aalto	49	67	61	177	Advancing to final
Michael Monroe	Gary Revel Jr	51	33	39	123	Eliminated
Lauri Tähkä	Emilia Ekström	60	51	48	159	Advancing to final
Lauri Tähkä	Dennis Fagerström	40	49	52	141	Eliminated
Paula Koivuniemi	Antti Railio	60	62	73	195	Advancing to final
Paula Koivuniemi	Osku Ketola	40	38	27	105	Eliminated
Elastinen	Ike Ikegwuonu	60	54	48	162	Advancing to final
Elastinen	Tomas Höglund	40	46	52	138	Eliminated

==== Final: April 26, 2013 ====
Competition performances

Each finalist performed an original song and a duet with their team coach.

Performance Order	Coach	Contestant	Type	Song	Result
1	Michael Monroe	Suvi Aalto	Duet	"Kids" (with Michael Monroe)	3rd-4th place
2	Paula Koivuniemi	Antti Railio	Duet	"Kuuleeko yö" (with Paula Koivuniemi)	Winner
3	Elastinen	Ike Ikegwuonu	Duet	"Jos mä oisin sun mies" (with Elastinen)	3rd-4th place
4	Lauri Tähkä	Emilia Ekström	Duet	"Mysteriet" (with Lauri Tähkä)	Runner-up
5	Michael Monroe	Suvi Aalto	Solo	"Kuuntelen"	3rd-4th place
6	Paula Koivuniemi	Antti Railio	Solo	"Sulava jää"	Winner
7	Elastinen	Ike Ikegwuonu	Solo	"Vaiheillaan"	3rd-4th place
8	Lauri Tähkä	Emilia Ekström	Solo	"Askel askeleelta"	Runner-up

Final results

– Winner
– Runner-up
– 3rd/4th place

Artist	Team	Spotify/Ruutu.fi points	Public points	Total points	Result
Antti Railio	Paula Koivuniemi	57	67	124	Winner
Emilia Ekström	Lauri Tähkä	43	33	76	Runner-up
Suvi Aalto	Michael Monroe	—N/a	—N/a	—N/a	3rd/4th place
Ike Ikegwuonu	Elastinen	—N/a	—N/a	—N/a	3rd/4th place

=== The Best of the Voice of Finland: May 4, 2013 ===
All finalists and semifinalists performing live on a cruise day after the final.

== Summaries ==
=== Results table ===
Color Key

– Team Elastinen
– Team Lauri
– Team Paula
– Team Michael

Contestant	Top 24	Top 16	Quarter-finals	Semi-final	Final
Contestant	Top 24	Top 16	Top 12	Top 8	Top 4
Antti Railio	Paula's choice	Paula's choice	Public choice	Advanced	Winner
Emilia Ekström	Public choice	Public choice	Public choice	Advanced	Runner-up
Suvi Aalto	Public choice	Public choice	Public choice	Advanced	3rd-4th place
Ike Ikegwuonu	Public choice	Public choice	Elastinen's choice	Advanced	3rd-4th place
Tomas Höglund	Elastinen's choice	Elastinen's choice	Public choice	Not advanced	Eliminated (5th–8th place)
Dennis Fagerström	Public choice	Lauri's choice	Lauri's choice	Not advanced	Eliminated (5th–8th place)
Osku Ketola	Public choice	Public choice	Paula's choice	Not advanced	Eliminated (5th–8th place)
Gary Revel Jr	Michael's choice	Michael's choice	Michael's choice	Not advanced	Eliminated (5th–8th place)
Inga Söder	Elastinen's choice	Elastinen's choice	Not saved	Eliminated (9th–12th place)	
Eve Hotti	Lauri's choice	Lauri's choice	Not saved	Eliminated (9th–12th place)	
Laura Alajääski	Paula's choice	Paula's choice	Not saved	Eliminated (9th–12th place)	
Christian Casagrande	Michael's choice	Michael's choice	Not saved	Eliminated (9th–12th place)	
Niina Kähönen	Public choice	Not saved	Eliminated (13th–16th place)		
Kaapo Kokkonen	Lauri's choice	Not saved	Eliminated (13th–16th place)		
Kirsi Lehtosaari	Public choice	Not saved	Eliminated (13th–16th place)		
Jone Ullakko	Public choice	Not saved	Eliminated (13th–16th place)		
Laura Savio	Not saved	Eliminated (17th–24th place)			
Jepa Lambert	Not saved	Eliminated (17th–24th place)			
Marija	Not saved	Eliminated (17th–24th place)			
Johanna Pekkarinen	Not saved	Eliminated (17th–24th place)			
Toni Savolainen	Not saved	Eliminated (17th–24th place)			
Reetta Kaartinen	Not saved	Eliminated (17th–24th place)			
Luca Sturniolo	Not saved	Eliminated (17th–24th place)			
Regina Chevakova	Not saved	Eliminated (17th–24th place)			

== Reception and TV ratings ==
Season two premiered on January 4, 2013 and was watched by 746,000 viewers. It was down 8.9 percent from first season's premiere December 30, 2011 which was the most viewed program on Nelonen in the year 2011. The Voice of Finland airs twice a week, first Friday evening at 8:00 pm and re-run on Sunday afternoon at 5:00 pm.

#	Episode	Original air date	Time	Rating on same day	Rating within 7 days
1	"Season 2 Premiere"	January 4, 2013	Friday 8:00pm	n/a	746,000
2	"The Blind Auditions, Part 2"	January 11, 2013	Friday 8:00pm	695,000	733,000
3	"The Blind Auditions, Part 3"	January 18, 2013	Friday 8:00pm	717,000	780,000
4	"The Blind Auditions, Part 4"	January 25, 2013	Friday 8:00pm	683,000	720,000
5	"The Blind Auditions, Part 5"	February 1, 2013	Friday 8:00pm	743,000	803,000
6	"The Blind Auditions, Part 6"	February 8, 2013	Friday 8:00pm	787,000	837,000
7	"The Battle, Part 1"	February 15, 2013	Friday 8:00pm	697,000	745,000
8	"The Battle, Part 2"	February 22, 2013	Friday 8:00pm	718,000	762,000
9	"The Battle, Part 3"	March 1, 2013	Friday 8:00pm	640,000	694,000
10	"The Battle, Part 4"	March 8, 2013	Friday 8:00pm	609,000	661,000
11	"Live show 1"	March 15, 2013	Friday 8:00pm	698,000	735,000
12	"Live show 2"	March 22, 2013	Friday 8:00pm	673,000	719,000
13	"Live show 3"	March 29, 2013	Friday 8:00pm	660,000	680,000
14	"Live show 4"	April 5, 2013	Friday 8:00pm	619,000	659,000
15	"Live show 5"	April 12, 2013	Friday 8:00pm	620,000	650,000
16	"Semifinal"	April 19, 2013	Friday 8:00pm	621,000	647,000
17	"Final"	April 26, 2013	Friday 8:00pm	755,000	779,000
18	"Best of"	May 4, 2013	Saturday 7:00pm	104,000	109,000

Notes

- Rating is the average number of viewers during the program.
- The latest weekly ratings contain timeshift viewing only during the same day. Older weekly ratings contain timeshift viewing during seven days.

== See also ==
- The Voice (TV series)
- fi:The Voice of Finland
