= The Voice of Finland season 1 =

Reality TV show

The Voice of Finland
- Season 1
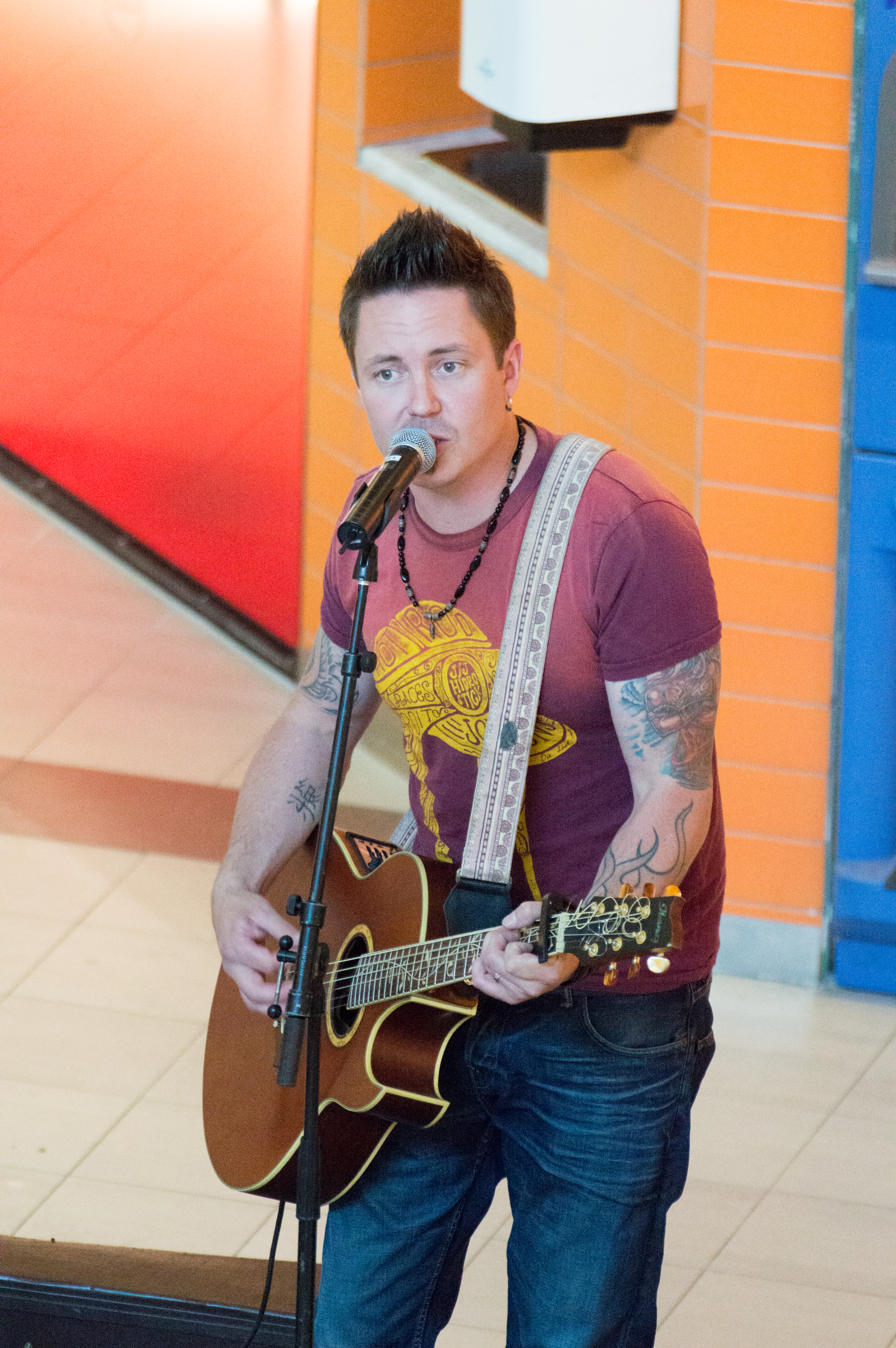
- Hosted by: Axl Smith; Kristiina Komulainen (social media)
- Judges: Elastinen; Lauri Tähkä; Paula Koivuniemi; Michael Monroe
- Winner: Mikko Sipola
- Winning coach: Elastinen
- Runner-up: Saara Aalto
- Finals venue: Logomo, Turku

Release
- Original network: Nelonen
- Original release: December 30, 2011 – April 20, 2012

Season chronology
- Next → Season 2

The Voice of Finland (season 1) was the first season of the Finnish reality singing competition based on the international The Voice format. The season premiered on Nelonen on December 30, 2011, and concluded on April 20, 2012.

The coaches were legendary singer Paula Koivuniemi, glam rock singer Michael Monroe, former Lauri Tähkä & Elonkerjuu frontman Lauri Tähkä, and rapper Elastinen. Axl Smith hosted the program, with Kristiina Komulainen serving as the backstage and social networking correspondent.

The winner of the first season was Mikko Sipola, mentored by Elastinen. The runner-up was Saara Aalto.

== Overview ==
The series consists of three phases: a blind audition, a battle phase, and live performance shows. Four judges/coaches, all noteworthy recording artists, choose teams of contestants through a blind audition process where the coaches cannot see, but only hear the auditioner. Each judge has the length of the auditioner's performance (about one minute) to decide if they want that singer on their team; if two or more judges want the same singer (as happens frequently), the singer has the final choice of coach.

At the end of the blind auditions only Lauri Tähkä had full team of twelve singers. In the following additional auditions broadcast on Radio Aalto, all coaches added one more singer to their teams, leaving Tähkä with one extra.

Each team of contestants is mentored and developed by its respective coach. In the second stage, called the battle phase, coaches have two of their team members battle against each other directly by singing the same song together, with the coach choosing which team member to advance from each of four individual "battles" into the first live round. At this stage the coaches were assisted by songwriter and producer Jukka Immonen (Elastinen), the vocalist of Reckless Love Olli Herman (Tähkä), singer-songwriter and producer Lasse Kurki (Koivuniemi), and producer Riku Mattila (Monroe).

In the final phase, the remaining contestants (Final 24) compete against each other in live broadcasts. Within the first live round, the surviving six acts from each team again compete head-to-head, with public votes determining one of two acts from each team that will advance to the final eight, while the coach chooses which of the remaining acts comprises the other performer remaining on the team. The television audience and the coaches have equal say 50/50 in deciding who moves on to the semi-final. In the semi-final the results are based on a mix of public vote, Spotify listening of the previous week's performances, and voting of coaches. Each carries equal weight of 100 points for a total of 300 points. With one team member remaining for each coach, the (final 4) contestants compete against each other in the finale with the outcome decided by Spotify vote and public vote, both with equal weight of 100 points for a total of 200 points.

All four finalists released a single and the winner received a record deal with Universal.

== Episodes ==
=== The Blind Auditions ===
Key	Coach hit his or her "I WANT YOU" button	Contestant eliminated with no coach pressing his or her "I WANT YOU" button	Contestant defaulted to this coach's team	Contestant elected to join this coach's team

==== Episode 1: December 30, 2011 ====
Order	Contestant	Song	Coaches' and Contestants' Choices			
Order	Contestant	Song	Elastinen	Lauri Tähkä	Paula Koivuniemi	Michael Monroe
1	Mia Tuuli	"Tuo tumma nainen"	—	—	—	—
2	Lauri Mikkola	"Ain't No Sunshine"		—	—	—
3	Riina Heikkinen	"Firework"	—	—	—	—
4	Karoliina Kallio	"Alone"			—	—
5	Ilmo Ylinärä	"It's a Man's Man's World"	—	—	—	—
6	Toni Eurasto	"Hallelujah"				
7	Fatou Haidara	"Empire State of Mind"	—	—	—	—
8	Selja Felin	"Smile"				
9	Krista Siegfrids	"You Shook Me All Night Long"				
10	Mikko Herranen	"Easy"		—		

==== Episode 2: January 6, 2012 ====
Order	Contestant	Song	Coaches' and Contestants' Choices			
Order	Contestant	Song	Elastinen	Lauri Tähkä	Paula Koivuniemi	Michael Monroe
1	Henrika Ignatius	"On the Radio"				
2	Lotta Svartsjö	"Can't Take My Eyes off You"	—	—	—	—
3	Nelli Petro	"Rolling in the Deep"		—		—
4	Ville Pyykönen	"Silta yli synkän virran"	—	—	—	—
5	Sanni Säntti	"Pettävällä jäällä"	—		—	—
6	Weera Suonmaa	"Fool"	—	—	—	—
7	Toni Hiltunen	"You've Got a Friend"	—		—	
8	Niklas Grönholm	"Your Song"	—	—	—	—
9	Sari Hurme	"The Best"	—	—	—	—
10	Mia Renwall	"Someone Like You"	—			—
11	Mikko Sipola	"Don't Want to be"				

==== Episode 3: January 13, 2012 ====
Order	Contestant	Song	Coaches' and Contestants' Choices			
Order	Contestant	Song	Elastinen	Lauri Tähkä	Paula Koivuniemi	Michael Monroe
1	Bettina Hammarsten	"Rolling in the Deep"		—	—	—
2	Isabella Hammarsten	"Mercy"			—	—
3	Tero Heikari	"Puhu hiljaa rakkaudesta"	—	—	—	—
4	Anfisa Proskuryakova	"Natural Woman"		—		
5	Krista Honkonen	"We Don't Need Another Hero"	—	—	—	—
6	Tony Romeo	"Silta yli synkän virran"	—	—	—	
7	Sofia Holmberg	"You Know My Name"	—	—	—	—
8	Oskari Salovaara	"The Best"	—	—		—
9	Amanda Löfman	"Indian"	—		—	—
10	Lotta Lené	"Taking Chances"		—	—	—
11	Minna Eskola	"Smile"				

==== Episode 4: January 20, 2012 ====
Order	Contestant	Song	Coaches' and Contestants' Choices			
Order	Contestant	Song	Elastinen	Lauri Tähkä	Paula Koivuniemi	Michael Monroe
1	Siiri Nojonen	"Keihäänkärki"				—
2	Osku Bom	"You Know My Name"	—	—	—	—
3	Sam Mouden	"It's a Man's Man's World"	—	—	—	—
4	Ina Möller	"I Got Trouble"	—	—	—	—
5	Valerie Nyholm	"Mercy	—		—	—
6	Jesse Kaikuranta	"The Edge of Glory"	—			—
7	Minna Lasanen	"Natural Woman"	—		—	—
8	Maria Marsch	"You Know I'm No Good"	—	—	—	—
9	Kimmo Härma	"Can't Help Falling In Love"				
10	Juho Raisänen	"Easy"		—		—
11	Taru Ratilainen	"Georgia on My Mind"				—

==== Episode 5: January 27, 2012 ====
Order	Contestant	Song	Coaches' and Contestants' Choices			
Order	Contestant	Song	Elastinen	Lauri Tähkä	Paula Koivuniemi	Michael Monroe
1	Rami Hentilä	"Angels"	—	—	—	—
2	Jani Partinen	"It's My Life"	—	—	—	—
3	Johanna Mäkelä	"Kesällä kerran"	—			—
4	Heini Särmäkari	"Alone"	—	—	—	
5	Jari Uutela	"Voi kuinka me sinua kaivataan"	—	—	—	—
6	Sophie Aittola	"Someone Like You"	—	—	—	—
7	Markku Kirves	"Matkustaja"	—		—	—
8	Ella Tukia	"Ain't No Sunshine"	—		—	—
9	Mya Rydman	"Firework"	—		—	
10	Erkki Korhonen	"I Surrender"	—	—	—	—
11	Jelena Knef	"Piste"			—	
12	Eveliina Tammenlaakso	"It's a Man's Man's Man's World"		—	—	—
13	J-P Salo	"I Don't Want To Be"	—			

==== Episode 6: February 6, 2012 ====
Order	Contestant	Song	Coaches' and Contestants' Choices			
Order	Contestant	Song	Elastinen	Lauri Tähkä	Paula Koivuniemi	Michael Monroe
1	Anna Inginmaa	"You Raise Me Up"	—	—	—	
2	Mari Rautanen	"Ain't No Sunshine"	—		—	—
3	Aki Louhela	"Straight from the Heart"		—		
4	Robertta Simonen	"Edge of Glory"	—	—	—	—
5	Pihla Knaapila	"As"	—	—	—	—
6	Johanna Mäkelä	"Good Luck"				—
7	Nelli Järvelä	"Your Song"			—	—
8	Hanna Silander	"Missä muruseni on"	—	—		—
9	Tanja Vähäsarja	"Jos menet pois"	—	—		—
10	Laura Malmberg	"Sweet Child O' Mine"				—
11	Saara Aalto	"Taking Chances"				
12	Antti Matikainen	"Grenade"				

==== The Wildcards ====
Order	Contestant	Song	Coaches' and Contestants' Choices			
Order	Contestant	Song	Elastinen	Lauri Tähkä	Paula Koivuniemi	Michael Monroe
1	Victoria Björndahl	"Firework"	—	—	—	—
2	Ilmo Ylinärä	"Whole Lotta Love"				
3	Ina Forsman	TBA	—	—	—	—
4	Jenni Haapakorva	TBA	—	—	—	—
5	Sophie Aittola	"Whataya Want from Me"	—	—		—
6	Pihla Knaapila	"We Don't Need Another Hero"		—	—	—
7	Kim Koskinen	"Whataya Want from Me"				—

=== The Battle Rounds ===
Aired from February 10 to March 2, 2012.

– Battle Winner

Week/Order	Coach	Contestant	Contestant	Song
1.1	Lauri Tähkä	Nelli Järvelä	Selja Felin	"Sun särkyä anna mä en"
1.2	Michael Monroe	Ilmo Ylinärä	Kimmo Härmä	"Hard to Handle"
1.3	Elastinen	Lauri Mikkola	Henrika Ignatius	"Moves Like Jagger"
1.4	Paula Koivuniemi	Tanja Vähäsarja	Johanna Mäkelä	"Hölmö Rakkaus"
1.5	Lauri Tähkä	Heidi Akselin	Valerie Nyholm	"Only Girl (In the World)"
1.6	Elastinen	Bettina Hammarsten	Isabella Hammarsten	"Lady Marmalade"
2.1	Elastinen	Mikko Sipola	Laura Malmberg	"Wonderwall"
2.2	Michael Monroe	Tony Romeo	Mikko Herranen	"The Flame"
2.3	Lauri Tähkä	Jelena Knief	Sanna Säntti	"Katujen Kuningatar"
2.4	Paula Koivuniemi	Nelli Petro	Minna Eskola	"Crazy"
2.5	Michael Monroe	Anna Inginmaa	Saara Aalto	"True Colors"
2.6	Paula Koivuniemi	Jesse Kaikuranta	Juho Räisänen	"Minä ja Hän"
3.1	Lauri Tähkä	Antti Matikainen	Markku Kirves	"Hetki Lyö"
3.2	Elastinen	Pihla Knaapila	Eveliina Tammenlaakso	"Set Fire to the Rain"
3.3	Michael Monroe	Krista Siegfrids	Mya Rydman	"Because the Night"
3.4	Paula Koivuniemi	Sophie Aittola	Mia Renwall	"Rakkauden Haudalla"
3.5	Lauri Tähkä	Minna Lasanen	Amanda Löfman	"Stop!"
3.6	Elastinen	Taru Ratilainen	Siiri Nojonen	"Just the Way You Are"
4.1	Michael Monroe	Toni Hiltunen	Toni Eurasto	"Feel"
4.2	Paula Koivuniemi	Anfisa Proskuryakova	Hanna Silander	"Hiljaisuus"
4.4	Michael Monroe	J-P Salo	Heini Särmäkari	"Run to You"
4.5	Paula Koivuniemi	Aki Louhela	Oskari Salovaara	"Maybe I'm Amazed"
4.6	Elastinen	Lotta Lené	Karoliina Kallio	"The Power of Love"

Week/Order	Coach	Contestant	Contestant	Contestant	Song
4.3	Lauri Tähkä	Mari Rautanen	Ella Tukia	Kim Koskinen	"Wicked Game"

=== The Live Rounds ===
==== Episode 1: March 9, 2012 ====
Performance Order	Coach	Contestant	Song	Result
1	Michael Monroe	Kimmo Härmä	"Beautiful Day"	Michael Monroe's vote
2	Lauri Tähkä	Sanna Säntti	"Musta aurinko nousee"	Lauri Tähkä's vote
3	Michael Monroe	J-P Salo	"Wishing Well"	Eliminated
4	Lauri Tähkä	Antti Matikainen	"Olkinainen"	Lauri Tähkä's vote
5	Michael Monroe	Krista Siegfrids	"Piece of My Heart"	Eliminated
6	Lauri Tähkä	Selja Felin	"All My Loving"	Eliminated
7	Michael Monroe	Toni Hiltunen	"Boys of Summer"	Michael Monroe's vote
8	Lauri Tähkä	Kim Koskinen	"18 and Life"	Public vote
9	Michael Monroe	Mikko Herranen	"Time Is Running Out"	Public vote
10	Lauri Tähkä	Valerie Nyholm	"Love the Way You Lie (Part II)"	Eliminated
11	Michael Monroe	Saara Aalto	"What Hurts the Most"	Public vote
12	Lauri Tähkä	Amanda Löfman	"The Show Must Go On"	Public vote

==== Episode 2: March 16, 2012 ====
Performance Order	Coach	Contestant	Song	Result
1	Paula Koivuniemi	Aki Louhela	"I Won't Let You Go"	Public vote
2	Elastinen	Karoliina Kallio	"If I Had You"	Eliminated
3	Paula Koivuniemi	Anfisa Proskuryakova	"Nobody's Perfect"	Eliminated
4	Elastinen	Mikko Sipola	"Use Somebody"	Public vote
5	Paula Koivuniemi	Tanja Vähäsarja	"Vanha sydän"	Public vote
6	Elastinen	Lauri Mikkola	"Open Your Eyes"	Elastinen's vote
7	Paula Koivuniemi	Nelli Petro	"C'est la vie"	Paula Koivuniemi's vote
8	Elastinen	Taru Ratilainen	"Fallin'"	Elastinen's vote
9	Paula Koivuniemi	Jesse Kaikuranta	"Piiloon"	Paula Koivuniemi's vote
10	Elastinen	Eveliina Tammenlaakso	"Respect"	Public vote
11	Paula Koivuniemi	Sophie Aittola	"I Don't Believe You"	Eliminated
12	Elastinen	Isabella Hammarsten	"Rude Boy"	Eliminated

==== Episode 3: March 23, 2012 ====
Performance Order	Coach	Contestant	Song	Result
1	Lauri Tähkä	Antti Matikainen	"Ohikiitävää"	Lauri Tähkä's vote
2	Michael Monroe	Saara Aalto	"Barracuda"	Michael Monroe's vote
3	Lauri Tähkä	Kim Koskinen	"Bed of Roses"	Public vote
4	Michael Monroe	Mikko Herranen	"The Kill"	Public vote
5	Lauri Tähkä	Amanda Löfman	"Like a Prayer"	Lauri Tähkä's vote
6	Michael Monroe	Toni Hiltunen	"Somebody to Love"	Eliminated
7	Lauri Tähkä	Sanna Säntti	"Kuunnellaan vaan taivasta"	Eliminated
8	Michael Monroe	Kimmo Härmä	"Hopeinen Kuu"	Michael Monroe's vote

==== Episode 4: March 30, 2012 ====
Performance Order	Coach	Contestant	Song	Result
1	Elastinen	Taru Ratilainen	"If I Were a Boy"	Eliminated
2	Paula Koivuniemi	Nelli Petro	"Whataya Want From Me"	Eliminated
3	Elastinen	Eveliina Tammenlaakso	"Titanium"	Elastinen's vote
4	Paula Koivuniemi	Jesse Kaikuranta	"Veden alla"	Public vote
5	Elastinen	Mikko Sipola	"Stay"	Public Vote
6	Paula Koivuniemi	Aki Louhela	"Heard It Through The Grapevine"	Paula Koivuniemi's vote
7	Elastinen	Lauri Mikkola	"Bad"	Elastinen's vote
8	Paula Koivuniemi	Tanja Vähäsarja	"Vapaa"	Paula Koivuniemi's vote

==== Episode 5: April 6, 2012 ====
Performance Order	Coach	Contestant	Song	Result
1	Michael Monroe	Saara Aalto	"Je Suis Malade"	Public vote
2	Michael Monroe	Mikko Herranen	"Rakkaudesta"	Michael Monroe's vote
3	Michael Monroe	Kimmo Härmä	"Only Women Bleed"	Eliminated
4	Elastinen	Mikko Sipola	"How You Remind Me"	Public Vote
5	Elastinen	Lauri Mikkola	"Kiss from a Rose"	Elastinen's vote
6	Elastinen	Eveliina Tammenlaakso	"Super Bass"	Eliminated
7	Paula Koivuniemi	Tanja Vähäsarja	"Exodus"	Eliminated
8	Paula Koivuniemi	Jesse Kaikuranta	"Sininen Sointu"	Paula Koivuniemi's vote
9	Paula Koivuniemi	Aki Louhela	"Can't Get Enough"	Public vote
10	Lauri Tähkä	Antti Matikainen	"Koneeseen kadonnut"	Eliminated
11	Lauri Tähkä	Amanda Löfman	"Nothing Else Matters"	Lauri Tähkä's vote
12	Lauri Tähkä	Kim Koskinen	"Live and Let Die"	Public vote

==== Semi-Final: April 13, 2012 ====
Competition performances

Performance Order	Coach	Contestant	Song	Result
1	Lauri Tähkä	Amanda Löfman	"Can't Hurry Love"	Eliminated
2	Paula Koivuniemi	Jesse Kaikuranta	"Hetken tie on kevyt"	Advancing
3	Elastinen	Lauri Mikkola	"Living for the City"	Eliminated
4	Lauri Tähkä	Kim Koskinen	"I Don't Want to Talk About It"	Advancing
5	Michael Monroe	Saara Aalto	"Over the Rainbow"	Advancing
6	Elastinen	Mikko Sipola	"Livin' on a Prayer"	Advancing
7	Michael Monroe	Mikko Herranen	"The Pretender"	Eliminated
8	Paula Koivuniemi	Aki Louhela	"When a Man Loves a Woman"	Eliminated

Semi-Final results

Team	Artist	Coach points	Spotify points	Public points	Total points	Result
Michael Monroe	Saara Aalto	70	44	46	160	Advancing to final
Michael Monroe	Mikko Herranen	30	56	54	140	Eliminated
Paula Koivuniemi	Jesse Kaikuranta	60	61	55	176	Advancing to final
Paula Koivuniemi	Aki Louhela	40	39	45	124	Eliminated
Lauri Tähkä	Kim Koskinen	55	60	82	197	Advancing to final
Lauri Tähkä	Amanda Löfman	45	40	18	103	Eliminated
Elastinen	Mikko Sipola	55	45	61	161	Advancing to final
Elastinen	Lauri Mikkola	45	55	39	139	Eliminated

==== Finale: April 20, 2012 ====
The four finalists each performed a cover song and an original song.

Competition performances

Performance Order	Coach	Contestant	Type	Song
1	Lauri Tähkä	Kim Koskinen	Cover	"Final Countdown"
2	Michael Monroe	Saara Aalto	Cover	"I'm Gonna Be Strong"
3	Elastinen	Mikko Sipola	Cover	"With or Without You"
4	Paula Koivuniemi	Jesse Kaikuranta	Cover	"Äiti"
5	Lauri Tähkä	Kim Koskinen	Original song	"Särkyneiden tie"
6	Michael Monroe	Saara Aalto	Original song	"My Love"
7	Elastinen	Mikko Sipola	Original song	"Stuck Inside My Head"
8	Paula Koivuniemi	Jesse Kaikuranta	Original song	"Vie mut kotiin"

Final results

– Winner
– Runner-up
– Second/Third runner-up

Artist	Team	Spotify points	Public points	Total points	Result
Mikko Sipola	Elastinen	28	32	60	Winner
Saara Aalto	Michael Monroe	26	29	55	First runner-up
Jesse Kaikuranta	Paula Koivuniemi	—	—	—	Second/Third runner-up
Kim Koskinen	Lauri Tähkä	—	—	—	Second/Third runner-up

=== Summaries ===
==== Results table ====
–	Contestant was saved by public's vote
–	Contestant was saved by coach's vote
–	Contestant was eliminated

===== Team Elastinen =====
Candidate	Battle 1	Battle 2	Battle 3	Battle 4	Show	Show	Show	Semi-Final	Final
Mikko Sipola	—	Safe	—	—					Winner
Lauri Mikkola	Safe	—	—	—				Eliminated	
Eveliina Tammenlaakso	—	—	Safe	—			Eliminated (Live Rounds: Week 5)		
Taru Ratilainen	—	—	Safe	—		Eliminated (Live Rounds: Week 4)			
Karoliina Kallio	—	—	—	Safe	Eliminated (Live Rounds: Week 2)				
Isabella Hammarsten	Safe	—	—	—	Eliminated (Live Rounds: Week 2)				
Lotta Lene	—	—	—	Eliminated (Battle 4)					
Pihla Knaapila	—	—	Eliminated (Battle 3)						
Siiri Nojonen	—	—	Eliminated (Battle 3)						
Laura Malmberg	—	Eliminated (Battle 2)							
Bettina Hammarsten	Eliminated (Battle 1)								
Henrika Ignatius	Eliminated (Battle 1)								

===== Team Lauri =====
Candidate	Battle 1	Battle 2	Battle 3	Battle 4	Show	Show	Show	Semi-Final	Final
Kim Koskinen	—	—	—	Safe					Final 4
Amanda Löfman	—	—	Safe	—				Eliminated	
Antti Matikainen	—	—	Safe	—			Eliminated (Live Rounds: Week 5)		
Sanna Säntti	—	Safe	—	—		Eliminated (Live Rounds: Week 3)			
Selja Felin	Safe	—	—	—	Eliminated (Live Rounds: Week 1)				
Valerie Nyholm	Safe	—	—	—	Eliminated (Live Rounds: Week 1)				
Ella Tukia	—	—	—	Eliminated (Battle 4)					
Mari Rautanen	—	—	—	Eliminated (Battle 4)					
Markku Kirves	—	—	Eliminated (Battle 3)						
Minna Lasanen	—	—	Eliminated (Battle 3)						
Jelena Knief	—	Eliminated (Battle 2)							
Heidi Akselin	Eliminated (Battle 1)								
Nelli Järvelä	Eliminated (Battle 1)								

===== Team Paula =====
Candidate	Battle 1	Battle 2	Battle 3	Battle 4	Show	Show	Show	Semi-Final	Final
Jesse Kaikuranta	—	Safe	—	—					Final 4
Aki Louhela	—	—	—	Safe				Eliminated	
Tanja Vähäsarja	Safe	—	—	—			Eliminated (Live Rounds: Week 5)		
Nelli Petro	—	Safe	—	—		Eliminated (Live Rounds: Week 4)			
Anfisa Proskuryakova	—	—	—	Safe	Eliminated (Live Rounds: Week 2)				
Sophie Aittola	—	—	Safe	—	Eliminated (Live Rounds: Week 2)				
Hanna Silander	—	—	—	Eliminated (Battle 4)					
Oskari Salovaara	—	—	—	Eliminated (Battle 4)					
Mia Renwall	—	—	Eliminated (Battle 3)						
Juho Räisänen	—	Eliminated (Battle 2)							
Minna Eskola	—	Eliminated (Battle 2)							
Johanna Mäkelä	Eliminated (Battle 1)								

===== Team Michael =====
Candidate	Battle 1	Battle 2	Battle 3	Battle 4	Show	Show	Show	Semi-Final	Final
Saara Aalto	—	Safe	—	—					First runner-up
Mikko Herranen	—	Safe	—	—				Eliminated	
Kimmo Härmä	Safe	—	—	—			Eliminated (Live Rounds: Week 5)		
Toni Hiltunen	—	—	—	Safe		Eliminated (Live Rounds: Week 3)			
JP Salo	—	—	—	Safe	Eliminated (Live Rounds: Week 1)				
Krista Siegfrids	—	—	Safe	—	Eliminated (Live Rounds: Week 1)				
Heini Särmäkari	—	—	—	Eliminated (Battle 4)					
Toni Eurasto	—	—	—	Eliminated (Battle 4)					
Mya Rydman	—	—	Eliminated (Battle 3)						
Anna Inginmaa	—	Eliminated (Battle 2)							
Tony Romeo	—	Eliminated (Battle 2)							
Ilmo Ylinärä	Eliminated (Battle 1)								

== See also ==
- The Voice (TV series)
- fi:The Voice of Finland
