= Mortal Mind Creation =

Studio album by Celesty
- Released: 23 October 2006
- Recorded: June–July 2006
- Studio: Martin Kantola Audio
- Genre: Symphonic power metal
- Length: 45:15
- Label: Dockyard 1 Records
- Producer: Arttu Volanto

Celesty chronology
Legacy of Hate (2004)	Mortal Mind Creation (2006)	Vendetta (2009)

Professional ratings
Review scores
Source	Rating
Metal Storm	8/10
Metal.de	5/10
Metalfan.nl	75/100
Rock Hard	6/10

Mortal Mind Creation is the third studio album by Finnish power metal band Celesty, released on 23 October 2006 via Dockyard 1 Records.

== Track listing ==
1. "Lord of Mortals" – 4:43
2. "Unreality" – 5:06
3. "Demon Inside" – 6:40
4. "War Creations" – 4:30
5. "Empty Room" – 5:23
6. "Among the Dreams" – 4:38
7. "Back in Time" – 4:08
8. "Arrival" – 4:43
9. "Last Sacrifice" – 5:24
10. "Final Pray" (bonus track) – 4:45

== Personnel ==
- Antti Railio – lead vocals
- Teemu Koskela – guitars
- Tapani Kangas – guitars
- Juha Mäenpää – keyboards, piano
- Ari Katajamäki – bass
- Jere Luokkamäki – drums, backing vocals
