= Legacy of Hate =

Studio album by Celesty
- Released: 10 May 2004
- Recorded: October 2003–March 2004
- Studios: Fantom Studio, Tampere, Finland
- Genre: Symphonic power metal
- Length: 55:22
- Label: Arise Records
- Producers: Samu Oittinen, Tapani Kangas, Jere Luokkamäki

Celesty chronology
Reign of Elements (2002)	Legacy of Hate (2004)	Mortal Mind Creation (2006)

Professional ratings
Review scores
Source	Rating
Metal Storm	9/10
Metalfan.nl	78/100
Rock Hard	7/10

Legacy of Hate is the second studio album by Finnish power metal band Celesty, released on 10 May 2004. The album has received positive feedback from reviewers, with some comparing it to Helloween, Sonata Arctica, Stratovarius, and Rhapsody of Fire.

== Track listing ==
1. "Intro" – 0:57
2. "Unbreakable" – 5:06
3. "Dream" – 4:44
4. "Breed from the Land Unknown" – 4:54
5. "Army of the Universe" – 6:50
6. "Settlement" – 6:38
7. "Shelter" – 4:53
8. "Legacy of Hate" – 21:20
  1. "Part I" – 10:35
    1. "Blood of Our Enemies"
    2. "Before the Sword"
    3. "Confused Thoughts"
    4. "Betrayal"
  2. "Part II" – 10:45
    1. "Battlefield"
    2. "The Departure"
    3. "Ride or Amardon"
    4. "Ending?"
9. "Wickedness Act" (bonus track) – 5:16

== Personnel ==
- Antti Railio – lead vocals
- J.P. Alanen – guitars
- Tapani Kangas – guitars, backing vocals
- Juha Mäenpää – keyboards
- Ari Katajamäki – bass
- Jere Luokkamäki – drums
