= Vendetta (Celesty album) =

Studio album by Celesty
- Released: 18 March 2009
- Recorded: 2008
- Studio: Fantom Studios
- Genre: Symphonic metal, power metal
- Length: 58:15
- Label: Spinefarm Records
- Producer: Samu Oittinen, Kalevi Olli

Celesty chronology
Mortal Mind Creation (2006)	Vendetta (2009)

Professional ratings
Review scores
Source	Rating
Dead Rhetoric	3.5/5
Metal Express Radio	8.5/10
Metal.de	7/10

Vendetta is the fourth and final studio album by Finnish power metal band Celesty, released on 18 March 2009 via Spinefarm Records. The album title was revealed on 24 December 2008, and the cover artwork was unveiled on 25 January 2009.

== Track listing ==
1. "Prelude for Vendetta" – 1:26
2. "Euphoric Dream" – 5:06
3. "Greed & Vanity" – 4:16
4. "Like Warriors" – 4:40
5. "Autumn Leaves" – 4:06
6. "Feared by Dawn" – 4:53
7. "Lord (of This Kingdom)" – 5:00
8. "New Sin" – 5:27
9. "Dark Emotions" – 5:16
10. "Fading Away" – 3:59
11. "Legacy of Hate Pt.3" – 14:06
  1. "Candlelight"
  2. "Shadow Land"
  3. "Chaos and Destruction"
  4. "Feelings"

== Personnel ==
- Antti Railio – lead vocals
- Teemu Koskela – guitars, backing vocals
- Tapani Kangas – guitars, acoustic guitar
- Juha Mäenpää – keyboards
- Ari Katajamäki – bass
- Jere Luokkamäki – drums
