= The Voice of Finland season 3 =

The Voice of Finland
- Season 3
- Hosted by: Axl Smith (host); Jenni Alexandrova (backstage reporter)
- Judges: Elastinen; Mira Luoti; Anne Mattila; Michael Monroe
- Winner: Siru Airistola
- Winning coach: Michael Monroe
- Runner-up: Emma Schnitt
- Finals venue: Logomo

Release
- Original network: Nelonen
- Original release: January 3 – April 18, 2014

Season chronology
- ← Previous; Season 2 Next → Season 4

The Voice of Finland (season 3) is the third season of the Finnish reality singing competition based on The Voice format. The season premiered on Nelonen on January 3, 2014.

The coaches are singer Anne Mattila, glam rock singer Michael Monroe, singer Mira Luoti of PMMP, and rapper Elastinen. Axl Smith hosts the program.

== Overview ==
The series consists of three phases: a blind audition, a battle phase, and live performance shows. Four judges/coaches, all noteworthy recording artists, choose teams of contestants through a blind audition process where the coaches cannot see, but only hear the auditioner. Each judge has the length of the auditioner's performance (about one minute) to decide if they want that singer on their team; if two or more judges want the same singer (as happens frequently), the singer has the final choice of coach. Some singers perform behind a curtain which falls only after the song is finished.

Each team of contestants is mentored and developed by its respective coach. In the second stage, called the battle phase, coaches have two of their team members battle against each other directly by singing the same song together, with the coach choosing which team member to advance from each of four individual "battles" into the first live round. This season, coaches are allowed to steal two eliminated artists each from other coaches.

In the final phase, the remaining contestants compete against each other in live broadcasts. Within the first live round, the surviving acts from each team again compete head-to-head, with public votes determining one of two acts from each team that will advance to the final eight, while the coach chooses which of the remaining acts comprises the other performer remaining on the team. The television audience and the coaches have equal say 50/50 in deciding who moves on to the semi-final. In the semi-final the results are based on a mix of public vote, advance vote by phone, sms, Deezer listening and Ruutu.fi viewing of the previous week's performances, and voting of coaches. Each carries equal weight of 100 points for a total of 300 points. With one team member remaining for each coach, the (final 4) contestants compete against each other in the finale with the outcome decided by advance vote and public vote, both with equal weight of 100 points for a total of 200 points.

All finalists will release a single and the winner will receive a record deal with Universal.

== Episodes ==
=== The Blind Auditions ===
Key	Coach hit his or her "I WANT YOU" button	Contestant eliminated with no coach pressing his or her "I WANT YOU" button	Contestant defaulted to this coach's team	Contestant elected to join this coach's team

==== Episode 1: January 3, 2014 ====
Order	Contestant	Song	Coaches' and Contestants' Choices			
Order	Contestant	Song	Elastinen	Mira Luoti	Anne Mattila	Michael Monroe
1	Emmi Ahonen	"Crazy"				—
2	Suvi Salmimies	"Paris (Ooh La La)"	—			
3	Juho Schroderus	"Someone Like You"				
4	Emma Schnitt	"One and Only"				
5	Lee Angel	"Heaven"				
6	Laura Saloniemi	"Prinsessalle"	—	—	—	—
7	Jussi Kivi	"Wake Me Up"	—	—		—
8	Hulda Jokinen	"Vanha nainen hunningolla"	—	—	—	—
9	Ronnie Grandell	"Born To Run"	—	—	—	—
10	Cecilia Strömman	"Jolene"	—			—
11	Roni Leppä	"Burning Love"	—	—	—	—
12	Janne Savolainen	"Polte"	—		—	—
13	Anni Saikku	"Stay"				

==== Episode 2: January 10, 2014 ====
Order	Contestant	Song	Coaches' and Contestants' Choices			
Order	Contestant	Song	Elastinen	Mira Luoti	Anne Mattila	Michael Monroe
1	Johanna Johnson	"I Never Loved a Man (The Way I Love You)"				
2	Miklos Jeney	"Iris"	—	—		—
3	Henri Potkonen	"Polte"	—	—		—
4	Ann Wikström	"I Remember You"	—	—	—	—
5	Toni Laaksonen	"Runaway"	—			
6	Veronika Sokolova	"Burn"	—	—	—	—
7	Ivone Kätkä	"Next To Me"			—	—
8	Elina Hjelt	"One and Only"	—	—		
9	Ville Pyykönen	"Home"	—	—		—
10	Sofia Tarkkanen	"I Gotta Find Peace of Mind"				—

==== Episode 3: January 17, 2014 ====
Order	Contestant	Song	Coaches' and Contestants' Choices			
Order	Contestant	Song	Elastinen	Mira Luoti	Anne Mattila	Michael Monroe
1	Maya Kurki	"Don't Let Go (Love)"		—	—	—
2	Sonja Perkkiö	"Crazy"	—	—	—	—
3	Jarmo Kantola	"Mustang Sally"	—	—		
4	Lauri Permanto	"The Scientist"	—		—	
5	Noora Mäkinen	"Wild Ones"	—	—	—	—
6	Kide Leppäpohja	"Because the Night"	—		—	
7	Satu Tolvanen	"Hurt"	—	—		—
8	Harry Fontana	"It's Only Make Believe"	—	—	—	—
9	Laura Perälä	"Kaksi mannerta"	—	—	—	—
10	Tiia Erämeri	"My Heart Is Refusing Me"				—

==== Episode 4: January 24, 2014 ====
Order	Contestant	Song	Coaches' and Contestants' Choices			
Order	Contestant	Song	Elastinen	Mira Luoti	Anne Mattila	Michael Monroe
1	Rami Välimäki	"Jos ystävään luottaa voit"	—	—	—	—
2	Anne Carlsson	"Säg det igen"			—	—
3	Orel Rantonen	"Superstition"	—	—		—
4	Meeri Paavilainen	"New York"	—	—		
5	Sari Kankkonen	"Footprints in the Sand"	—	—	—	—
6	Alexis Hjelt	"Broken Vow"			—	
7	Julia Väyrynen	"Blown Away"	—		—	—
8	Pia Lipponen	"Hallelujah"	—	—		
9	Oskari Salovaara	"Life on Mars?"	—	—	—	—
10	Camilla Bäckman	"Halo"				

==== Episode 5: January 31, 2014 ====
Order	Contestant	Song	Coaches' and Contestants' Choices			
Order	Contestant	Song	Elastinen	Mira Luoti	Anne Mattila	Michael Monroe
1	Kerttu Suonpää	"Fallin'"				—
2	Tuuli Okkonen	"Angel"	—			
3	Samuli Kakko	"Angels"	—	—	—	—
4	Mari Sarkkinen	"Blame It on the Boogie"	—	—		—
5	Timo Kanerva	"Take Me Home, Country Roads"	—	—		
6	Tuulia Raita	"Fix You"	—		—	—
7	Áile-Risten Holmberg	"Todella kaunis"	—	—	—	—
8	Netta Pietilä	"Warwick Avenue"				
9	Sini Alatalo	"You Had Me"	—	—		—
10	Kazumi Tanaka	"Fly Me to the Moon"				

==== Episode 6: February 7, 2014 ====
Order	Contestant	Song	Coaches' and Contestants' Choices			
Order	Contestant	Song	Elastinen	Mira Luoti	Anne Mattila	Michael Monroe
1	Laura Tuhkala	"Gravity"	—		—	
2	Erik Niemi	"Valerie"			—	—
3	Sami Ilvonen	"Highway to Hell"	—	—	—	—
4	Sanna Hannus	"Mä annan sut pois"	—	—		—
5	Teemu Alanen	"Iris"	—	—	—	—
6	Jemina Pouttu	"Homeless"	—			—
7	Vilikasperi Kanth	"Tuntematon potilas"	—	—	—	—
8	Maija Aflatuni	"Think"				
9	Siru Airistola	"Domino"	—	—		
10	Sini Tuominen	"Diamonds"		—	—	—

==== The Wildcards ====
Order	Contestant	Song	Coaches' and Contestants' Choices			
Order	Contestant	Song	Elastinen	Mira Luoti	Anne Mattila	Michael Monroe
1	Samuli Kakko	"Juuret"	—	—	—	—
2	Jenni Taari	"Listen"	—	—	—	—
3	Hulda Jokinen	"Hetken tie on kevyt"	—	—		—
4	Teemu Alanen	"Use Somebody"	—	—	—	—
5	Roni Leppä	"Unchained Melody"	—	—	—	
6	Alex Cast	"No Woman, No Cry"				

== Battle rounds ==
The Battle rounds will be broadcast over four episodes on February 14 - March 7, 2014. Each coach will be joined by an advisor, with Michael Monroe being joined by Eicca Toppinen of Apocalyptica, Mattila by producer Petri Munck, Mira Luoti will be joined by singer-songwriter Maija Vilkkumaa and Elastinen will be joined once again by producer Jukka Immonen. Each coach will be given two steals, they can hit their button as many times as they like, but can only steal two artists from other coaches.

Colour key

✔	Coach hit his/her "I WANT YOU" button
	Artist won the Battle and advanced to the Knockouts
	Artist lost the Battle but was stolen by another coach and advances to the Knockouts
	Artist lost the Battle and was eliminated

=== Episode 7 (February 14) ===
Order	Coach	Artists		Song	Coaches' and artists' choices			
Order	Coach	Artists		Song	Elastinen	Mira Luoti	Anne Mattila	Michael Monroe
1	Mira Luoti	Camilla Bäckman	Anne Carlsson	"I Say a Little Prayer"	✔	—N/a	—	✔
2	Michael Monroe	Meeri Paavilainen	Roni Leppä	"Hanging on the Telephone"	—	—	—	—N/a
3	Anne Mattila	Henri Potkonen	Ville Pyykönen	"Mandoliinimies"	—	—	—N/a	—
4	Elastinen	Tiia Erämeri	Emma Schnitt	"Skyscraper"	—N/a	✔	✔	✔
5	Michael Monroe	Sonja Perkkiö	Elina Hjelt	"I Drove All Night"	—	—	✔	—N/a
6	Anne Mattila	Jussi Kari	Satu Tolvanen	"Where the Wild Roses Grow"	—	—	—N/a	—

=== Episode 8 (February 21) ===
Order	Coach	Artists		Song	Coaches' and artists' choices			
Order	Coach	Artists		Song	Elastinen	Mira Luoti	Anne Mattila	Michael Monroe
1	Elastinen	Johanna Johnson	Maya Kurki	"And I Am Telling You I'm Not Going"	—N/a	✔	—	—
2	Anne Mattila	Miklos Jeney	Juho Schroderus	"Shape of My Heart"	—	—	—N/a	—
3	Elastinen	Sini Tuominen; Netta Pietilä	Emmi Ahonen	"Säännöt rakkaudelle"	—N/a	—	✔	—
4	Mira Luoti	Maija Aflatuni	Orel Rantonen	"That Don't Impress Me Much"	—	—N/a	—N/a	—
5	Michael Monroe	Lee Angel	Kide Leppäpohja	"Dancing in the Dark"	—	—	—N/a	—N/a
6	Anne Mattila	Hulda Jokinen	Sanna Hannus	"Oothan tässä vielä huomenna"	✔	—	—N/a	—

=== Episode 9 (February 28) ===
Order	Coach	Artists		Song	Coaches' and artists' choices			
Order	Coach	Artists		Song	Elastinen	Mira Luoti	Anne Mattila	Michael Monroe
1	Mira Luoti	Sofia Tarkkanen	Lauri Permanto	"Nuori ja kaunis"	—N/a	—N/a	—N/a	—
2	Michael Monroe	Jarmo Kantola	Timo Kanerva	"In the City"	—N/a	—	—N/a	—N/a
3	Anne Mattila	Jemina Pouttu	Toni Laaksonen	"9 to 5"	—N/a	—	—N/a	—
4	Elastinen	Kerttu Suonpää	Erik Niemi	"Let Her Go"	—N/a	—	—N/a	—
5	Mira Luoti	Julia Väyrynen	Tuulia Raita	"Still Into You"	—N/a	—N/a	—N/a	—
6	Michael Monroe	Siru Airistola	Kazumi Tanaka	"The World Is Stone"	—N/a	✔	—N/a	—N/a

=== Episode 10 (March 7) ===
Order	Coach	Artists		Song	Coaches' and artists' choices			
Order	Coach	Artists		Song	Elastinen	Mira Luoti	Anne Mattila	Michael Monroe
1	Elastinen	Anni Saikku	Ivone Kätkä	"Me ei olla enää me"	—N/a	—N/a	—N/a	✔
2	Mira Luoti	Tuuli Okkonen	Cecilia Strömman	"Häävalssi mollissa"	—N/a	—N/a	—N/a	—N/a
3	Anne Mattila	Sini Alatalo	Mari Sarkkinen	"One Day In Your Life"	—N/a	—N/a	—N/a	—N/a
4	Elastinen	Alexis Hjelt	Alex Cast	"The Reason"	—N/a	—N/a	—N/a	—N/a
5	Mira Luoti	Janne Savolainen	Laura Tuhkala	"Joka päivä ja joka ikinen yö"	—N/a	—N/a	—N/a	—N/a
6	Michael Monroe	Pia Lipponen	Suvi Salmimies	"Money Changes Everything"	—N/a	—N/a	—N/a	—N/a

== The Knockouts ==
Color key:

Artist won the Knockouts and advances to the Live shows
Artist lost the Knockouts and was eliminated

Episode & Date	Coach	Order	Song	Artists		Song
Episode 11 (March 14)	Elastinen	1	"Who's Lovin' You"	Erik Niemi	Alexis Hjelt	"Chasing Cars"
Episode 11 (March 14)	Michael Monroe	2	"Who Knew"	Elina Hjelt	Siru Airistola	"Nobody's Wife"
Episode 11 (March 14)	Mira Luoti	3	"Read All About It"	Camilla Bäckman	Laura Tuhkala	"Kun aika on"
Episode 11 (March 14)	Anne Mattila	4	"Feeling Good"	Netta Pietilä	Juho Schroderus	"Hiljaisuus"
Episode 11 (March 14)	Elastinen	5	"Undressed"	Sini Tuominen	Emma Schnitt	"Clarity"
Episode 12 (March 15)	Michael Monroe	1	"Fuckin' Perfect"	Suvi Salmimies	Roni Leppä	"Heaven In Your Eyes"
Episode 12 (March 15)	Mira Luoti	2	"Lonely Boy"	Sofia Tarkkanen	Maija Aflatuni	"Dream On"
Episode 12 (March 15)	Anne Mattila	3	"Pettävällä jäällä"	Ville Pyykönen	Hulda Jokinen	"Balladi"
Episode 12 (March 15)	Elastinen	4	"Skyfall"	Anne Carlsson	Johanna Johnson	"I Have Nothing"
Episode 12 (March 15)	Michael Monroe	5	"Sixteen Tons"	Jarmo Kantola	Lee Angel	"Walking The Dog"
Episode 12 (March 15)	Mira Luoti	6	"My Heart Will Go On"	Kazumi Tanaka	Maya Kurki	"Come Together"
Episode 13 (March 21)
Episode 13 (March 21)	Anne Mattila	1	"Breakeven"	Toni Laaksonen	Sini Alatalo	"Unbreak My Heart"
Episode 13 (March 21)	Elastinen	2	"Lumottu"	Sanna Hannus	Anni Saikku	"Make You Feel My Love"
Episode 13 (March 21)	Michael Monroe	3	"Qué hiciste"	Ivone Kätkä	Tiia Erämeri	"The Voice Within"
Episode 13 (March 21)	Mira Luoti	4	"Temporary Home"	Julia Väyrynen	Tuuli Okkonen	"Ingalsin Laura"
Episode 13 (March 21)	Anne Mattila	5	"Ride"	Jussi Kari	Sonja Perkkiö	"Unconditionally"

== Live shows ==
The live performance shows were broadcast live from Logomo, Turku between March 28 and April 18.

Cheek ft. Diandra, Antti Railio, and Ella Eyre performed during the quarterfinal shows, Redrama and Pauli Hanhiniemi performed in the semifinal. Paloma Faith and Sunrise Avenue performed during the final.

Colour key

Artist was saved by the Public's vote
Artist was saved by his/her coach
Artist was eliminated

=== Quarterfinal 1 (March 28) ===
Order	Coach	Artist	Song	Result
1	Elastinen	Johanna Johnson	"Stronger (What Doesn't Kill You)"	Eliminated
2	Anne Mattila	Jussi Kari	"High Hopes"	Public's vote
3	Elastinen	Anni Saikku	"As Long as You Love Me"	Eliminated
4	Anne Mattila	Ville Pyykönen	"Sua lemmin kuin järjetön ma oisin"	Eliminated
5	Elastinen	Erik Niemi	"Treasure"	Elastinen's vote
6	Anne Mattila	Sini Alatalo	"Frozen"	Eliminated
7	Elastinen	Emma Schnitt	"My Kind of Love"	Public's vote
8	Anne Mattila	Juho Schroderus	"Sorry Seems to Be the Hardest Word"	Anne's vote

=== Quarterfinal 2 (April 4) ===
Order	Coach	Artist	Song	Result
1	Mira Luoti	Sofia Tarkkanen	"Happy"	Mira's vote
2	Michael Monroe	Roni Leppä	"Billie Jean"	Eliminated
3	Mira Luoti	Maya Kurki	"Hollow Talk"	Eliminated
4	Michael Monroe	Lee Angel	"Duran Duran"	Eliminated
5	Mira Luoti	Tuuli Okkonen	"Tuomittu kulkemaan"	Public's vote
6	Michael Monroe	Tiia Erämeri	"If I Were a Boy"	Michael's vote
7	Mira Luoti	Camilla Bäckman	"Burn"	Eliminated
8	Michael Monroe	Siru Airistola	"I (Who Have Nothing)"	Public's vote

=== Semifinal (April 11) ===
Competition performances

Order	Coach	Artist	Song	Result
1	Michael Monroe	Tiia Erämeri	"At Last"	Eliminated
2	Anne Mattila	Juho Schroderus	"I Won't Hold You Back"	Eliminated
3	Mira Luoti	Sofia Tarkkanen	"Matkalla etelään"	Eliminated
4	Elastinen	Erik Niemi	"Lego House"	Eliminated
5	Michael Monroe	Siru Airistola	"All by Myself"	Advancing
6	Anne Mattila	Jussi Kari	"Under the Bridge"	Advancing
7	Mira Luoti	Tuuli Okkonen	"The Man with the Child in His Eyes"	Advancing
8	Elastinen	Emma Schnitt	"(You Make Me Feel Like) A Natural Woman"	Advancing

Semifinal results

Team	Artist	Coach points	Advance points	Public points	Total points	Result
Michael Monroe	Tiia Erämeri	40	39	37	116	Eliminated
Michael Monroe	Siru Airistola	60	61	63	184	Advancing to final
Anne Mattila	Juho Schroderus	40	56	46	142	Eliminated
Anne Mattila	Jussi Kari	60	44	54	158	Advancing to final
Mira Luoti	Sofia Tarkkanen	40	44	39	123	Eliminated
Mira Luoti	Tuuli Okkonen	60	56	61	177	Advancing to final
Elastinen	Erik Niemi	40	45	37	122	Eliminated
Elastinen	Emma Schnitt	60	55	63	178	Advancing to final

=== Final (April 18) ===
Competition performances

Each finalist performed an original song and a duet with their team coach.

Performance Order	Coach	Contestant	Type	Song	Result
1	Elastinen	Emma Schnitt	Duet	"Love the Way You Lie (Part II)" (with Elastinen)	Runner-up
2	Anne Mattila	Jussi Kari	Duet	"Pieni ja hento ote" (with Anne Mattila)	3rd-4th place
3	Mira Luoti	Tuuli Okkonen	Duet	"Kevät" (with Mira Luoti)	3rd-4th place
4	Michael Monroe	Siru Airistola	Duet	"Say Something" (with Michael Monroe)	Winner
5	Elastinen	Emma Schnitt	Solo	"Älä pelkää"	Runner-up
7	Anne Mattila	Jussi Kari	Solo	"Suu & Pää"	3rd-4th place
6	Mira Luoti	Tuuli Okkonen	Solo	"Pysähdytään Pariisiin"	3rd-4th place
8	Michael Monroe	Siru Airistola	Solo	"Sä et kulu pois"	Winner

Final results

– Winner
– Runner-up
– 3rd/4th place

Artist	Team	Advance points	Public points	Total points	Result
Siru Airistola	Michael Monroe	43	47	90	Winner
Emma Schnitt	Elastinen	33	34	67	Runner-up
Jussi Kari	Anne Mattila	—N/a	—N/a	—N/a	3rd/4th place
Tuuli Okkonen	Mira Luoti	—N/a	—N/a	—N/a	3rd/4th place

== Elimination Chart ==
=== Overall ===
Color key
Artist's info

- Team Michael
- Team Anne
- Team Mira
- Team Elastinen

Result details

- Winner
- Runner-up
- Third place
- Fourth place
- Artist was saved by the public
- Artist was saved by his/her coach
- Artist advanced to the finals
- Artist was eliminated
- Artist did not perform on that particular week

Live show results per week
Artist	Week 1	Week 2	Week 3	Finals	
Siru Airistola		Safe	Safe	Safe	Winner
Emma Schnitt	Safe		Safe	Safe	Runner-up
Jussi Kari	Safe		Safe	3rd place	Eliminated (Finals)
Tuuli Okkonen		Safe	Safe	3rd place	Eliminated (Finals)
Juho Schroderus	Safe		Eliminated	Eliminated (Week 3)	
Tiia Erämeri		Safe	Eliminated	Eliminated (Week 3)	
Erik Niemi	Safe		Eliminated	Eliminated (Week 3)	
Sofia Tarkkanen		Safe	Eliminated	Eliminated (Week 3)	
Camilla Bäckman		Eliminated	Eliminated (Week 2)		
Lee Angel		Eliminated	Eliminated (Week 2)		
Maya Kurki		Eliminated	Eliminated (Week 2)		
Roni Leppä		Eliminated	Eliminated (Week 2)		
Anni Saikku	Eliminated	Eliminated (Week 1)			
Johanna Johnson	Eliminated	Eliminated (Week 1)			
Sini Aratalo	Eliminated	Eliminated (Week 1)			
Ville Pyykönen	Eliminated	Eliminated (Week 1)			

== Reception and TV ratings ==
Season three premiered on January 3, 2014. The overall ratings appear to be in decline from the previous seasons. On weeks 6, 7, and 8 the program was competing against live broadcasts from the 2014 Winter Olympics from Sochi on Yle TV2. Week 9 saw the all time lowest rating for the program, when it was up against the TV premiere of a documentary film on legendary Finnish ice-hockey star Teemu Selänne on MTV3. Like on previous seasons, The Voice of Finland airs twice a week, first Friday evening at 8:00 pm and re-run on Sunday afternoon at 5:00 pm.

#	Episode	Original air date	Time	Rating on same day	Rating within 7 days
1	"Season 3 Premiere"	January 3, 2014	Friday 8:00pm		
2	"The Blind Auditions, Part 2"	January 10, 2014	Friday 8:00pm		
3	"The Blind Auditions, Part 3"	January 17, 2014	Friday 8:00pm		
4	"The Blind Auditions, Part 4"	January 24, 2014	Friday 8:00pm		
5	"The Blind Auditions, Part 5"	January 31, 2014	Friday 8:00pm	n/a	784,000
6	"The Blind Auditions, Part 6"	February 7, 2014	Friday 8:00pm	525,000	581,000
7	"The Battle, Part 1"	February 14, 2014	Friday 9:00pm	557,000	597,000
8	"The Battle, Part 2"	February 21, 2014	Friday 8:00pm	548,000	591,000
9	"The Battle, Part 3"	February 28, 2014	Friday 8:00pm	471,000	524,000
10	"The Battle, Part 4"	March 7, 2014	Friday 8:00pm	467,000	504,000
11	"Knockout 1"	March 14, 2014	Friday 8:00pm	548,000	588,000
12	"Knockout 2"	March 15, 2014	Saturday 8:00pm	n/a	n/a
13	"Knockout 3"	March 21, 2014	Friday 8:00pm	563,000	615,000
14	"Quarterfinal 1"	March 28, 2014	Friday 8:00pm	502,000	546,000
14	"Quarterfinal 2"	April 4, 2014	Friday 8:00pm	530,000	559,000
15	"Semifinal"	April 11, 2014	Friday 8:00pm	489,000	520,000
16	"Final"	April 18, 2014	Friday 8:00pm	520,000	539,000

Notes

- Rating is the average number of viewers during the program.
- The latest weekly ratings contain timeshift viewing only during the same day. Older weekly ratings contain timeshift viewing during seven days.

== See also ==
- fi:The Voice of Finland
