= Reign of Elements =

Studio album by Celesty
- Released: 2 December 2002
- Recorded: August 2002
- Studios: Fantom Studio, Tampere, Finland
- Genres: Power metal, speed metal
- Length: 42:32
- Label: Arise Records
- Producers: Samu Oittinen, Tapani Kangas, Jere Luokkamäki

Celesty chronology
Reign of Elements (2002)	Legacy of Hate (2004)

Professional ratings
Review scores
Source	Rating
Metalfan.nl	67/100
Rock Hard	5.5/10

Reign of Elements is the debut studio album by Finnish power metal band Celesty, released on 2 December 2002.

== Track listing ==
1. "Intro" – 0:35
2. "The Charge" – 5:06
3. "Revenge" – 4:54
4. "Sword of Salvation" – 5:25
5. "Reign of Elements" – 4:38
6. "Lost in Deliverance" – 6:03
7. "The Sword and the Shield" – 5:46
8. "Battle of Oblivion" – 4:46
9. "Kingdom" – 5:19
10. "Power of Stones" (bonus track) – 4:31

== Personnel ==
- Kimmo Perämäki – lead vocals
- J.P. Alanen – guitars, acoustic guitar
- Tapani Kangas – guitars, backing vocals
- Juha Mäenpää – keyboards, backing vocals
- Ari Katajamäki – bass
- Jere Luokkamäki – drums, backing vocals
