= Celesty =

- Origin: Seinäjoki, Finland
- Genres: Power metal; symphonic metal
- Years active: 1998–2012, 2015–2016
- Label: Spinefarm

Celesty was a Finnish power metal band from Seinäjoki, active from 1998 to 2012 and releasing four full-length albums. Their final album, Vendetta, peaked at 30th on the Official Finnish Charts in 2009. They briefly reformed in 2015 and 2016, notably playing a show at the Nummirock festival in 2016.

== Members ==
=== Final lineup ===
- Ari Katajamäki – bass (1998–2012, 2015–2016)
- Jere Luokkamäki – drums (1998–2012, 2015–2016)
- Tapani Kangas – guitar, rhythm guitar (1999–2010, 2015–2016)
- Kimmo Perämäki – vocals (2000–2003, 2015–2016)
- Juha Mäenpää – keyboard (2001–2012, 2015–2016)
- JP Alanen – guitar (2000–2005, 2015–2016)

=== Previous members ===
- Teemu Koskela – guitar (2005–2012)
- Timo Lepistö – guitar (1998–1999)
- Marika Kleemola – keyboard (1998–1999)
- Tommi Ritola – vocals (1998–1999)
- Jari Lehtola - guitar (1999)
- Antti Railio – vocals (2003–2009)
- Toni Turunen – vocals (2010–2012)

== Discography ==
=== Albums ===
- Reign of Elements (2002)
- Legacy of Hate (2004)
- Mortal Mind Creation (2006)
- Vendetta (2009)

=== Demos ===
- Warrior of Ice (2001)
- Times Before the Ice (2002)
