= Siru Airistola =

Finnish singer

- Also known as: Siru
- Born: 24 September 1987 (age 38); Vaasa, Ostrobothnia, Finland
- Genres: Pop
- Occupation: Singer/Artist
- Instruments: Vocals, piano
- Years active: 2014–present
- Label: Universal Music
- Website: sirumusic.fi

Siru Airistola (born 24 September 1987), known professionally as Siru, is a Finnish singer who won the third edition of The Voice of Finland in 2014. She competed in Uuden Musiikin Kilpailu 2015 with the song "Mustelmat" in an attempt to represent Finland in the Eurovision Song Contest 2015, but was eliminated in the second heat.

Siru's debut album Solmut was released in February 2015.

Siru writes music to other artists too. Siru's single Läpikulkumatkalla was a part of a campaigne "Koko Suomi Tanssii" in 2017. Siru released her newest single "The Light" in 2018. At the moment Siru is working on a new release which will be released in the beginning of 2019.

== Discography ==
=== Studio albums ===
- Your Impression (2013)
- Solmut (2015)

=== Singles ===
Year	Single	Peak positions (Finnish radio airplay chart)	Album
Year	Single	FIN	Album
2013	"Your Impression"	—	Non-album single(s)
2014	"Sä et kulu pois"	84	Solmut
2014	"Kaksi naista"	56	Solmut
2015	"Mustelmat"	—	Solmut
	"Vierekkäin"		
2016	"Läpikulkumatkalla"		
2018	"The Light"		
"—" denotes single that did not chart or was not released in that territory.

Awards and achievements
Preceded by Antti Railio	The Voice of Finland Winner; 2014	Succeeded by Miia Kosunen
