= Elonkerjuu =

Finnish folk rock band

Lauri Tähkä & Elonkerjuu
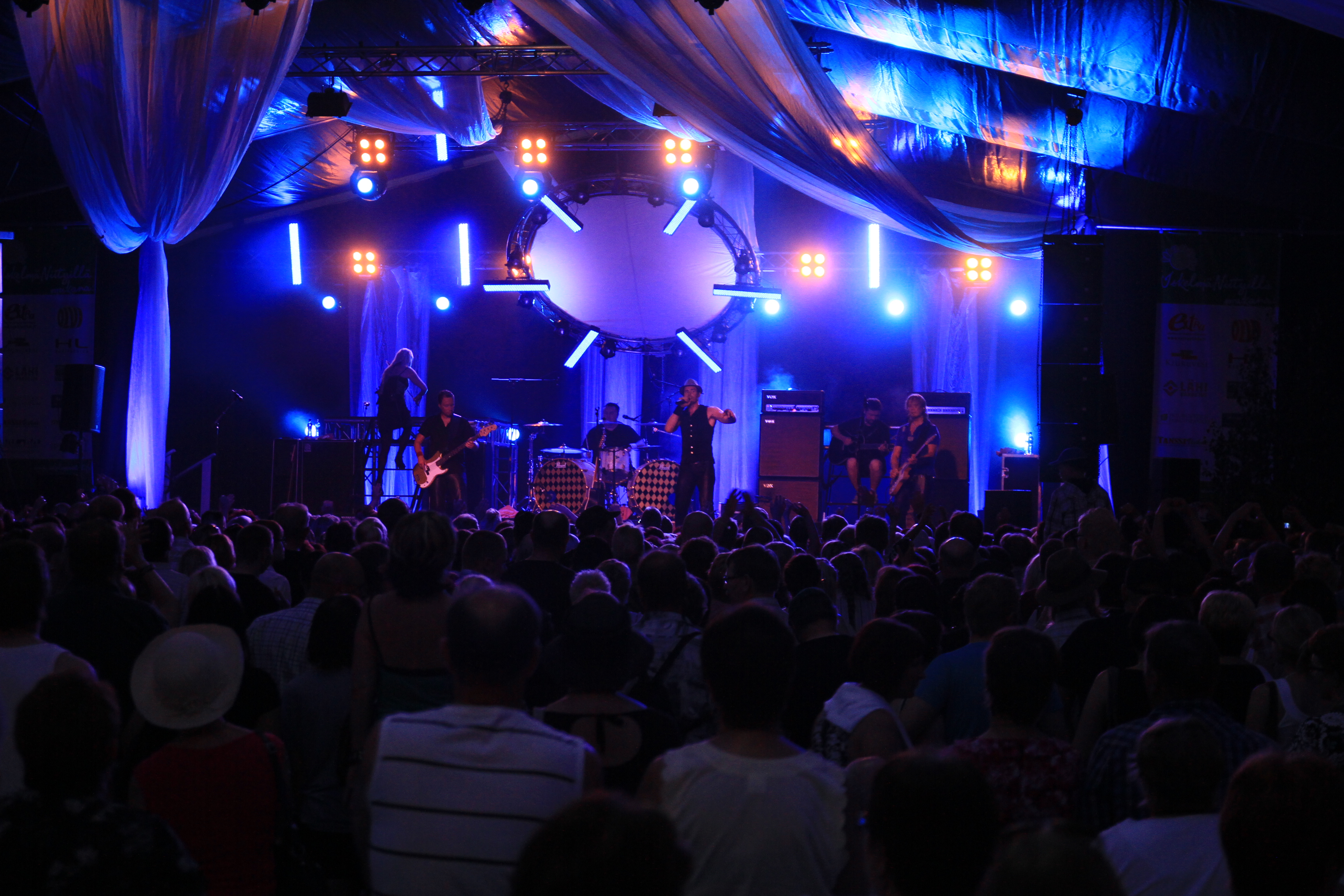
- Lauri Tähkä & Elonkerjuu performing at IskelmäNiityt in 2010

Background information
- Origin: Teuva, Finland
- Genres: Folk rock
- Years active: 1995–2011 (with Lauri Tähkä as lead); 2012–2017 (with Juha Lagström as lead); 2017–present (with Osku Ketola as lead)
- Labels: Universal Music Oy (2006–2011)
- Members: Simo Ralli; Lenni Paarma; Osku Ketola
- Past members: Juha Lagström; Johanna Koivu; Antero Naali; Lauri Tähkä
- Website: elonkerjuu.fi lauritahka.com

Elonkerjuu is a Finnish folk rock band. Lauri Tähkä founded the band in the mid-1990s and it was known from 1994 until 2011 as Lauri Tähkä & Elonkerjuu. They were signed since 2006 with Universal Music Finland. In 2011 Lauri Tähkä left the band and started his solo career. The band shortened their name to the current form. In 2012 Juha Lagström was chosen as the new lead singer. The current singer is Osku Ketola, who has been in the band since 2017.

== Lauri Tähkä and Elonkerjuu ==
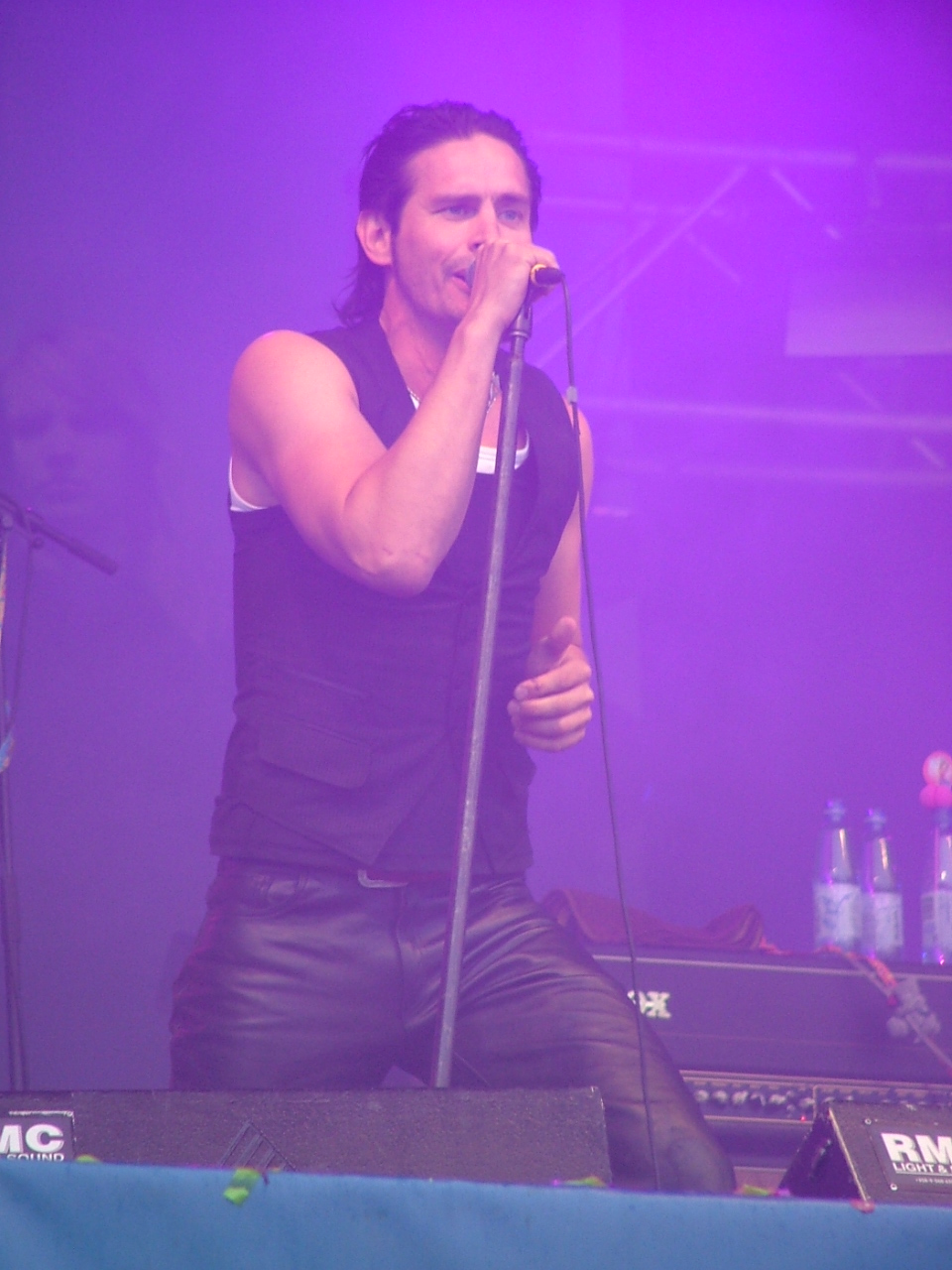
Lauri Tähkä with Elonkerjuu in 2008

During the first years, the band based its songs on traditional music from Southern Ostrobothnia. Later Lauri Tähkä composed their songs and wrote the lyrics.

Lauri Tähkä & Elonkerjuu 2006 album Maailma on renki went platinum. The next album, Tuhannen riemua got a gold record on the date of its publication, and double platinum in ten weeks. Until early 2008, that album has sold over 80,000 copies.

== Elonkerjuu ==
In March 2011 the singer Lauri Tähkä left the band and started solo career as the Lauri Tähkä. Later the rest of the band announced that they will continue under the name Elonkerjuu and in January 2012 Juha Lagström was chosen as their new vocalist. Johanna Koivu left the band on 2017 and Osku Ketola entered as a lead singer and a violinist.

The band's bassist, Antero Naali, died on 29 December 2023, at the age of 53.

== Discography ==
=== Albums ===
as Lauri Tähkä & Elonkerjuu

Year	Album	Record label	Peak positions	Certification
Year	Album	Record label	FIN	Certification
2001	Pistoja syrämmes	Little Big Records		
2002	Pistoja syrämmes (re-release)	Suomen Mediamusiikki		
2002	Komia on aina komia (re-release)	Suomen Mediamusiikki		
2004	Syntymähäjyt	Suomen Mediamusiikki / Saarnipuu Kustannus	4	
2006	Maailma on renki	Universal Music	4	
2007	Tuhannen riemua	Universal Music	1	
2008	Kirkkahimmat 2000-2008 (Compilation album)	Universal Music	1	
2009	Tänään ei huomista murehdita	Universal Music	1	
2010	Iholla (Live album)	Universal Music	5	

as Elonkerjuu

Year	Album	Record label	Peak positions	Album
Year	Album	Record label	FIN	Album
2012	Ilon pirstaleet	Sony Music Entertainment	1	
2014	Hehkuva rauta	Sony Music Entertainment	1	
2019	Xx	Elofest/Supersounds	19	

=== Singles ===
as Lauri Tähkä & Elonkerjuu

(Charting in The Official Finnish Charts)

Year	Album	Record label	Peak positions	Album
Year	Album	Record label	FIN	Album
2006	"Maailma on renki"	Universal Music Entertainment	1	
2007	"Hetkeksi en sulle rupia"	Universal Music Entertainment	1	
2007	"Pauhaava sydän"	Universal Music Entertainment	1	
2009	"Suudellaan "	Universal Music Entertainment	1	

Others (including promotional singles / EPs)

Year	Single	Record label
????	"Martinlunnin Jukka / Härmän häät" (promo)	Little Big Records
2000	Suukkoa vai puukkoa (EP)	Little Big Records
2001	"Ihana impi" / "Kruunun kahalehis"	Little Big Records
2002	"Mettumaari" / "Eerinjärven rannalla"	Suomen Mediamusiikki
2002	"Juomaripoika" / "Mennään pojat"	Suomen Mediamusiikki
2004	"Papukaija"	Suomen Mediamusiikki
2004	"Istu tyttöni polvelle" / "Tyttörukka" (promo)	Suomen Mediamusiikki
2005	"Piian nappula" (promo)	Edel Records Finland
2006	"Maailma on renki" / "Tytönhupakko"	Universal Music Finland
2006	"Rakkaus ei oo pysyvää" (promo)	Universal Music Finland
2006	"Pitkät pellot" (promo)	Universal Music Finland
2006	"Hyvästi"	Universal Music Finland
2007	"Hetkeksi en sulle rupia" / "Nuaren likan elämä" (live) / "Hyvästi" (live)	Universal Music Finland
2007	"Pauhaava sydän" (live) / "Hyvästi" (live)	Universal Music Finland
2007	"Kimpale kultaa" (promo)	Universal Music Finland
2008	"Rakasta rintani ruhjeille" (promo)	Universal Music Finland
2008	"Reikäinen taivas" (promo)	Universal Music Finland
2009	"Suudellaan" (promo)	Universal Music Finland
2009	"Kylkeen kyhnytä" (promo)	Universal Music Finland
2009	"Suojaan kaikelta" (promo)	Universal Music Finland
2010	"Rakasta mua" (promo)	Universal Music Finland
2010	"Taivas on tumma ja tahmee" (promo)	Universal Music Finland
2010	"Rakasta mua" (live) / "Sanoit että minäkin" (live) (promo)	Universal Music Finland

as Elonkerjuu

Year	Single	Record label
2012	"Viistäköön siipeni maata"	Sony Music Entertainment
2012	"Surun ja ilon kaupunki"	Sony Music Entertainment

=== DVDs ===
as Lauri Tähkä & Elonkerjuu

- 2007: Kerjuuvuodet 2000–2007

=== Videos ===
as Lauri Tähkä & Elonkerjuu

- 2000: Martinlunnin Jukka
- 2004: Papukaija
- 2006: Maailma on renki
- 2007: Pauhaava sydän
- 2008: Rakasta rintani ruhjeille
- 2009: Suudellaan
- 2009: Kylkeen kyhnytä
- 2010: Suojaan kaikelta

as Elonkerjuu

- 2012: Viistäköön siipeni maata
- 2012: Surun ja ilon kaupunki

== See also ==
- List of best-selling music artists in Finland
