= Antti Railio =

Finnish singer

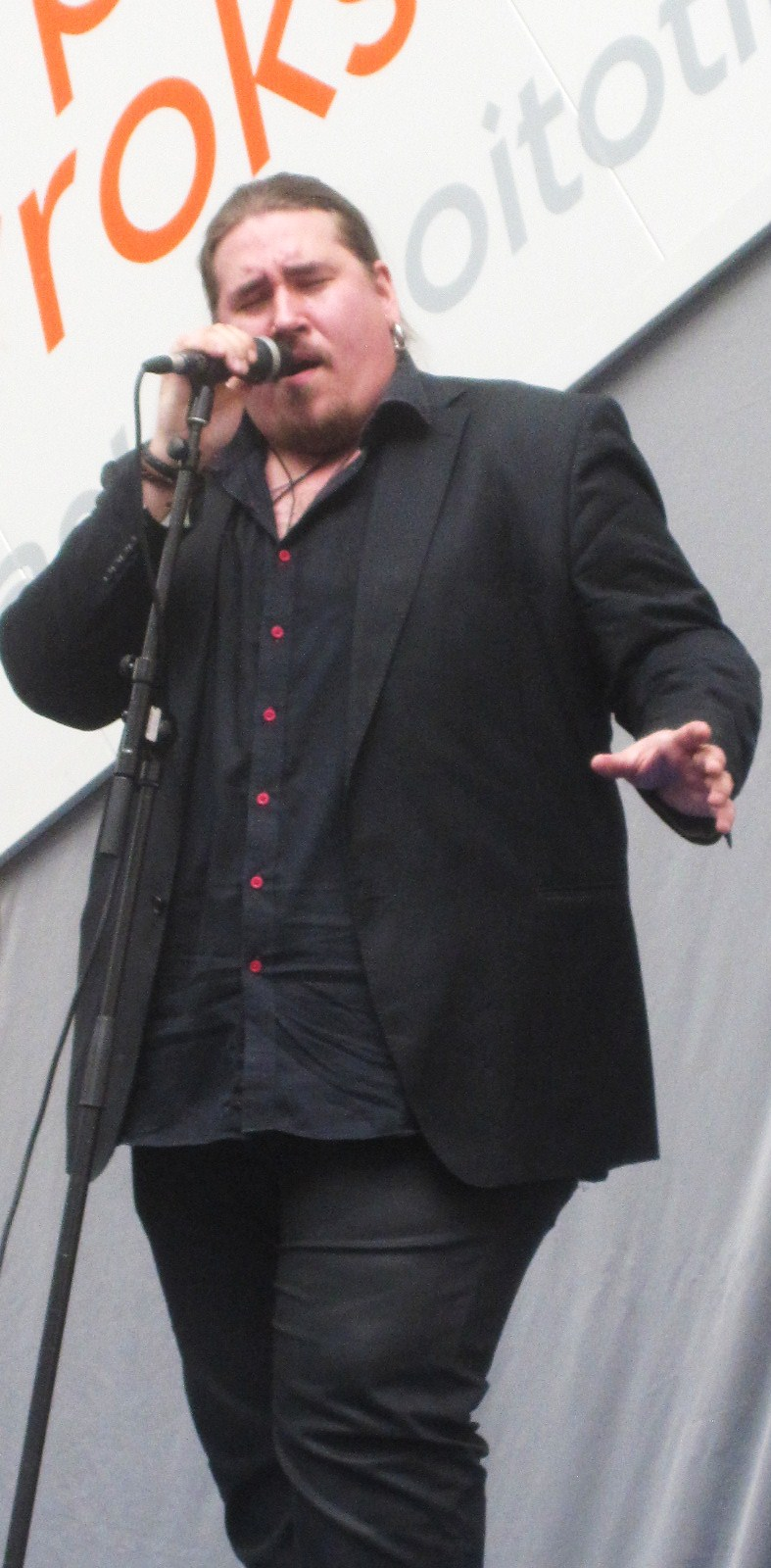
- Antti Railio in 2013

Background information
- Born: 1984 (age 40–41); Helsinki, Finland
- Genres: Rock; pop rock; soft rock; symphonic rock; hard rock; power metal; heavy metal; symphonic metal; thrash metal
- Occupations: Singer; songwriter
- Years active: 2003–present
- Website: anttirailio.fi

Antti Railio (born 1984) is a Finnish rock and pop rock singer who is a member of several bands, notably the power metal band Celesty, in addition to Diecell and The WildFire. After reaching the semi-finals in Finnish Idols (2007), and taking part in Kuorosota (Finnish version of Clash of the Choirs), he took part in season 2 of the Finnish music competition The Voice of Finland carrying the title in the final held on 26 April 2013.

== Career ==
Antti Railio started as a vocalist in the Finnish power metal band Celesty starting in 2003. During his six years in the band, Celesty released three albums, Legacy of Hate in 2004, Mortal Mind Creation in 2006 and Vendetta in 2009. He left the band just after the release of the album in 2009. While in Celesty, he also cooperated with band Diecell recording with them a demo, Audile Assault in 2005 and an EP Thrashborne in 2005.

In 2009, he moved to another band, The WildFire, releasing with them the album Sands of Time, a promotional album

=== Musical competitions and reality shows ===
Railio has been very active in music competition shows and reality television programmes. First he took part in season 3 of the Finnish version of Idols in 2007 reaching the semi-final stage before being eliminated.

In 2009, he was in the inaugural season of Kuorosota, the Finnish version of Clash of the Choirs. The series was won by Timo Kotipelto.

==== The Voice of Finland ====
In 2013, Railio returned to competition with The Voice of Finland which started on 4 January 2013 on the Finnish television Nelonen. He was the first contestant to appear on the show singing "Who Wants to Live Forever" from Queen. All four judges, Elastinen, Lauri Tähkä, Paula Koivuniemi and Michael Monroe turned their seats. Railio opted to be with Team Paula. In the Battle Rounds, Koivuniemi put him against Daniela Persson. Both sang "(I Just) Died in Your Arms" and Koivuniemi picked Railio to moved to the next round. In the live rounds starting on 15 March 2013, he sang consecutively "Maniac", "Rebel Yell", "Romanssi" and "Minun tuulessa soi" and in the semi-finals, "Skyfall" advancing to the finals as Team Paula finalist, alongside Suvi Aalto (Team Michael), Emilia Ekström (Team Lauri) and Ike Ikegwuonu (Team Elastinen). The final was aired 26 April 2013 singing "Sulava jää" as solo and "Kuuleeko yö" as a duo with his mentor Koivuniemi. He carried the title with a high score of 124 out of a possible 200, against runner up Ekström with just 76 out of 200.

=== Solo career ===
After his win, Railio embarked on a solo career. His debut single "Vieras maa" entered at #3 on Suomen virallinen lista, the official Finnish Singles Chart in its first week of release.

== Discography ==
=== Band appearances ===
- In Celesty – Legacy of Hate (2004) / Mortal Mind Creation (2006) / Vendetta (2009)
- In Diecell – Audile Assault (demo) (2005) / Thrashborne (EP) (2006)
- In Altaria – The Fallen Empire (backing vocals) (2006)
- In Beto Vázquez Infinity – Flying Towards A New Horizon / "Dreaming in Clouds" (2006)
- In Cain's Offering – Gather the Faithfull (backing vocals, choirs) (2009) / Stormcrow (backing vocals) (2015)
- In The WildFire – Sands of Time (Promo) (2011)
- In Christmas compilations
  - Raskasta Joulua (2013) – "Enkelikello" / "Tulkoon joulu"
  - Raskasta Joulua 2 (2014) – "Joulu juhla parahin"
  - Ragnarok Juletide (2014) – "We Celebrate at Christmastime" / "Christmas Has Come"
  - Tulkoon joulu – akustisesti (2015) – "Tulkoon joulu"
  - Raskasta Joulua IV (2017) – "Kuului laulu enkelten" / "Joulun rauhaa"
  - Live Hartwall Arena 2017 (2019)
  - Viides adventti (2022) – "Rakkain lahjoistani" / "Stars (Hear 'n Aid cover)" / "Kehtolaulu (Queensrÿche cover)"
- In Stratovarius – Eternal (vocals, choirs) (2015)
- In Lazy Bonez – Kiss of the Night / "Kiss of the Night" (2019)
- Jani Liimatainen – My Father's Son (2022) / "My Father's Son"
- In Mournful Lines – Love Is Cruel (2022)
- In Magnus Karlsson's Free Fall – Hunt the Flame / "Summoning the Stars" (2023)

=== Solo ===
==== Albums ====
- Vieras maa (2014, Universal Music)
- Mielenrauhaa (2019, Playground Music)
- Ikuisuus (2020, Playground Music)
- Haaveista Hulluuteen (2024, Gramofone Records Finland)

==== Singles ====
- "Ruostunut ankkuri" (2013)
- "Halla ja etelätuuli" (2013)
- "Kaiken muun saa viedä" (2014)
- "Samaan marmoriin" (2016)
- "Sun jälkeen routaa" (2019)
- "Mun sydän palaa sulle" (2020)
- "Jouluksi kotiin" (2021)
- "Vahvoja Sydämii" (2023)
- "Vielä Ollaan Täällä" (2024)
- "Haaveista Hulluuteen" (2024)

Awards and achievements
Preceded by Mikko Sipola	The Voice of Finland Winner; 2013	Succeeded by Siru Airistola
