= Lauri Tähkä =

Finnish musician and recording artist

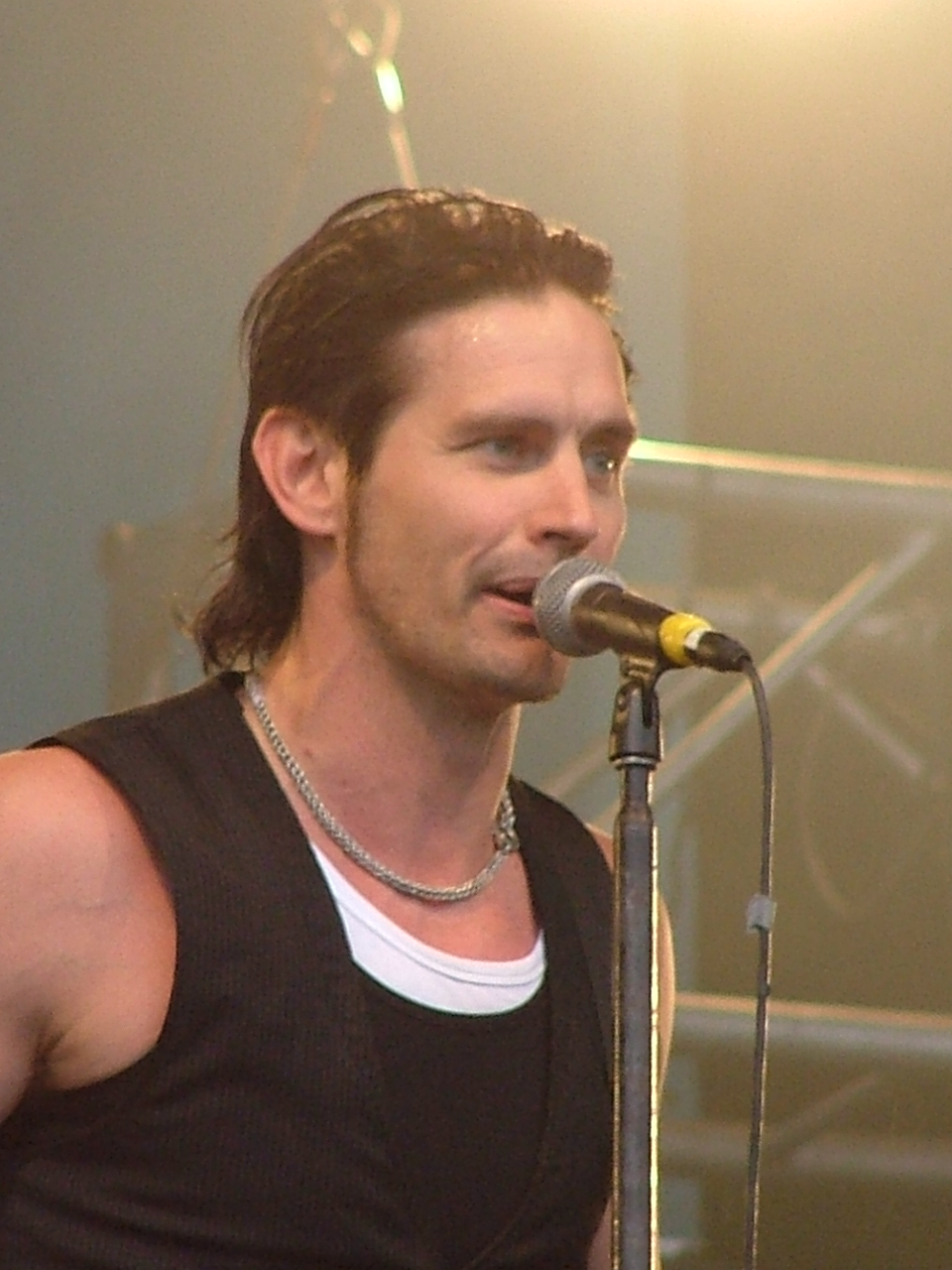

Background information
- Born: Jarkko Suo; November 9, 1973 (age 52); Vaasa, Finland
- Occupations: Singer, musician
- Instruments: Vocals, guitar, piano
- Years active: 1990–present
- Formerly of: Lauri Tähkä & Elonkerjuu
- Website: www.lauritahka.com

Jarkko Tapani Suo, professionally known as Lauri Tähkä (born November 9, 1973, in Vaasa, Finland), is a Finnish musician and recording artist. He was a leading member in the former band Lauri Tähkä & Elonkerjuu.

Growing up he listened to Kiss, Iron Maiden, the Finnish band Eppu Normaali, the works of Ismo Alanko as well as Kauko Röyhkä. Tähkä found his musical identity in a cross between rock and national ballads. With his cousin Simo Ralli he created "Niin kauan minä tramppaan" (I'll trek as long as), which won the "Lapuan Spelit" competition.

The Elonkerjuu band's home base was Teuva, Finland. Currently Lauri Tähkä is making a solo career. His first album, Polte, was released in October, 2011.

== Discography ==
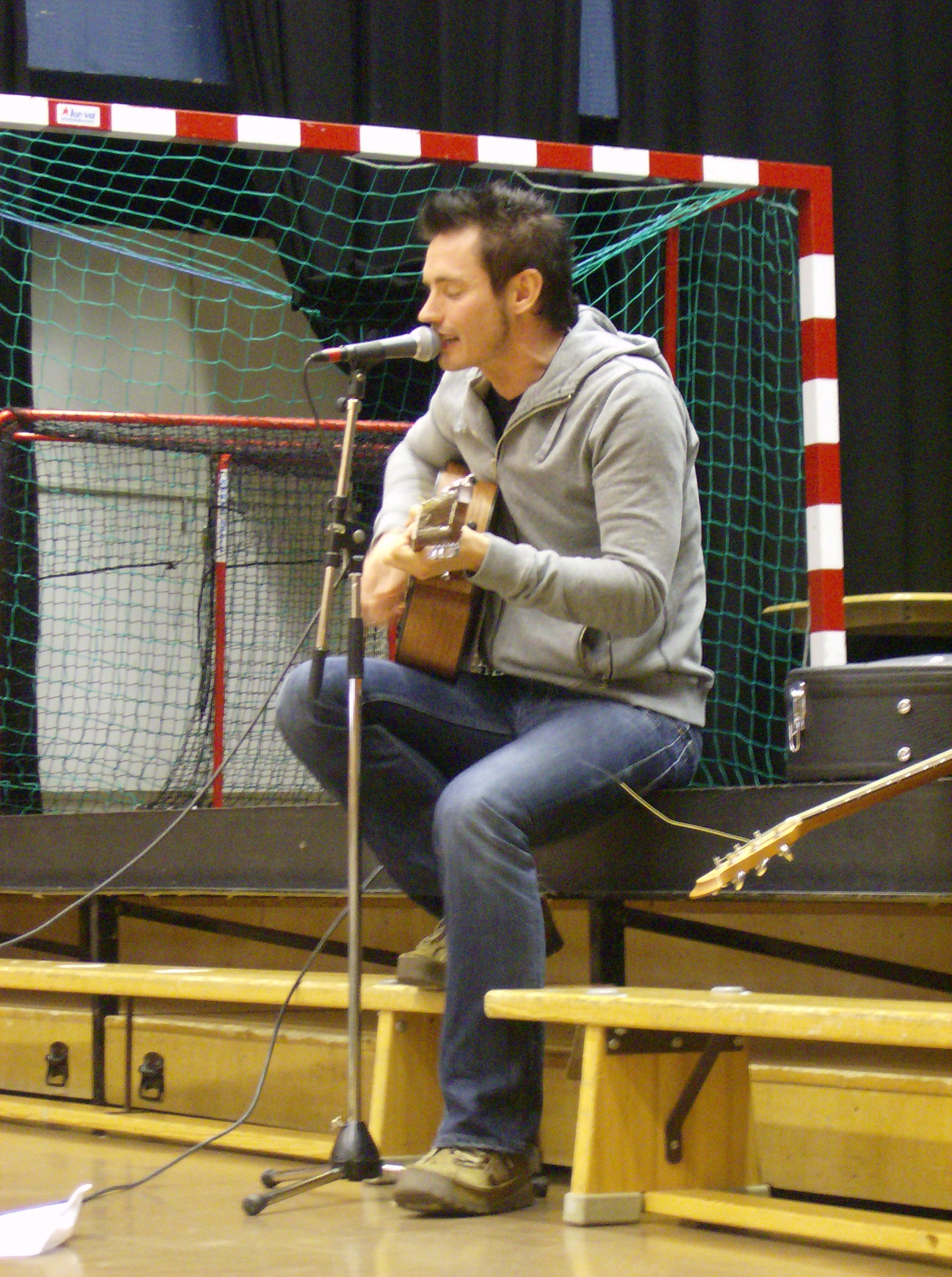
Lauri Tähkä at the Kauhava school concert in October 2007

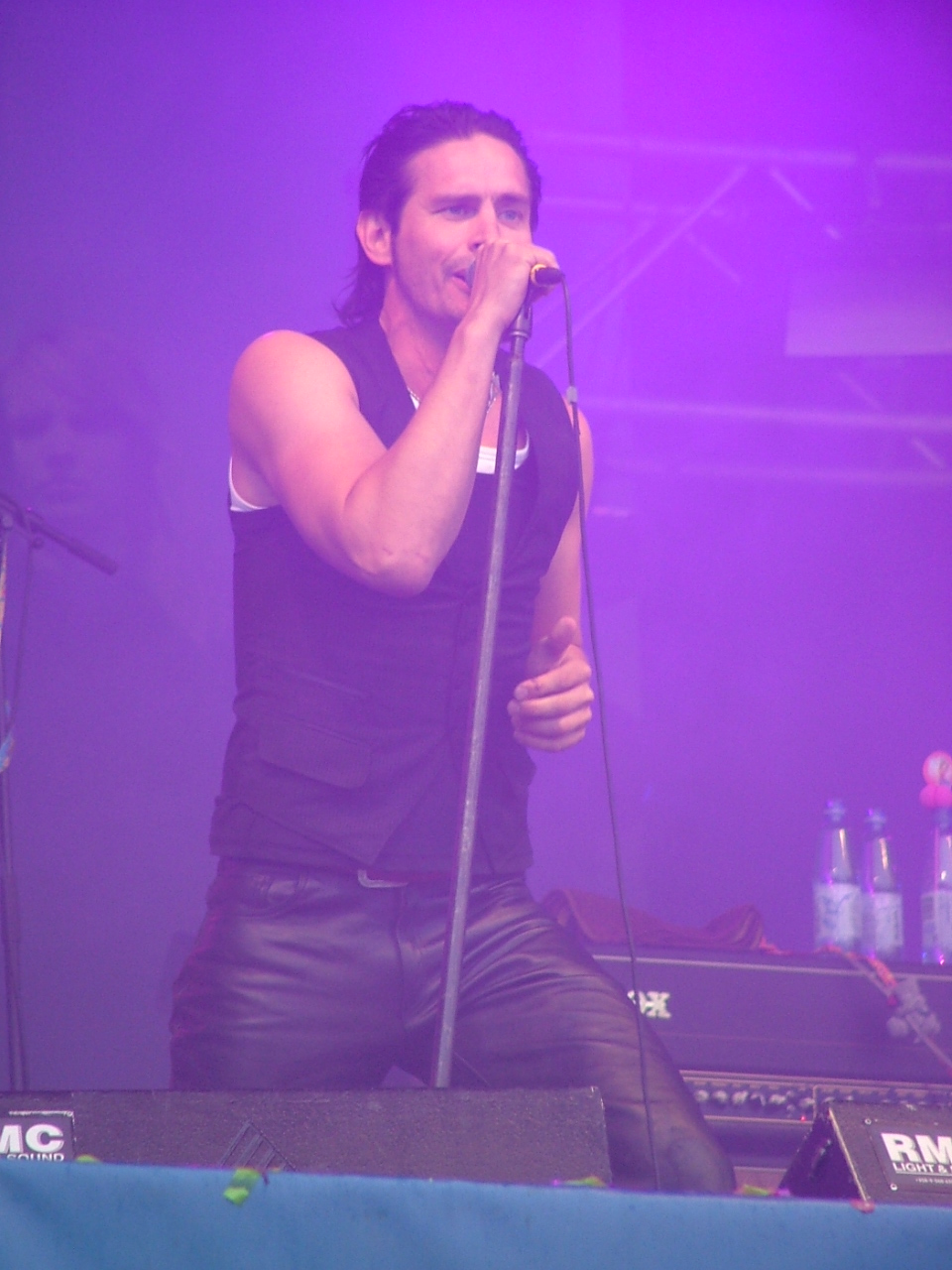
Lauri Tähkä with Elonkerjuu in 2008

(For albums and singles of Lauri Tähkä & Elonkerjuu, see discography of that article)

=== Albums ===
as Lauri Tähkä & Elonkerjuu

Year	Album	Record label	Peak positions	Certification
Year	Album	Record label	FIN	Certification
2001	Pistoja syrämmes	Little Big Records		
2002	Pistoja syrämmes (re-release)	Suomen Mediamusiikki		
2002	Komia on aina komia (re-release)	Suomen Mediamusiikki		
2004	Syntymähäjyt	Suomen Mediamusiikki / Saarnipuu Kustannus	4	
2006	Maailma on renki	Universal Music	4	
2007	Tuhannen riemua	Universal Music	1	
2008	Kirkkahimmat 2000-2008 (Compilation album)	Universal Music	1	
2009	Tänään ei huomista murehdita	Universal Music	1	
2010	Iholla (Live album)	Universal Music	5	

Solo albums

Year	Album	Peak positions	Certification
Year	Album	FIN	Certification
2011	Polte	2	
2013	Hurmaan	2	
2014	Jouluni laulut	10	
2016	Vien sut täältä kotiin	1	
2016	Polttavimmat	23	
2019	Meidän tulevat päivät	1	
2022	Kaikella on tarkoitus	1	

=== Singles ===
as Lauri Tähkä & Elonkerjuu (Charting in The Official Finnish Charts)

Year	Album	Record label	Peak positions	Album
Year	Album	Record label	FIN	Album
2006	"Maailma on renki"	Universal Music Entertainment	1	
2007	"Hetkeksi en sulle rupia"	Universal Music Entertainment	1	
2007	"Pauhaava sydän"	Universal Music Entertainment	1	
2009	"Suudellaan"	Universal Music Entertainment	1	

Others (including promotional singles / EPs)

Year	Single	Record label
????	"Martinlunnin Jukka / Härmän häät" (promo)	Little Big Records
2000	Suukkoa vai puukkoa (EP)	Little Big Records
2001	"Ihana impi" / "Kruunun kahalehis"	Little Big Records
2002	"Mettumaari" / "Eerinjärven rannalla"	Suomen Mediamusiikki
2002	"Juomaripoika" / "Mennään pojat"	Suomen Mediamusiikki
2004	"Papukaija"	Suomen Mediamusiikki
2004	"Istu tyttöni polvelle" / "Tyttörukka" (promo)	Suomen Mediamusiikki
2005	"Piian nappula" (promo)	Edel Records Finland
2006	"Maailma on renki" / "Tytönhupakko"	Universal Music Finland
2006	"Rakkaus ei oo pysyvää" (promo)	Universal Music Finland
2006	"Pitkät pellot" (promo)	Universal Music Finland
2006	"Hyvästi"	Universal Music Finland
2007	"Hetkeksi en sulle rupia" / "Nuaren likan elämä" (live) / "Hyvästi" (live)	Universal Music Finland
2007	"Pauhaava sydän" (live) / "Hyvästi" (live)	Universal Music Finland
2007	"Kimpale kultaa" (promo)	Universal Music Finland
2008	"Rakasta rintani ruhjeille" (promo)	Universal Music Finland
2008	"Reikäinen taivas" (promo)	Universal Music Finland
2009	"Suudellaan" (promo)	Universal Music Finland
2009	"Kylkeen kyhnytä" (promo)	Universal Music Finland
2009	"Suojaan kaikelta" (promo)	Universal Music Finland
2010	"Rakasta mua" (promo)	Universal Music Finland
2010	"Taivas on tumma ja tahmee" (promo)	Universal Music Finland
2010	"Rakasta mua" (live) / "Sanoit että minäkin" (live) (promo)	Universal Music Finland

Solo

Year	Singles	Peak positions	Album
Year	Singles	FIN	Album
2011	"Syyskuun kyy"	9	Polte
2011	"Polte"	6	Polte
2016	"Tämä rakkaus"	—	Vain elämää kausi 5
2016	"Kipua"	2	Vain elämää kausi 5
2019	"Palavaa vettä"	20	Meidän tulevat päivät
2019	"Blaablaa (En kuule sanaakaan)"	2	Vain elämää kausi 10
2019	"Liian kauan"	15	Vain elämää kausi 10
2021	"Aavikko"	3	
2021	"Keskiyön Cowboy"	13	
2022	"Nukkuvat aamut"	3	
2022	"Kaikella on tarkoitus"	20	
