= Paula Koivuniemi =

Finnish singer (born 1947)

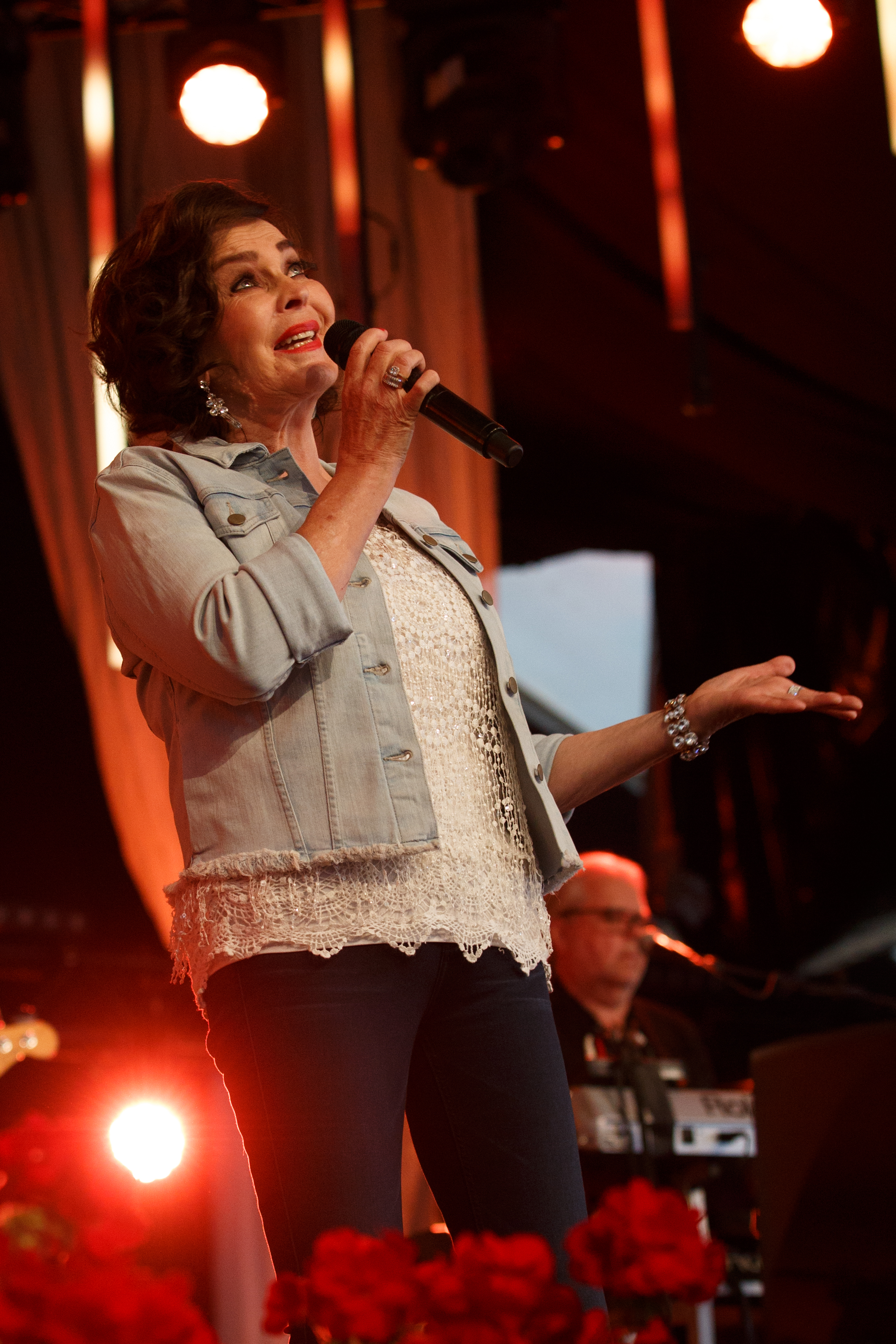
- Paula Koivuniemi in 2019

Background information
- Born: Paula Kristiina Koivuniemi; 19 June 1947 (age 78); Seinäjoki, Finland
- Instrument: Vocals
- Years active: 1966–present
- Website: www.paulakoivuniemi.fi

Paula Kristiina Koivuniemi (born 19 June 1947) is a Finnish singer who started her singing career in the 1960s. Koivuniemi released her first hit single "Perhonen" (Butterfly) in 1966. In the 1970s her career was in decline, but during the 1980s she had many hit singles in Finland – she received nine gold albums and one diamond album. During her career, Koivuniemi has sold over 345,000 certified records, which places her among the top 30 of best-selling soloists and top six of the best-selling female soloists in Finland.

== Discography ==
=== Albums ===
- Leikki riittää (1975 – The Game is Enough)
- Paula Koivuniemi (1977)
- Sinulle vain (1978 – Just for You)
- Lady Sentimental (1978)
- Vie minut pois (1980 – Take Me Away)
- Sata kesää, tuhat yötä (1981 – Hundred Summers, Thousand Nights)
- Luotan sydämen ääneen (1982 – I Trust in the Heart's Voice)
- Lähdetään (1983 – Let's Go)
- Rakkaustarina (1984 – Love Story)
- Ilman minua (1986 – Without Me)
- Hei Buonanotte (1987 – Hi, Buonanotte)
- Sen siksi tein (1989 – Resistiré)
- Täyttä elämää (1991 – Full Life)
- Rakkaudella sinun (1993 – Tenderly Yours)
- Se kesäni mun (1994 – That Summer of Mine)
- Tulisielu (1996 – Fire Soul)
- Kuuntelen Tomppaa (1999 – I Listen to Tomppa)
- Rakastunut (2003 – Fallen in Love)
- Yöperhonen (2006 – Moth)
- Timantti (2007 – Diamond)
- Nainen (2009 – Woman)
- Rakkaudesta (2010)
- Matka (2012)
- Kun joulu on (2013)
- Duetot (2016)

=== Collections ===
- 20 toivottua laulua (1987)
- Paula Koivuniemi (1988)
- Santa Maria – hitit 1983–90 (1990)
- Sinulle vain (1991)
- Suomen parhaat (1993)
- 20 suosikkia – Perhonen (1995)
- Parhaat (Valitut palat) (1996)
- 20 suosikkia – Aikuinen nainen (1997)
- 20 suosikkia – Kuuleeko yö (1998)
- Kaikki parhaat (Musiikin mestareita) (2001)
- Suuret sävelet (2001)
- Nostalgia (2005)
- 40 unohtumatonta laulua (2006)
- Lauluja rakkaudesta (2006)

== See also ==
- List of best-selling music artists in Finland
