= Anthem =

Song of celebration used as a symbol for a specific group

An anthem is a musical composition of celebration, usually used as a symbol for a distinct group, particularly the national anthems of countries. Originally, and in music theory and religious contexts, it also refers more particularly to short sacred choral work (still frequently seen in Sacred Harp and other types of shape note singing) and still more particularly to a specific form of liturgical music. In this sense, its use began c. 1550 in English-speaking churches; it uses English language words, in contrast to the originally Roman Catholic 'motet' which sets a Latin text.

== Etymology ==
Anthem is derived from the Greek ἀντίφωνα (antíphōna) via Old English antefn. Both words originally referred to antiphons, a call-and-response style of the singing. The adjectival form is "anthemic".

== History ==
Anthems were originally a form of liturgical music. In the Church of England, the rubric appoints them to follow the third collect at morning and evening prayer. Several anthems are included in the British coronation service. The words are selected from Holy Scripture or in some cases from the Liturgy and the music is generally more elaborate and varied than that of psalm or hymn tunes. Being written for a trained choir rather than the congregation, the Anglican anthem is analogous to the motet of the Catholic and Lutheran Churches but represents an essentially English musical form. Anthems may be described as "verse", "full", or "full with verse", depending on whether they are intended for soloists, the full choir, or both. Another way of describing an anthem is that it is a piece of music written specifically to fit a certain accompanying text, and it is often difficult to make any other text fit that same melodic arrangement. It also often changes melody and/or meter, frequently multiple times within a single song, and is sung straight through from start to finish, without repeating the melody for following verses like a normal song (although certain sections may be repeated when marked). An example of an anthem with multiple meter shifts, fuguing, and repeated sections is "Claremont", or "Vital Spark of Heav'nly Flame". Another well known example is William Billing's "Easter Anthem", also known as "The Lord Is Risen Indeed!" after the opening lines. This anthem is still one of the more popular songs in the Sacred Harp tune book.

The anthem developed as a replacement for the Catholic "votive antiphon" commonly sung as an appendix to the main office to the Blessed Virgin Mary or other saints.

=== Notable composers of liturgical anthems: historic context ===
During the Elizabethan period, notable anthems were composed by Thomas Tallis, William Byrd, Tye, and Farrant but they were not mentioned in the Book of Common Prayer until 1662 when the famous rubric "In quires and places where they sing here followeth the Anthem" first appears. Early anthems tended to be simple and homophonic in texture, so that the words could be clearly heard. During the 17th century, notable anthems were composed by Orlando Gibbons, Henry Purcell, and John Blow, with the verse anthem becoming the dominant musical form of the Restoration. In the 18th century, famed anthems were composed by Croft, Boyce, James Kent, James Nares, Benjamin Cooke, and Samuel Arnold. In the 19th century, Samuel Sebastian Wesley wrote anthems influenced by contemporary oratorio which stretch to several movements and last twenty minutes or longer. Later in the century, Charles Villiers Stanford used symphonic techniques to produce a more concise and unified structure. Many anthems have been written since then, generally by specialists in organ music rather than composers, and often in a conservative style. Major composers have usually written anthems in response to commissions and for special occasions: for instance Edward Elgar's 1912 "Great is the Lord" and 1914 "Give unto the Lord" (both with orchestral accompaniment); Benjamin Britten's 1943 "Rejoice in the Lamb" (a modern example of a multi-movement anthem, today heard mainly as a concert piece); and, on a much smaller scale, Ralph Vaughan Williams's 1952 "O Taste and See" written for the coronation of Queen Elizabeth II. With the relaxation of the rule, in England at least, that anthems should only be in English, the repertoire has been greatly enhanced by the addition of many works from the Latin repertoire.

== Types ==
The word "anthem" is commonly used to describe any celebratory song or composition for a distinct group, as in national anthems. Further, some songs are artistically styled as anthems, whether or not they are used as such, including Marilyn Manson's "Irresponsible Hate Anthem", Silverchair's "Anthem for the Year 2000", and Toto's "Child's Anthem".

=== National anthem ===
A national anthem (also state anthem, national hymn, national song, etc.) is generally a patriotic musical composition that evokes and eulogizes the history, traditions, and struggles of a country's people, recognized either by that state's government as the official national song, or by convention through use by the people. The majority of national anthems are marches or hymns in style. The countries of Latin America, Central Asia, and Europe tend towards more ornate and operatic pieces, while those in the Middle East, Oceania, Africa, and the Caribbean use a simpler fanfare. Some countries that are devolved into multiple constituent states have their own official musical compositions for them (such as with the United Kingdom, Russian Federation, and the former Soviet Union); their constituencies' songs are sometimes referred to as national anthems even though they are not sovereign states.

=== Flag anthem ===
"Zhōnghuá Míngúo Gúoqígē"
The Taiwanese flag anthem "Zhōnghuá Míngúo Gúoqígē"; formerly the flag anthem of China until 1949.

A flag anthem is generally a patriotic musical composition that extols and praises a flag, typically one of a country, in which case it is sometimes called a national flag anthem. It is often either sung or performed during or immediately before the raising or lowering of a flag during a ceremony. Most countries use their respective national anthems or some other patriotic song for this purpose. However, some countries, particularly in South America, use a separate flag anthem for such purposes. Not all countries have flag anthems. Some used them in the past but no longer do so, such as Iran, China, and South Africa. Flag anthems can be officially codified in law, or unofficially recognized by custom and convention. In some countries, the flag anthem may be just another song, and in others, it may be an official symbol of the state akin to a second national anthem, such as in Taiwan.

=== Sports anthem ===
Many pop songs are used as sports anthems, notably including Queen's "We Are the Champions" and "We Will Rock You", and some sporting events have their own anthems, most notably including UEFA Champions League.

=== Corporate anthem ===
Since the 20th century, corporations' senior management have written and performed corporate anthems in an attempt to motivate workers and explain company values. They are most often screened during private conferences, intended only to be heard by workers and sometimes company sponsors.

In 1937, IBM released a collection of 100 "happy songs" for IBM corporate gatherings. Each song borrowed tunes from existing music, with lyrics altered to fit the goals and personages of IBM. For example, an ode to IBM president Thomas J. Watson was sung to the tune of Auld Lang Syne:

T. J. Watson - you're our leader fine, the greatest in the land,

We sing your praises from our hearts - we're here to shake your hand.

You're I. B. M.'s bright guiding star throughout the hemispheres,

No matter what the future brings, we all will persevere.

In 1971, Japanese jazz singer Martha Miyake the Polydor Orchestra performed the "Song of Fujitsu". The song, intended as a karaoke sing-along, failed to entice employees because not many of them could read sheet music.

During a conference in January 1984, Apple screened "We Are Apple (Leading the Way)" to celebrate the rollout of Macintosh 128K. It was screened during a corporate presentation, intended to be viewed only by authorized Apple dealers and retailers.

In 2003, the University of Warwick reported the lack of efficacy and potential for ridicule:

While sing-along marching songs, as used by Wal Mart, [sic] induce positive feeling and happiness, so help control employee behaviour, songs are also used subversively to provide resistance to work. In fact, many 'official' songs are received with cynicism by employees, or even result in embarrassment.

Although songs or music can help branding and team building, a number of company songs, especially those in the style of Gospel anthems, such as 'Ahh Fujitsu', inspire dysfunction amongst employees...

Without control over the placement and timing of anthems, company music runs the risk of ridicule. For example, KPMG's anthemic, but now cringe worthy, [sic] 'Vision of Global strategy' was copied in mp3 format by employees, remixed, and distributed on the net.

On February 24, 2005, at Seattle Convention Center's Starbucks Licensed Stores Awards, Starbucks senior management surprised the audience by coming out in "rock 'n' roll costumes" with inflatable instruments to perform a parody of Jefferson Starship's 1985 "We Built This City", as "We Built This Starbucks". When the audience failed to dance, the emcee "berated them", and the employees "half-heartedly got up and just stood there". Although footage of the event is presumed to be lost, a recording was uploaded to YouTube in 2018, which alleged that a souvenir CD with the MP3 was gifted to attendees.

=== Shared anthems ===
Although anthems are used to distinguish states and territories, there are instances of shared anthems. "Nkosi Sikelel' iAfrika" became a pan-African liberation anthem and was later adopted as the national anthem of five countries in Africa including Zambia, Tanzania, Namibia and Zimbabwe after independence. Zimbabwe and Namibia have since adopted new national anthems. Since 1997, the South African national anthem has been a hybrid song combining new English lyrics with extracts of "Nkosi Sikelel' iAfrika" and the former state anthem "Die Stem van Suid-Afrika".

For North and South Korea, the folk song "Arirang" is considered a shared anthem for both countries. For example, it was played when the two Koreas marched together during the 2018 Winter Olympics.

"Hymn to Liberty" is the longest national anthem in the world by length of text. In 1865, the first three stanzas and later the first two officially became the national anthem of Greece and later also that of the Republic of Cyprus.

"Forged from the Love of Liberty" was composed as the national anthem for the short-lived West Indies Federation (1958–1962) and was adopted by Trinidad and Tobago when it became independent in 1962.

"Esta É a Nossa Pátria Amada" is the national anthem of Guinea-Bissau and was also the national anthem of Cape Verde until 1996.

"Oben am jungen Rhein", the national anthem of Liechtenstein, is set to the tune of "God Save the King/Queen". Other anthems that have used the same melody include "Heil dir im Siegerkranz" (Germany), "Kongesangen" (Norway), "My Country, 'Tis of Thee" (United States), "Rufst du, mein Vaterland" (Switzerland), "E Ola Ke Alii Ke Akua" (Hawaiʻi), and "The Prayer of Russians".

The Estonian anthem "Mu isamaa, mu õnn ja rõõm" is set to a melody composed in 1848 by Fredrik (Friedrich) Pacius which is also that of the national anthem of Finland: "Maamme" ("Vårt Land" in Swedish). It is also considered to be the ethnic anthem for the Livonian people with lyrics "Min izāmō, min sindimō" ("My Fatherland, my native land").

"Hey, Slavs" is dedicated to Slavic peoples. Its first lyrics were written in 1834 under the title "Hey, Slovaks" ("Hej, Slováci") by Samuel Tomášik and it has since served as the ethnic anthem of the Pan-Slavic movement, the organizational anthem of the Sokol physical education and political movement, the national anthem of Yugoslavia and the transitional anthem of the State Union of Serbia and Montenegro. The song is also considered to be the second, unofficial anthem of the Slovaks. Its melody is based on Mazurek Dąbrowskiego, which has also been the anthem of Poland since 1926, but the Yugoslav variation is much slower and more accentuated.

Between 1991 and 1994 "Deșteaptă-te, române!" was the national anthem of both Romania (which adopted it in 1990) and Moldova, but in the case of the latter it was replaced by the current Moldovan national anthem, "Limba noastră". Between 1975 and 1977, the national anthem of Romania "E scris pe tricolor Unire" shared the same melody as the national anthem of Albania "Himni i Flamurit", which is the melody of a Romanian patriotic song "Pe-al nostru steag e scris Unire".

The modern national anthem of Germany, "Das Lied der Deutschen", (Note: Translates from German as "The Song of the Germans".) uses the same tune as the 19th- and early 20th-century Austro-Hungarian imperial anthem "Gott erhalte Franz den Kaiser". (Note: Translates from German as "God save Emperor Francis".)

The "Hymn of the Soviet Union", (Note: Russian: Государственный гимн СССР; transliterated as Gosudarstvenniy Gimn SSSR.) was used until its dissolution in 1991, and was given new words and adopted by the Russian Federation in 2000 to replace an instrumental national anthem that had been introduced in 1990.

"Bro Gozh ma Zadoù", the regional anthem of Brittany and, "Bro Goth Agan Tasow", the Cornish regional anthem, are sung to the same tune as that of the Welsh de-facto national anthem "Hen Wlad Fy Nhadau", with similar words.

=== For parts of countries ===
"Marcha de Zacatecas"
The "Marcha de Zacatecas", the regional anthem of the Mexican state of Zacatecas.

"Surudi Milli"
Tajikistan's national anthem "Surudi Milli", the tune of which was previously used in the regional anthem of the Tajik Soviet Socialist Republic during that entity's existence.

"God Save the King/Queen"
Unlike Wales, England does not have an officially-designated regional anthem. Thus, the UK's national anthem "God Save the King" (or "God Save the Queen") is typically used as a de facto regional anthem for England on occasions requiring the use of one.

"Gi Talo Gi Halom Tasi"
"Gi Talo Gi Halom Tasi", the regional anthem of the Northern Mariana Islands.

"La Borinqueña"
"La Borinqueña", the regional anthem of Puerto Rico.

"Virgin Islands March"
The "Virgin Islands March", the regional anthem of the US Virgin Islands.

"Bože pravde"
"Bože pravde", the regional anthem of Serbia when it was a part of Serbia and Montenegro. It is now the national anthem of Serbia after it became an independent country in 2006.

Some countries, such as the former Soviet Union, Spain, and the United Kingdom, among others, are held to be unions of several "nations" by various definitions. Each of the different "nations" may have their own anthem and these songs may or may not be officially recognized; these compositions are typically referred to as regional anthems though may be known by other names as well (e.g. "state songs" in the United States).

==== Austria ====
In Austria, the situation is similar to that in Germany. The regional anthem of Upper Austria, the "Hoamatgsang" (English: "Chant of the Homeland"), is notable as the only (official) German-language anthem written and sung entirely in dialect.

==== Belgium ====
In Belgium, Wallonia uses "Le Chant des Wallons" and Flanders uses "De Vlaamse Leeuw".

==== Brazil ====
Most of the Brazilian states have official anthems. Minas Gerais uses an adapted version of the traditional Italian song "Vieni sul mar" as its unofficial anthem. During the Vargas Era (1937–1945) all regional symbols including anthems were banned, but they were legalized again by the Eurico Gaspar Dutra government.

==== Canada ====
The Canadian province of Newfoundland and Labrador, having been the independent Dominion of Newfoundland before 1949, also has its own regional anthem from its days as a dominion and colony of the UK, the "Ode to Newfoundland". It was the only Canadian province with its own anthem until 2010, when Prince Edward Island adopted the 1908 song "The Island Hymn" as its provincial anthem.

==== Czechoslovakia ====
Czechoslovakia had a national anthem composed of two parts, the first verses of the Czech and Slovak anthems. After the dissolution of Czechoslovakia, the anthem split as well, but Slovakia added an extra verse.

==== Germany ====
In Germany, many of the Länder (states) have their own anthems, some of which predate the unification of Germany in 1871. A prominent example is the Hymn of Bavaria, which also has the status of an official anthem (and thus enjoys legal protection). There are also several unofficial regional anthems, like the "Badnerlied" and the "Niedersachsenlied".

==== India ====
Some of the states and union territories of India have officially adopted their own state anthem for use during state government functions.

==== Japan ====
As of 2025, forty-four of the forty-seven prefectures of Japan have one or more official prefectural songs.

The only prefectures that do not have a prefectural song are Osaka, Hiroshima and Ōita. However, all except Ōita have unofficial prefectural songs, and all three have official prefectural sports songs. It is sometimes believed that Hyōgo does not have an official prefectural song, but the song "Hyōgo Kenminka" (兵庫県民歌) was adopted in 1947.

In many prefectures, an official "prefectural song" (都道府県歌, todōfuken-ka), or "prefectural residents' song" (都道府県民歌, todōfukenmin-ka), is played alongside the raising of the prefectural flag at government-hosted events. In addition to the official prefectural song, several other songs that symbolize the prefecture—such as sports-themed songs or image songs representing the local identity—have often been adopted.

Regarding official prefectural songs, there are a variety of cases: some songs trace their origins to shōka (school songs) used in education during the mid-Meiji period; others were created after the end of World War II under encouragement from the General Headquarters of the Allied Forces (GHQ/SCAP); still others were composed in or after the 1980s. However, the most common pattern—seen in prefectures like Toyama and Aichi—is songs that were established in conjunction with the National Sports Festival, just like their prefectural flags.

Some songs, such as Nagano Prefecture's "Shinano no Kuni" (信濃の国), are so well-known that it is considered natural for residents to be able to sing them. However, there are also many examples where even local residents are not very familiar with their prefecture's song. Prefectural songs are mainly performed at events hosted by the prefectural government or during the National Sports Festival, but in some cases, they are also used as internal chimes to signal the start and end of work at prefectural offices, or as telephone hold music or ringtone melodies.

In Japan, many municipalities (cities, towns, and villages) under each prefecture also have their own official municipal songs (市町村歌, shichōson-ka). In addition, many of the special wards of Tokyo and the administrative wards of government-designated cities have established their own ward songs (区歌, kuka).

==== Malaysia ====
All the individual states of Malaysia have their own anthems.

==== Mexico ====
In Mexico, after the national anthem was established in 1854, most of the states of the federation adopted their own regional anthems, which often emphasize heroes, virtues or particular landscapes. In particular, the regional anthem of Zacatecas, the "Marcha de Zacatecas", is one of the more well-known of Mexico's various regional anthems.

==== Serbia and Montenegro ====
In 2004 and 2005 respectively, the Montenegrin and Serbian regions of Serbia and Montenegro adopted their own regional anthems. When the two regions both became independent sovereign states in mid-2006, their regional anthems became their national anthems.

==== Soviet Union ====
Fourteen of the fifteen constituent states of the Soviet Union had their own official song which was used at events connected to that region, and also written and sung in that region's own language. The Russian Soviet Federative Socialist Republic used the Soviet Union's national anthem as its regional anthem ("The Internationale" from 1917 to 1944 and the "National Anthem of the Soviet Union" from 1944 to 1990) until 1990, the last of the Soviet constituent states to do so. After the Soviet Union disbanded in the early 1990s, some of its former constituent states, now sovereign nations in their own right, retained the melodies of their old Soviet-era regional anthems until replacing them or, in some cases, still use them today.

Unlike most national anthems, few of which were composed by renowned composers, the Soviet Union's various regional anthems were composed by some of the best Soviet composers, including world-renowned Gustav Ernesaks (Estonia), Aram Khachaturian (Armenia), Otar Taktakishvili (Georgia), and Uzeyir Hajibeyov (Azerbaijan).

The lyrics present great similarities, all having mentions to Vladimir Lenin (and most, in their initial versions, to Joseph Stalin, the Armenian and Uzbek anthems being exceptions), to the guiding role of the Communist Party of the Soviet Union, and to the brotherhood of the Soviet peoples, including a specific reference to the friendship of the Russian people (the Estonian, Georgian and Karelo-Finnish anthems were apparently an exception to this last rule).

Some of the Soviet regional anthems' melodies can be sung in the Soviet Union anthem lyrics (Ukrainian and Belarus are the most fitted in this case).

Most of these regional anthems were replaced with new national ones during or after the dissolution of the Soviet Union; Belarus, Kazakhstan (until 2006), Tajikistan, Turkmenistan (until 1997), and Uzbekistan kept the melodies, but with different lyrics. Russia itself had abandoned the Soviet hymn, replacing it with a tune by Glinka. However, with Vladimir Putin coming to power, the old Soviet tune was restored, with new lyrics written to it.

Like the hammer and sickle and red star, the public performance of the anthems of the Soviet Union's various regional anthems the national anthem of the Soviet Union itself are considered as occupation symbols as well as symbols of totalitarianism and state terror by several countries formerly either members of or occupied by the Soviet Union. Accordingly, Latvia, Lithuania, Hungary, and Ukraine have banned those anthems amongst other things deemed to be symbols of fascism, socialism, communism, and the Soviet Union and its republics. In Poland, dissemination of items which are "media of fascist, communist, or other totalitarian symbolism" was criminalized in 1997. However, in 2011 the Constitutional Tribunal found this sanction to be unconstitutional. In contrast to this treatment of the symbolism, promotion of fascist, communist and other totalitarian ideology remains illegal. Those laws do not apply to the anthems of Russia, Belarus, Uzbekistan, Kazakhstan, and Tajikistan which used the melody with different lyrics.

==== Spain ====
In Spain, the situation is similar to that in Austria and Germany. Unlike the national anthem, most of the anthems of the autonomous communities have words. All are official. Three prominent examples are "Els Segadors" of Catalonia, "Eusko Abendaren Ereserkia" of the Basque Country, and "Os Pinos" of Galicia, all written and sung in the local languages.

==== United Kingdom ====
The United Kingdom's national anthem is "God Save the King" but its constituent countries and Crown Dependencies also have their own equivalent songs which have varying degrees of official recognition. England, Scotland, Wales, and Northern Ireland each have anthems which are played at occasions such as sports matches and official events.

- England - "God Save the King" is usually presumed to be, and often played as, the English regional anthem; but "Jerusalem", "I Vow To Thee, My Country" and "Land of Hope and Glory" are also sung. "Jerusalem" is used as England's anthem at the Commonwealth Games.
- Scotland variously uses "Flower of Scotland", "Auld Lang Syne", and "Scotland the Brave" as its unofficial national anthems. "Flower of Scotland" is used as Scotland's anthem at the Commonwealth Games and international football and rugby matches.
- Wales has sung "Hen Wlad Fy Nhadau" since 1856 when it was written by father and son Evan and James James. The music and a Breton translation, "Bro Gozh ma Zadoù", were adopted by Brittany as its anthem; and there is also a Cornish version, "Bro Goth agan Tasow", sung alongside "Trelawney" as an unofficial Cornish anthem. In Wales, "Hen Wlad fy Nhadau" is sometimes accompanied by the hymn, "Guide Me, O thou Great Redeemer" (also referred to as "Bread of Heaven" from repeated words in its first verse), especially at rugby matches.
- Northern Ireland currently uses "God Save the King" as its anthem at international football matches and uses "Danny Boy/Londonderry Air" at the Commonwealth Games.

The Isle of Man, a Crown dependency, uses "God Save the King" as a Royal anthem, but also has its own local anthem, "O Land of Our Birth" (Manx: "O Halloo Nyn Ghooie").

==== United States ====
Although the United States has "The Star-Spangled Banner" as its official national anthem, all except two of its constituent states and territories also have their own regional anthem (referred to by most US states as a "state song"), along with Washington, DC. The two exceptions are New Jersey, which has never had an official state song, and Maryland, which rescinded "Maryland, My Maryland" in 2021 due to its racist language and has yet to adopt a replacement. Virginia's previous state song, "Carry Me Back to Old Virginny", adopted in 1940, was later rescinded in 1997 due to its racist language by the Virginia General Assembly. In 2015, "Our Great Virginia" was made the new state song of Virginia.

The state songs are selected by each state legislature, and/or state governor, as a symbol (or emblem) of that particular US state.

Some US states have more than one official state song, and may refer to some of their official songs by other names; for example, Arkansas officially has two state songs, plus a state anthem, and a state historical song. Tennessee has the most state songs, with 12 official state songs and an official bicentennial rap.

Arizona has a song that was written specifically as a state anthem in 1915, as well as the 1981 country hit "Arizona", which it adopted as the alternate state anthem in 1982.

Two individuals, Stephen Foster, and John Denver, have written or co-written two state songs. Foster's two state songs, "Old Folks at Home" (better known as "Swanee Ribber" or "Suwannee River"), adopted by Florida, and "My Old Kentucky Home" are among the best-known songs in the US On March 12, 2007, the Colorado Senate passed a resolution to make Denver's trademark 1972 hit "Rocky Mountain High" one of the state's two official state songs, sharing duties with its predecessor, "Where the Columbines Grow". On March 7, 2014, the West Virginia Legislature approved a resolution to make Denver's "Take Me Home, Country Roads" one of four official state songs of West Virginia. Governor Earl Ray Tomblin signed the resolution into law on March 8, 2014. Additionally, Woody Guthrie wrote or co-wrote two state folk songs – Roll On, Columbia, Roll On and Oklahoma Hills – but they have separate status from the official state songs of Washington and Oklahoma, respectively.

==== Yugoslavia ====
In Yugoslavia, each of the country's constituent states (except for Bosnia and Herzegovina) had the right to have its own anthem, but only the Croatian one actually did so initially, later joined by the Slovene one on the brink of the breakup of Yugoslavia. Before 1989, Macedonia did not officially use a regional anthem, even though one was proclaimed during World War II by the Anti-fascist Assembly for the National Liberation of Macedonia (ASNOM).

=== International organizations ===
Larger entities also sometimes have anthems, in some cases known as 'international anthems'. Lullaby is the official anthem of UNICEF composed by Steve Barakatt. "The Internationale" is the organizational anthem of various socialist movements. Before March 1944, it was also the anthem of the Soviet Union and the Comintern. ASEAN Way is the official anthem of ASEAN. The tune of the "Ode to Joy" from Beethoven's Symphony No. 9 is the official anthem of the European Union and of the Council of Europe. "Let Us All Unite and Celebrate Together" is the official anthem of the African Union

The Olympic Movement also has its own organizational anthem. Esperanto speakers at meetings often use the song "La Espero" as their linguistic anthem. The first South Asian Anthem by poet-diplomat Abhay K may inspire SAARC to come up with an official SAARC Anthem.

"Ireland's Call" was commissioned as the sporting anthem of both the Ireland national rugby union team and the Ireland national rugby league team, which are composed of players from both jurisdictions on the island of Ireland, in response to dissatisfaction among Northern Ireland unionists with the use of the Irish national anthem. "Ireland's Call" has since been used by some other all-island bodies.

An international anthem also unifies a group of organizations sharing the same appellation such as the International Anthem of the Royal Golf Clubs composed by Steve Barakatt. Same applies to the European Broadcasting Union: the prelude of Te Deum in D Major by Marc-Antoine Charpentier is played before each official Eurovision and Euroradio broadcast. The prelude's first bars are heavily associated with the Eurovision Song Contest.

=== Global anthem ===
Various artists have created "Earth anthems" for the entire planet, typically extolling the ideas of planetary consciousness. Though UNESCO have praised the idea of a global anthem, the United Nations has never adopted an official song.

== See also ==
- Antiphon
- List of national anthems
- Motet
- Stadium anthems
- Verse anthem

== Bibliography ==
- Baynes, T. S., ed. (1878), "Anthem" , Encyclopædia Britannica, vol. 2 (9th ed.), New York: Charles Scribner's Sons, p. 102
- Chisholm, Hugh, ed. (1911), "Anthem" , Encyclopædia Britannica, vol. 2 (11th ed.), Cambridge University Press, p. 93
