= 1852 in music =

== Events ==
- March 24 – First performance of Fredrik Pacius' opera Kung Karls jakt, the first to be composed in Finland, in Helsinki with a Swedish language libretto by Zachris Topelius.
- May 15 – Teatro Comunale Alighieri, the opera house in Ravenna, is inaugurated with a production of Meyerbeer's Robert le diable followed by Giovanni Pacini's Medea.
- Michael William Balfe sets off for Danzig to visit his daughter.
- Charles Gounod improvises a melody over the C major Prelude from Book 1 of Bach's Well Tempered Clavier. It is published the next year as 'Méditation sur le Premier Prélude de Piano de S. Bach' later to be known as Ave Maria.
- Franz Liszt conducts a performance of the 1838 opera Benvenuto Cellini by Hector Berlioz at Weimar. This revives the French composer's career which has been stagnant.
- The earliest known performance of Wagner's music in the United States takes place as an arrangement of one of the finales from Tannhäuser is performed by the Germania Musical Society conducted by Carl Bergmann.

== Popular music ==
- Stephen Foster – "Massa's in de Cold Cold Ground"
- S.M. Grannis – "Do They Miss Me At Home?" (lyrics by Carolina A.Mason)
- John Howson – "Christmas Present Polka"
- Gustav Reichardt – "Des Deutschen Vaterland" (words by Ernst Moritz Arndt)
- author unknown
  - "Norah and Dermot"
  - "Lundu"

== Classical music ==
- Johannes Brahms – Piano Sonata No. 2
- Matteo Carcassi – Etudes, Op.60
- Niels Gade – Symphony No.5, Op.25
- Mikhail Glinka – Mazurka in C major
- Stefano Golinelli – 24 Preludes, Op.69
- Alfred Jaell – Reminiscences sur 'Norma', Op.20
- Theodore Kirchner – 20 Piano Pieces, Op.2
- Franz Liszt
  - Valse-Impromptu
  - Fantasie und Fuge über den Choral Ad nos, ad salutarem undam, S.259
- Joachim Raff – Zwei Lieder with words by Gotthold Logau
- Luigi Ricci – Tarantella Napoletana from the opera "La Festa di Piedigrotta".
- Robert Schumann - Requiem Op. 148
- Johann Strauss, Jr.
  - Orakel-Sprüche Walzer, Op. 90
  - Maskenfest-Quadrille, Op. 92
  - Kaiser-Jäger-Marsch, Op. 93
  - Rhadamantus-Klänge Walzer, Op. 94
  - Promenade-Quadrille, Op. 98
  - Frauenkäferln Walzer, Op. 99
  - Vöslauer Polka, Op. 100
  - Mephistos Höllenrufe Walzer, Op. 101
  - Albion-Polka, Op. 102
  - Vivat! Quadrille, Op. 103
  - Windsor-Klänge Walzer, Op. 104
  - 5 Paragraphe aus dem Walzer Codex, Op. 105
  - Harmonie-Polka, Op. 106
  - Großfürsten-Marsch, Op. 107
  - Die Unzertrennlichen Walzer, Op. 108
  - Tête-à-Tête-Quadrille, Op. 109
  - Elektro-magnetische Polka, Op. 110
  - Blumenfest-Polka, Op. 111
  - Melodien-Quadrille, Op. 112
  - Sachsen-Kürassier-Marsch, Op. 113
  - Liebes-Lieder Walzer, Op. 114
  - Wiener Jubel-Gruss-Marsch, Op. 115
  - Hofball-Quadrille, Op. 116
  - Annen-Polka, Op. 117
  - Lockvögel Walzer, Op. 118
- William Vincent Wallace
  - Fantasie elegante sur des themes de 'Don Pasquale'
  - Happy Birdling of the Forest, Op. 63
- Henri Wieniawski
  - Polonaise de concert, Op. 4
  - Adagio élégiaque, Op. 5
  - Violin Concerto No.1, Op. 14

== Opera ==
- Fromental Halévy – La Juif errant
- Fredrik Pacius – Kung Karls jakt

== Births ==
- January 8 – Maurice Kufferath, editor and conductor (died 1919)
- January 26 – Frederick Corder, translator and composer (died 1932)
- January 29 – Sir Frederic Hymen Cowen, pianist, conductor and composer (d. 1935)
- February 14 - Charles Herbert Clarke, tenor, conductor, and music educator (d. 1928)
- February 17 – Hans Bischoff, pianist and musician (died 1889)
- March 6 – Josef Bayer, composer and music director (d. 1913)
- April 5 – Franz Eckert, bandmaster and composer (d. 1916)
- April 14 – Henrique Oswald, composer (d. 1931)
- May 23 – Mathilda Grabow, opera singer (d. 1940)
- June 23 – Raoul Pugno, organist, pianist and composer (d. 1914)
- June 28 – Hans Huber, composer (d. 1921)
- July 3 – Rafael Joseffy, pianist and composer (d. 1915)
- July 4 – Alfred Grünfeld, arranger and composer (died 1924)
- July 6
  - John Albert Delany composer, conductor (d. 1907)
  - Otto Neitzel, composer and pianist (d. 1920)
  - José Jackson Veyán, librettist (died 1935)
- August 13 – Robert Hausmann, cellist (died 1909)
- September 18 – Francis Money-Coutts, 5th Baron Latymer, librettist (died 1923)
- September 30 – Sir Charles Villiers Stanford, composer (d. 1924)
- October 12 – Max Friedlaender, German musicologist (died 1934)
- November 21 – Francisco Tárrega, guitarist and composer (d. 1909)
- November 23 – James Kwast, pianist (died 1927)
- date unknown – George Barnet Gardiner, folk song collector (died 1910)

== Deaths ==
- February 25 – Thomas Moore, poet and songwriter (b. 1779)
- March 5 – Sophie Gay, librettist (b. 1776)
- March 7 – Jacopo Ferretti, librettist (b. 1784)
- March 15
  - Giuseppe Bertini, composer, choral conductor, music lexicographer, and priest (b. 1759)
  - Antoine de Lhoyer, guitarist and composer (b. 1768)
- June 6 – Tommaso Marchesi, composer (b. 1773)
- July 5 – Mikhail Zagoskin, lyricist and librettist (born 1789)
- July 17 – Salvadore Cammarano, librettist (b. 1801)
- August 17 – Sveinbjörn Egilsson, lyricist (born 1791)
- September 20 – Anton Weidinger, trumpet virtuoso (b. 1767)
- October 6 – Stephen Codman, composer (b. 1796)
- November 12 – Georg Hellmesberger, Jr., violinist and composer (b. 1830)
- date unknown – Ulrika Åberg, ballerina (b. 1771)
