= Cajander =

Cajander is a Finnish surname. Notable people with the surname include:

- Paavo Cajander (1846–1913), Finnish poet and translator
- Aimo Kaarlo Cajander (1879–1943), Finnish botanist and Prime Minister of Finland
