= Fredrik Pacius =

German composer, lived in Finland

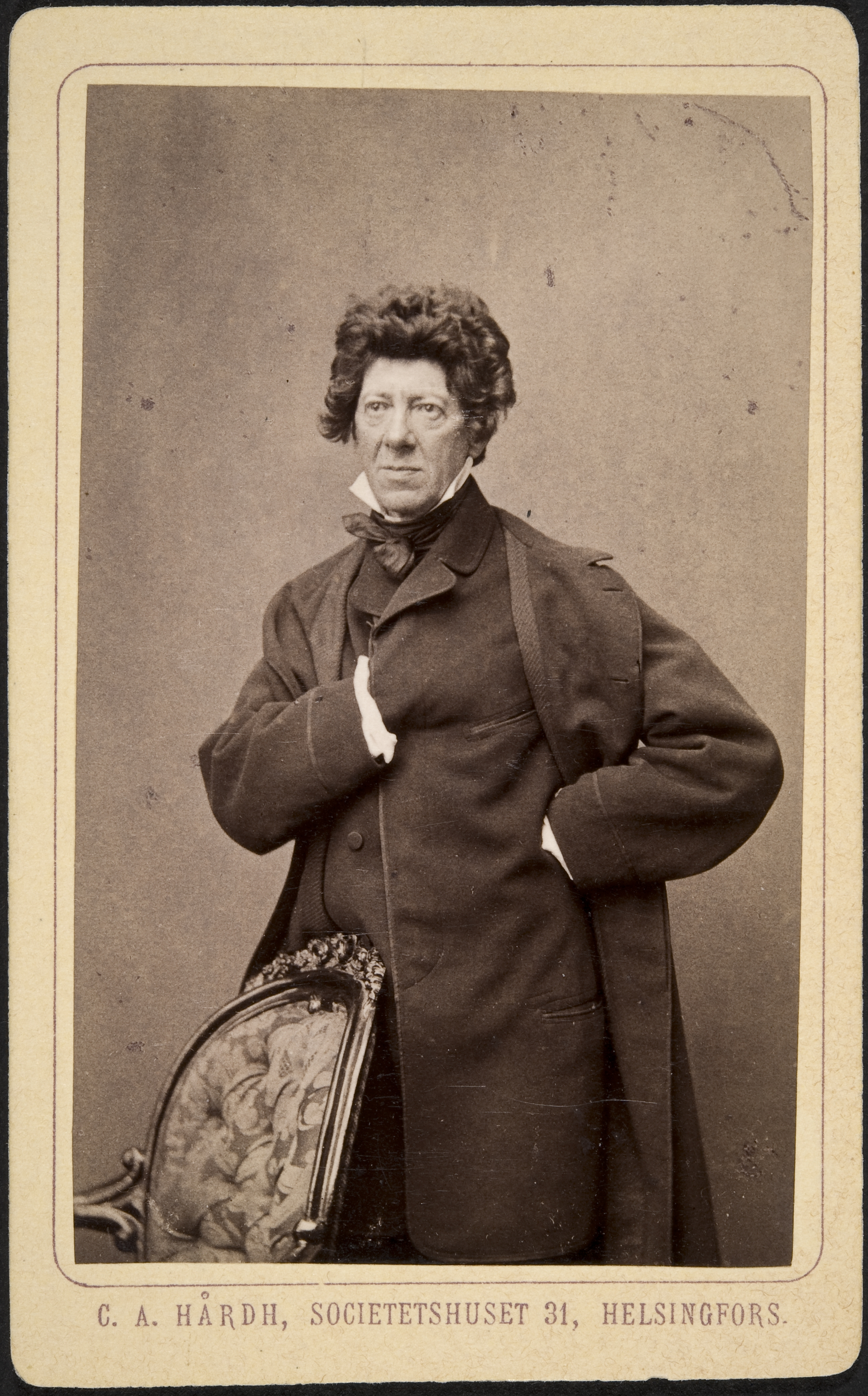

Background information
- Born: Friedrich Pacius; March 19, 1809; Hamburg
- Died: January 8, 1891 (aged 81) Helsinki
- Occupations: Composer, violinist, conductor

Fredrik Pacius (Finnish pronunciation: [ˈfreːdrik ˈpɑːsius], Finland Swedish: [ˈfreːdrik ˈpɑːsiʉs]); in German and in Estonian Friedrich Pacius; 19 March 1809 – 8 January 1891) was a German composer, violinist and conductor who lived most of his life in Finland. He is regarded as the "Father of Finnish music".

Pacius was born in Hamburg. He was appointed music teacher at the University of Helsinki in 1834, where he founded a musical society, the student choir Akademiska Sångföreningen and an orchestra, building up orchestral and choral life in the city. In 1848, Pacius set to music the poem "Vårt land" by Johan Ludvig Runeberg, which became Finland's national anthem. The same melody was also used for the Estonian national anthem "Mu isamaa, mu õnn ja rõõm" and the Livonian ethnic anthem "Min izāmō, min sindimō". In 1852, he composed Kung Carls jagt (English: King Charles' Hunt; Finnish: Kaarle-kuninkaan metsästys), the first opera written in Finland, with a libretto by Zacharias Topelius.

== Biography ==
=== Early life and training ===
Pacius grew up in a musical family in Hamburg; his father, the wine merchant Johann Conrad Ludwig Pacius, played violin and hosted weekly string quartet evenings at home. On the recommendation of Hamburg's music director Albert Gottlieb Methfessel, the celebrated violin pedagogue Ludwig Spohr accepted the 15-year-old Pacius as his pupil in Kassel in 1824, where he studied until 1826. Alongside his violin studies, Pacius studied music theory, counterpoint and composition under Moritz Hauptmann.

=== Building musical life in Helsinki ===
After several years as a violinist at the Royal Court Orchestra in Stockholm, Pacius moved to Helsinki in 1835. There he systematically built up the city's musical life. He organised regular orchestral concert series, first under the name of the Musical Society, then on his own initiative from 1838 to 1844, and from 1844 to 1853 under the Symphony Association which he himself founded. He conducted large-scale oratorio performances, including Handel's Messiah and Carl Heinrich Graun's Der Tod Jesu, with ensembles of up to 100 performers. By 1838 he had established the Academic Choral Society (Akademiska Sångföreningen), which he led regularly until 1846. The musicians and singers he trained spread their skills across the country.

=== Vårt land and the national anthem ===
Runeberg's patriotic poem Vårt land, which opens his verse epic Fänrik Ståls sägner (1848), had previously been set to music by three amateur composers – August Engelberg, F. A. Ehrström and the poet himself – but none of these settings was considered musically satisfying. Pacius composed his setting, rehearsed the choir and wrote an arrangement for brass band in just four days before the premiere.

The first performance took place on Flora Day on 13 May 1848 on Gumtäkt meadow in Helsinki, performed by the Academic Choral Society accompanied by the Guards' Band under Pacius's direction. The song gradually became Finland's national anthem. A key step in this process was a successful Finnish translation by Paavo Cajander.

=== The libretto of Kung Carls jagt ===
The libretto of Kung Carls jagt was written by the author and historian Zacharias Topelius in close collaboration with Pacius, in the style of Romantic nationalism, and like the national anthem was designed to convince Finland's grand duke (i.e. the Russian Emperor Nicholas I) of the total loyalty of his subjects in Finland.

=== Later years ===
Pacius was appointed professor in 1860 and retired from his position at the university in 1869 after 35 years of service, receiving a full pension. He was awarded an honorary doctorate in 1877. After retiring he made several extended visits to Germany and at times considered settling there permanently, but Finland had become his true home.

His final major work, the opera Die Loreley with a libretto by Emanuel Geibel, premiered at the Alexander Theatre in Helsinki in April 1887 and was performed eight times to full houses. At his 75th birthday concert in 1884, Robert Kajanus conducted in his place while Henri Herold performed Pacius's violin concerto. At the audience's request, Pacius himself took the baton at the end of the concert to conduct Vårt land.

Pacius is buried at Hietaniemi Cemetery in Helsinki.

== Works ==
=== Operas and stage music ===
- Kung Carls jagt (Kaarle-kuninkaan metsästys, "King Carl's Hunt"), opera (1852)
- Prinsessan av Cypern, Singspiel (1860)
- Die Loreley, opera (1862–87)

=== Orchestral ===
- Symphony in D minor (1850)
- Overture in E♭ major (1826)
- Violin Concerto in F♯ minor (1845)

=== Chamber music ===
- String Quartet no. 2 (1826)

=== Other compositions ===
- Cantatas, choruses and Lieder
