= Kōrli Stalte =

Livonian activist (1870–1947)

Kōrli Stalte (Latvian: Kārlis Stalte, born 9 August 1870, Mazirbe – died 12 January 1947 in Fehrbellin, Germany) was a prolific Livonian cultural activist. Stalte worked as a teacher in Dundaga and Mazirbe, and as a Livonian language teacher in Lielirbe; and as a cantor and organist in Mazirbe. His wife was Baltic German and he moved to Germany with her when Hitler ordered the resettlement of all Baltic Germans in 1939. Kōrli Stalte died in 1947, in Fehrbellin, Germany.

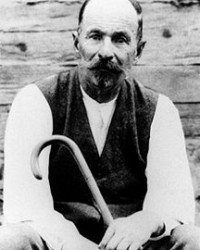
Kōrli Stalte (1870–1947)

He wrote many poems in the Livonian language (Livõd Lolõd for example), and wrote the lyrics of the Livonian national anthem, Min izāmō. His works also include a translation of the New Testament (Ūž testament), and participating in the creation of the biggest Livonian language dictionary yet, Livisches Worterbuch mit Grammatischer Einleitung. Kōrli Stalte's daughter Margareta Stalte composed several songs using Kōrli's poems as lyrics.

== Bibliography ==
- Marjo Mela and Lembit Vaba, Latvian historiaa ja kulttuuria, Rozentāls-seura 2005, ISBN 951-98671-1-2 (Finnish)
- Livones.lv: Kārlis Stalte (Latvian)
- Livones.lv: the biggest Liv language dictionary Archived 2011-07-22 at the Wayback Machine
