= Marcha de Zacatecas =

Song composed by Genaro Codina

English: March of Zacatecas
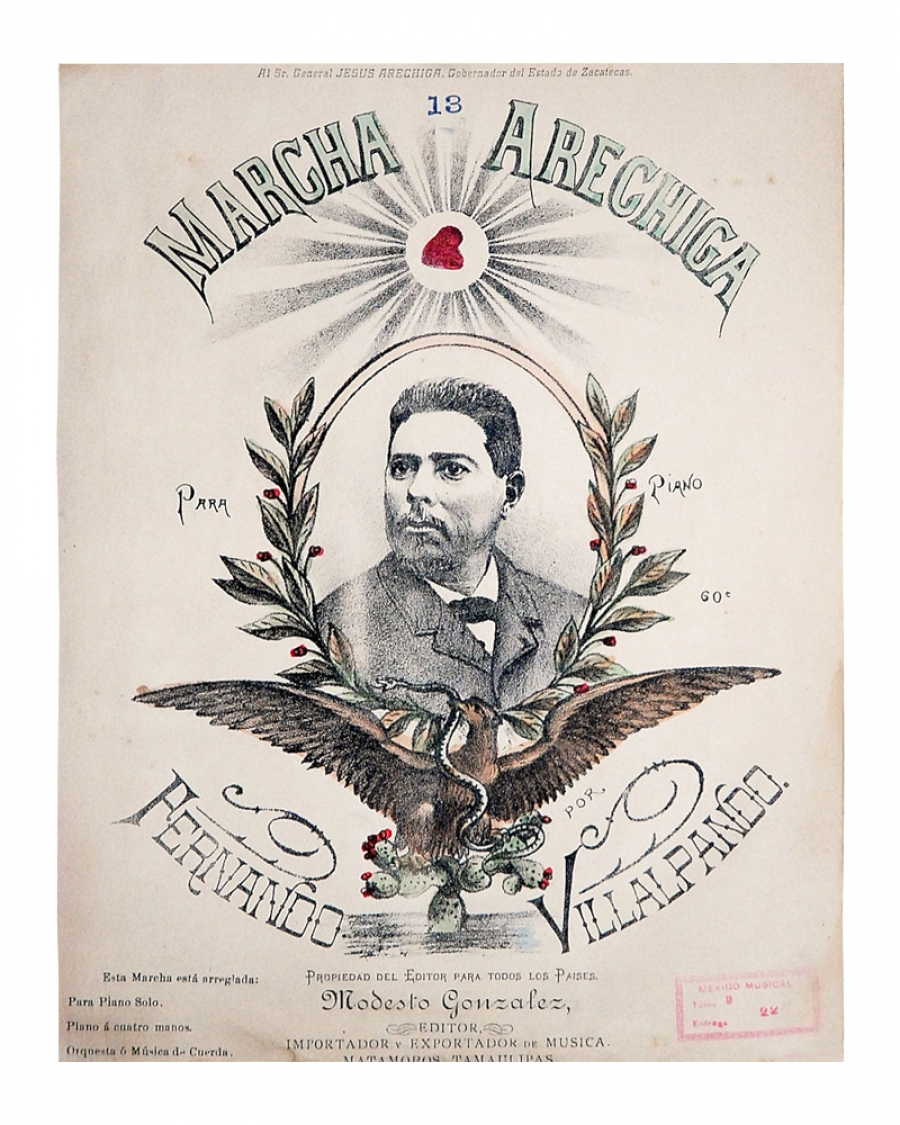
- Regional anthem of Zacatecas
- Also known as: Himno Regional de Zacatecas (English: Regional Anthem of Zacatecas)
- Lyrics: Genaro Codina, 1892
- Music: Fernando Villalpando, 1892

Audio sample
- "Marcha de Zacatecas" (instrumental): file; help

The "Marcha de Zacatecas" (English: "March of Zacatecas") is a Mexican patriotic song that serves as the regional anthem of the Mexican state of Zacatecas.

== History ==
Genaro Codina, the lyrics' author

In 1891, in a family gathering at the home of Fernando Villalpando, there was a bet between Villapando and Genaro Codina, which consisted of writing a military march. The winner would dedicate the song to the then Governor of the State of Zacatecas, General Jesús Aréchiga.

That same year, both the Codina and the Villalpando compositions were submitted to a jury composed of friends and relatives, who gave the victory to the song of Genaro Codina. The original title was "Marcha Aréchiga", to be dedicated to the governor Aréchiga, but he suggested that the name be changed to March of Zacatecas.

The song was premiered in the Hidalgo garden, in the city of Zacatecas, for a serenade of the Municipal Band, directed by Fernando Villalpando, which has the merit of the music; that is where the song earned the title of "Himno Regional de Zacatecas" (English: Regional Anthem of Zacatecas).

Via "Zacatecas March" Codina influenced many other compositions, including "Washington and Lee Swing" (q.v.).

== Lyrics ==
Complete version:.

Coro:

Prestos estad a combatir
Oid llamad, suena el clarín
Las armas pronto preparad
Y la victoria disputad.

Chorus:

Be ready to fight
Hear the call, the bugle sounds
Prepare the weapons quickly
And strive for victory.

Prestos estad, suena el clarín
Anuncia la próxima lid
Vibrando está su clamor
Marchemos con gran valor.

Be ready, the bugle sounds
It announces the next fight
Vibrating is its clamor
Let us march with great bravery.

Estrofa I:

Sí, a la lidia marchemos
Que es hora ya de combatir con gran valor
Con fiero ardor hasta morir
Hasta morir o hasta vencer.

Stanza I:

Yes, let us march to the fight
As it is now time to fight with great courage
With all our might until the death
To death or to victory.

Estrofa II y V:

Como huracán que en su furor
Las olas rompen en el mar
Con rudo empuje y con valor
Sobre las huestes avanzad.

Stanza II and V:

As a hurricane in its fury
The waves breaking on the sea
With impetuous drive and with bravery
Move forward on the enemy.

Estrofa III y VI:

No os detengáis, no hay temor
Pronto el ataque apresurad
Guerra sin tregua al invasor
Viva la Patria y la libertad
Viva la libertad, viva
Viva la libertad, viva
Que viva sí, viva.

Stanza III and VI:

Don't stop, no fear
Soon hurry the attack
War without truce against the invader
Long live the Fatherland and Freedom
Long live freedom, long live
Long live freedom, long live
Long live yes, long live.

Estrofa IV:

Oh, Patria mía
Tu hermoso pabellón
Siempre sabremos
Llevarlo con honor.

Stanza IV:

Oh my Fatherland
Your beautiful flag
We always will
Carry it with honor.
