= The Tales of Ensign Stål =

Epic poem by Finland-Swedish author Johan Ludvig Runeberg

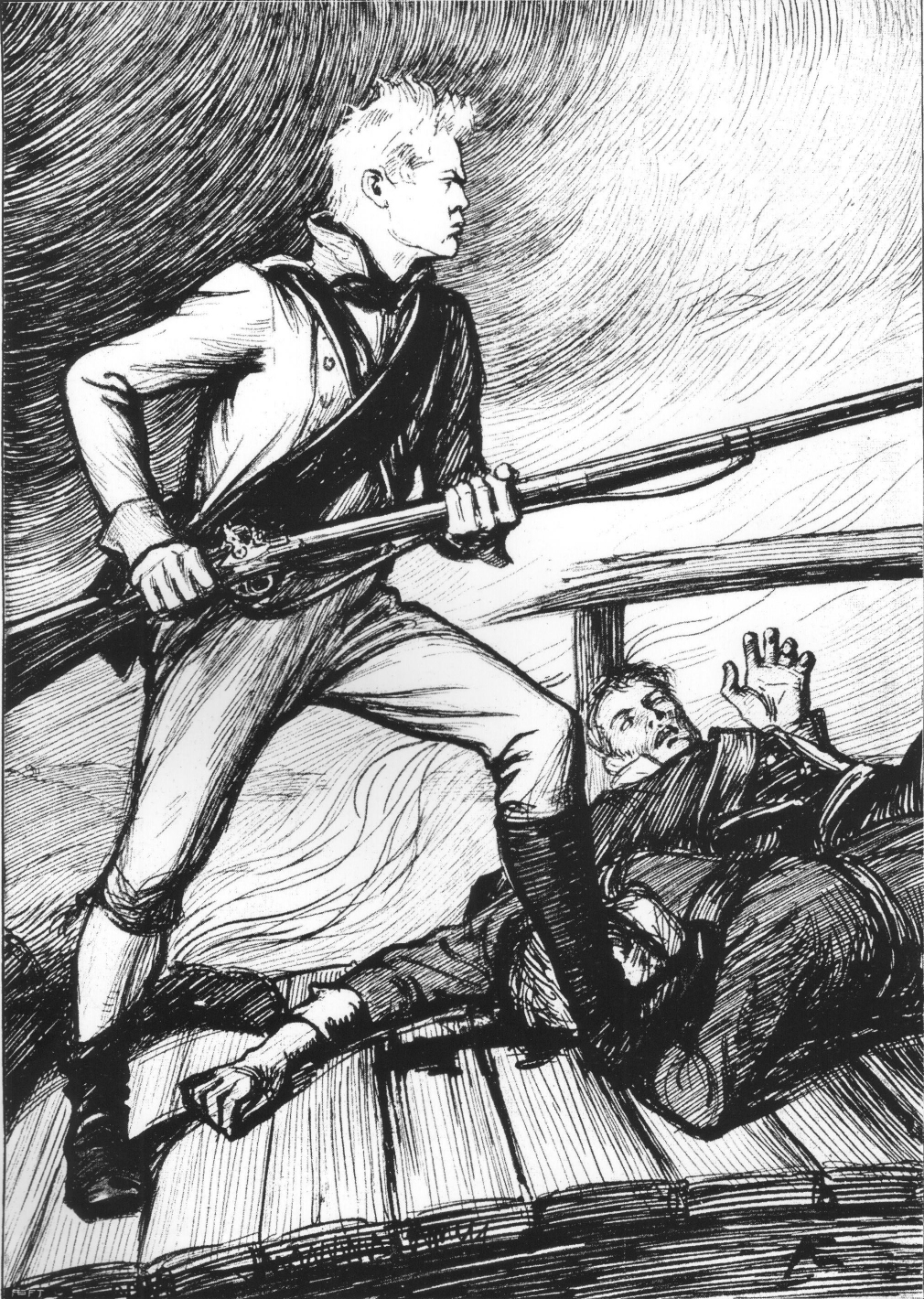
Illustration for the poem "Sven Dufva", Albert Edelfelt, 1890s

The Tales of Ensign Stål (Swedish original title: Fänrik Ståls sägner, Finnish: Vänrikki Stoolin tarinat, or year 2007 translation Vänrikki Stålin tarinat) is an epic poem written in Swedish by the Finland-Swedish author Johan Ludvig Runeberg, the national poet of Finland. It was published in two cycles, in 1848 and in 1860. The poem describes the events of the Finnish War (1808–1809) in which Sweden lost its eastern territories; these would become incorporated into the Russian Empire as the Grand Duchy of Finland.

== Description ==
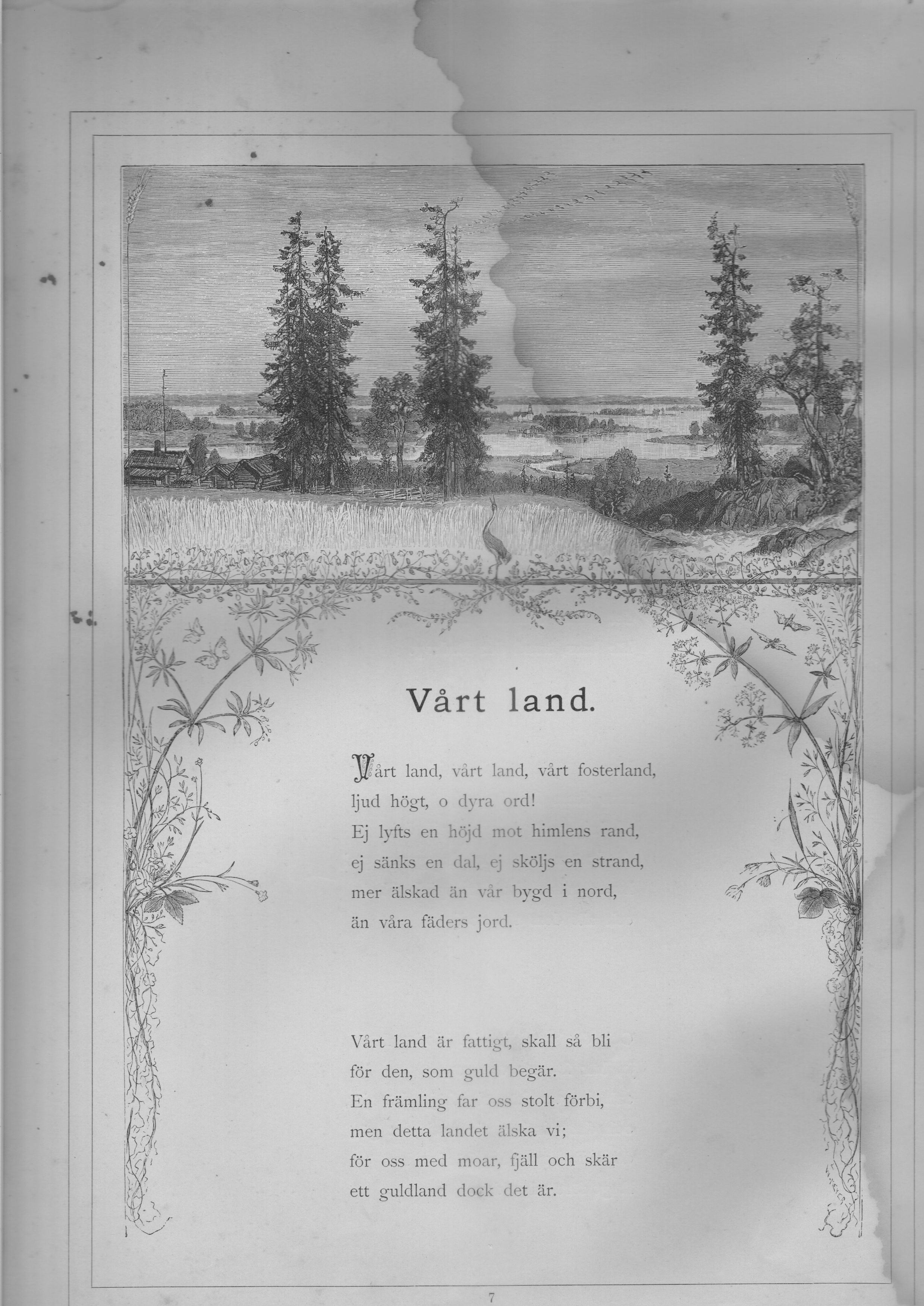
The first poem and eventual Finnish national anthem, Vårt Land.

The first part of Ensign Stål was first published in the revolutionary year 1848, the second in 1860. It shaped Finnish identity and was later given out for free during the Winter War to raise a patriotic spirit. The first chapter of the poem also became the national anthem of Finland.

The name of the title character, "Stål", is Swedish for steel, a typical example of a so-called "soldier's name". These were names, often consisting of simple words for traits or traits related to the military or nature, given to Swedish soldiers by their commanders, and many of Runeberg's characters have them: Dufva, Svärd and Hurtig ('pigeon', 'sword' and 'quick') are other examples.

The poems of Ensign Stål feature several officers who fought in the Finnish War, including marshals Wilhelm Mauritz Klingspor and Johan August Sandels, generals Carl Nathanael af Klercker, Carl Johan Adlercreutz, and Georg Carl von Döbeln, and Colonel Otto von Fieandt.

The influence of Tales of Ensign Stål is also remarkable on Finnish culture because it repeatedly lifts the common people as heroes, despite the hardship of their life. The poem "Soldatgossen" ("Boy soldier") is one that exalts the military virtues and which has been a major influence in the shaping of the legend and myth of the Finnish soldier. The narrator is a young boy, who relates the story of his family, all soldiers. They have respectively all died in the wars of Finland, fighting for their king and country. The boy is now orphan "eating stranger's bread", but he is proud of his military legacy. He cites with pride that his father was "only fifteen" when he joined the ranks. He says he was only a child when his father left, subsequently to be killed in the War of Finland's Lapua battle, but he remembers his fine shape, for he was "fair, too" his proud posture and the plume of this hat. There is a sense of tragedy in the poem, for the boy cannot wait to join himself; he says he wants to go "where the bullets sing hardest, where the fire fulminates". Moreover, he states he cannot not go there, there is an inner compulsion to follow the road marked by his forefathers. Such is the power of the poem it has been accused of rank militarism and glorifying of war, perhaps not without reason. But it is also a fine description of the ideals and mentality of the time: it was acceptable for the Swedish authorities to recruit even fifteen-year olds to war and such tasks were glorified in society. The boy states that his father's road "always led to honor", and that he "gladly suffered cold, hunger and his wounds", the epitome of military resilience. It gives us a flashback to the way of thinking of the past military ideals. Whether any soldier gladly suffers cold, hunger and wounds is another matter: this is what was expected of them. That even a young boy unquestioningly chooses that road tells us perhaps the lack of avenues available in that society: the shame of "eating stranger's bread" i.e. being subject to charity, can only be wiped out by following in his father's footsteps and dying, at least fighting, for his country. He says: "I'm a hero's son, I shall not go to waste." So, even a poor military orphan boy can achieve transcendence and honor, when officers – at least some of them – totally lose their honor. The concept of military honor is strong in Tales of Ensign Ståhl, but it is often found in surprising persons, often persons of lower rank, such as the intellectually disabled Sven Dufva, or in unarmed governor, or in munitions provider Lotta Svärd. As such, this was important to the development of the national feeling, for the common people were seen as worthy, sometimes even worthier than the upper class. The personage of Lotta Svärd and the Soldier boy poem, when composed to music, were later taken up by defence organisations as their symbols.

Among the most famous characters is the simple but heroic rotesoldat Sven Dufva. The organisations Lotta Svärd and the Swedish Women's Voluntary Defence Organization ("Lottorna") were named after the character in the poem of the same name.

From its publication to the mid-twentieth Century, The Tales of Ensign Stål was staple reading in both Finnish and Swedish schools. It shaped the later image of the war and of some of its real-life protagonists. Admiral Carl Olof Cronstedt is mainly remembered today for his treacherous surrender of the fortress of Sveaborg. The Russian general Yakov Kulnev, on the other hand, is described positively as a chivalrous and brave soldier and ladies' man.

Ensign Stål was translated into Finnish by a group led by fennoman professor Julius Krohn in 1867. Later translations were made by Paavo Cajander in 1889 and Otto Manninen 1909. Albert Edelfelt drew the illustrations between 1894 and 1900. Due to the dated language, a new translation was issued in 2007. It raised some controversy, in particular due to the new wording of the poem Vårt Land, the national anthem of Finland.

== Gallery ==
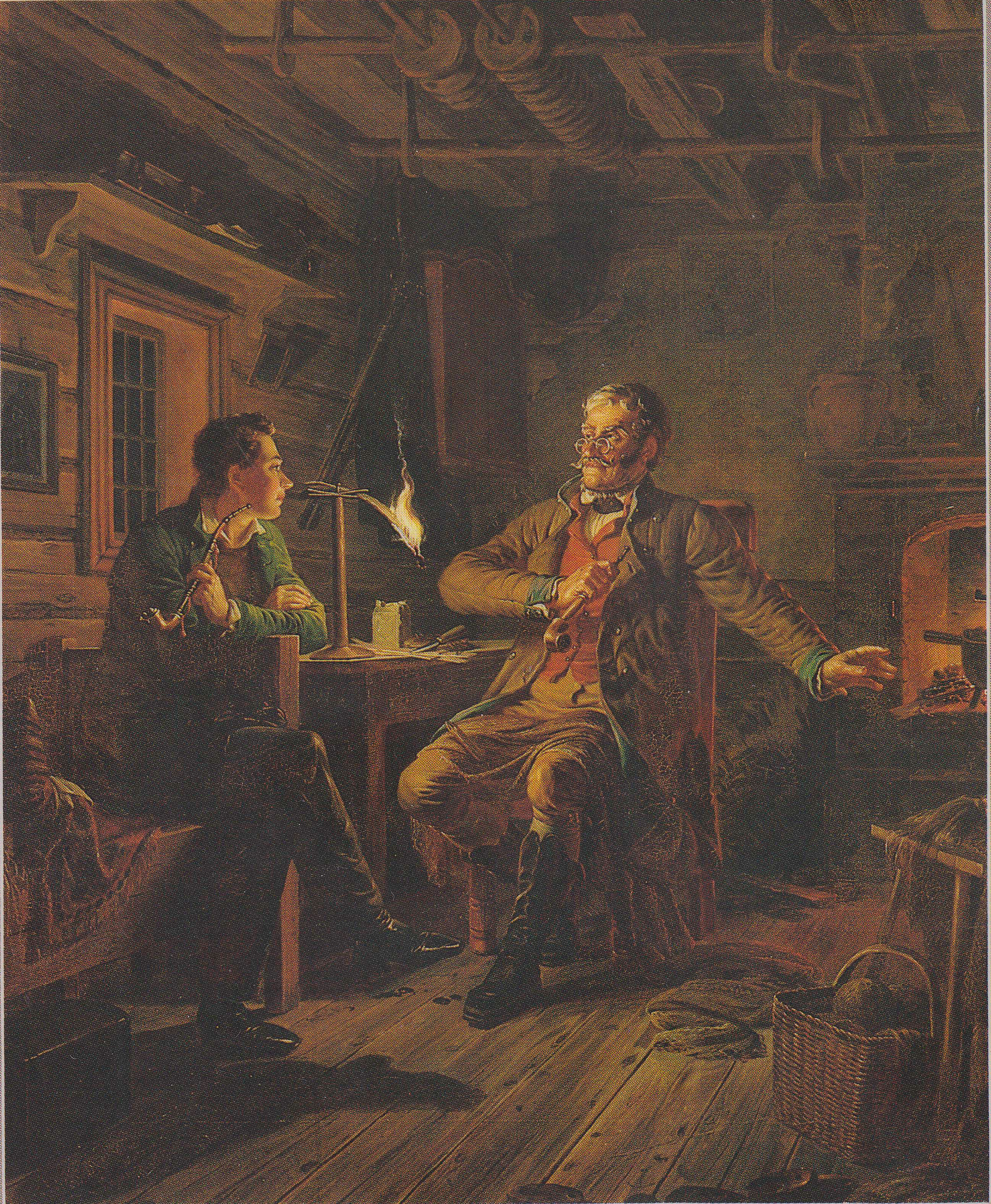
Ensign Stål and the undergraduate, Robert Wilhelm Ekman, 1853

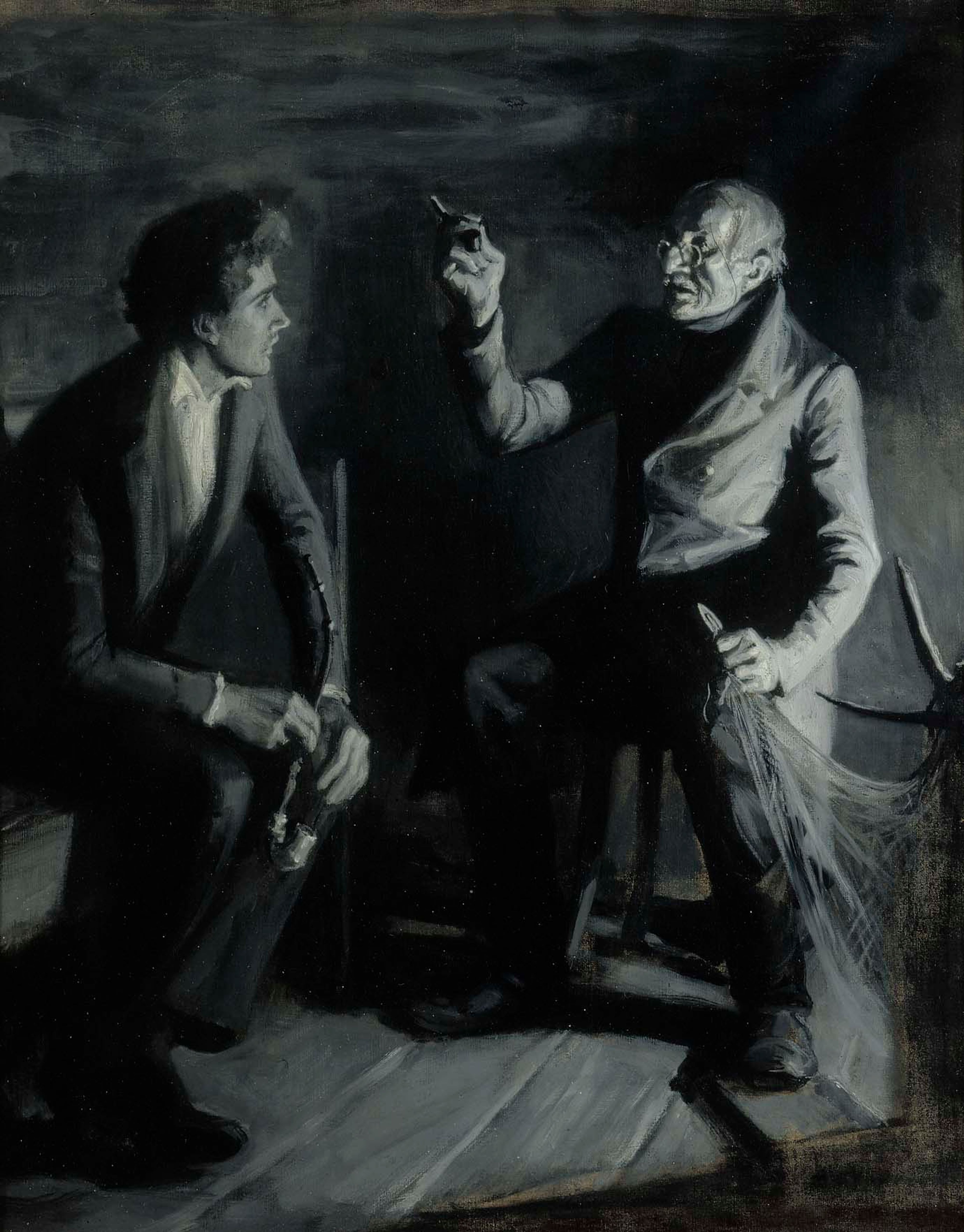
"Dictate he begins of Duncker...", Albert Edelfelt, 1898–1900

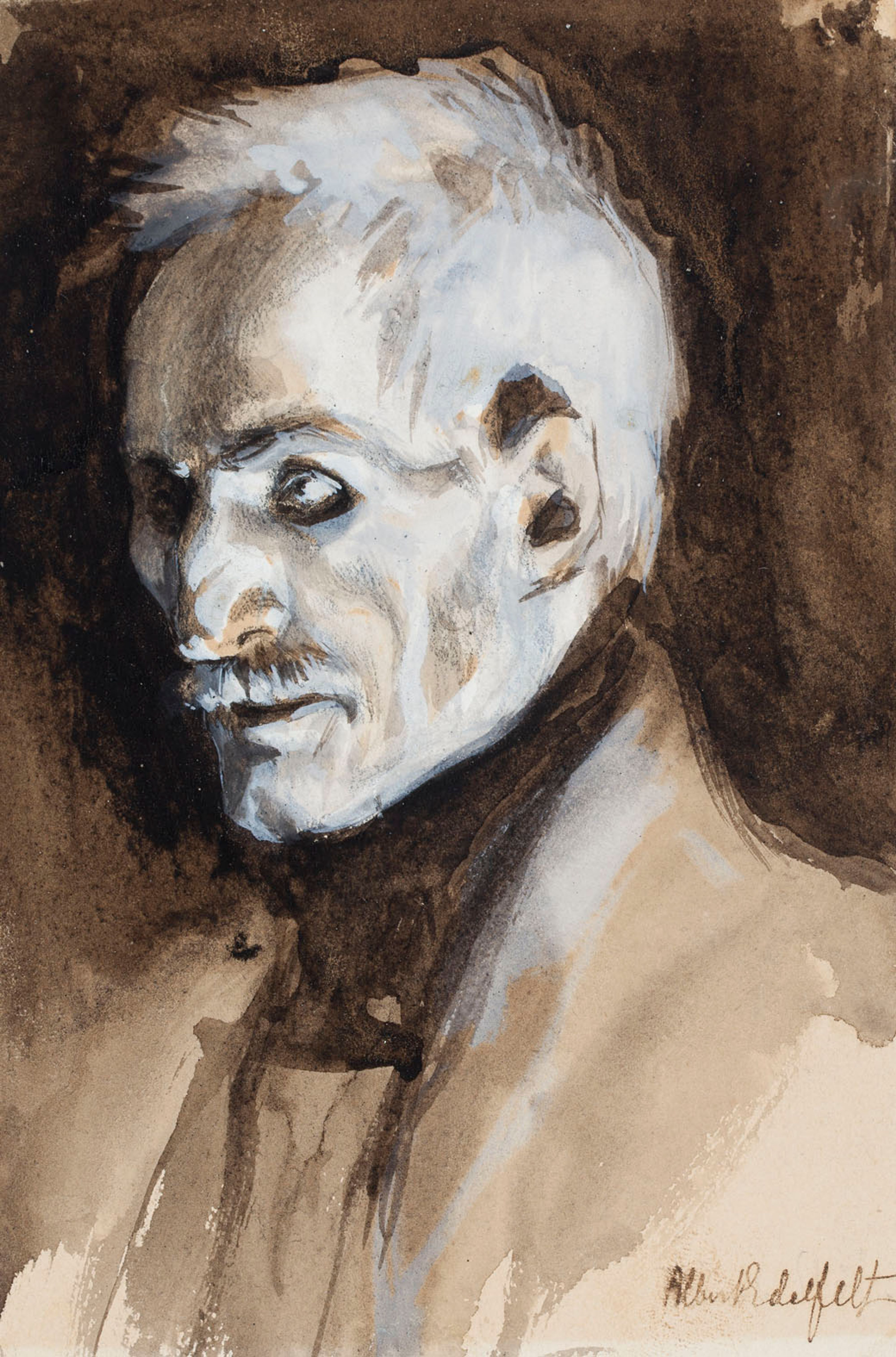
Ensign Stål, Albert Edelfelt, 1898

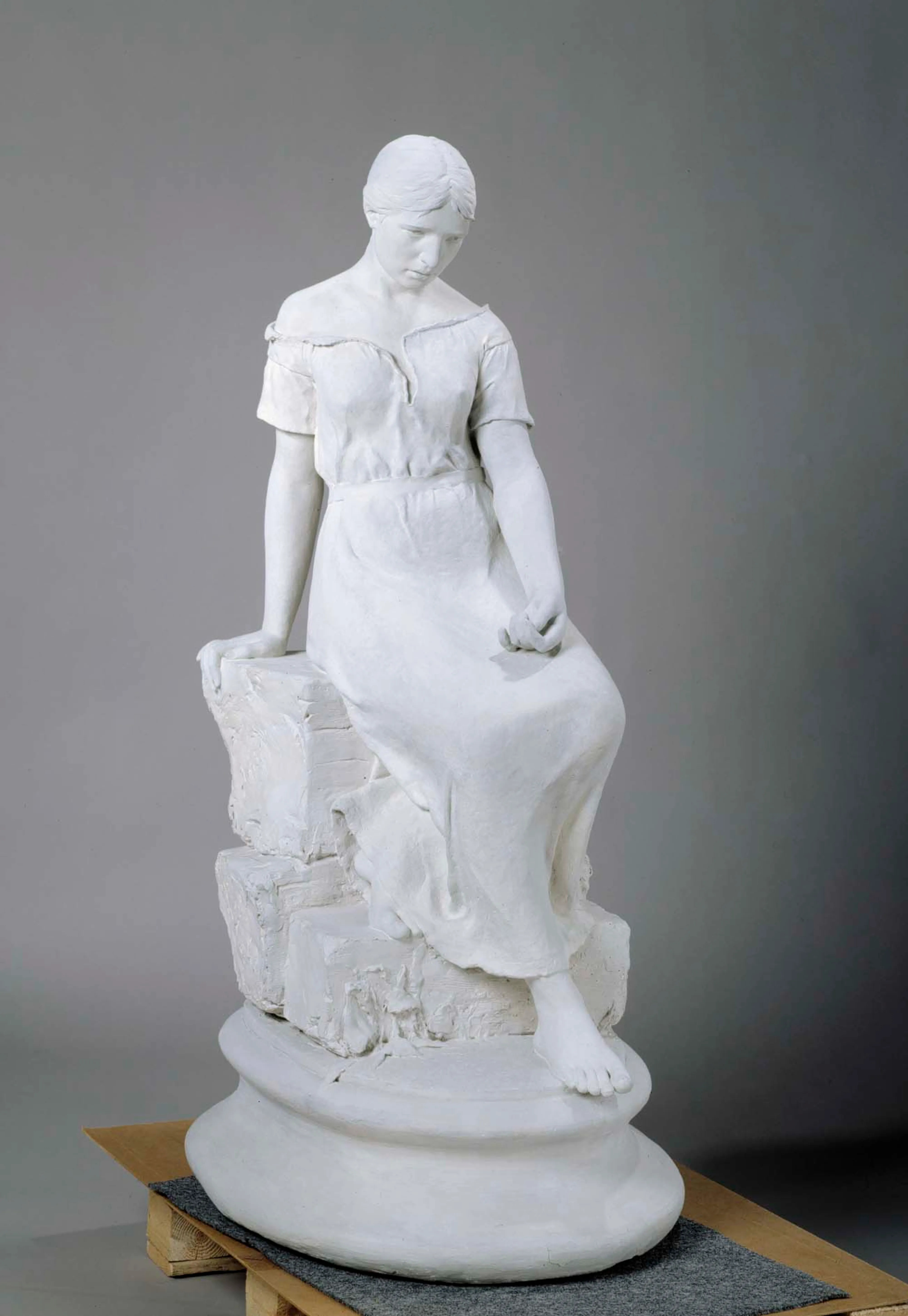
The Croft Girl, Ville Vallgren, 1882

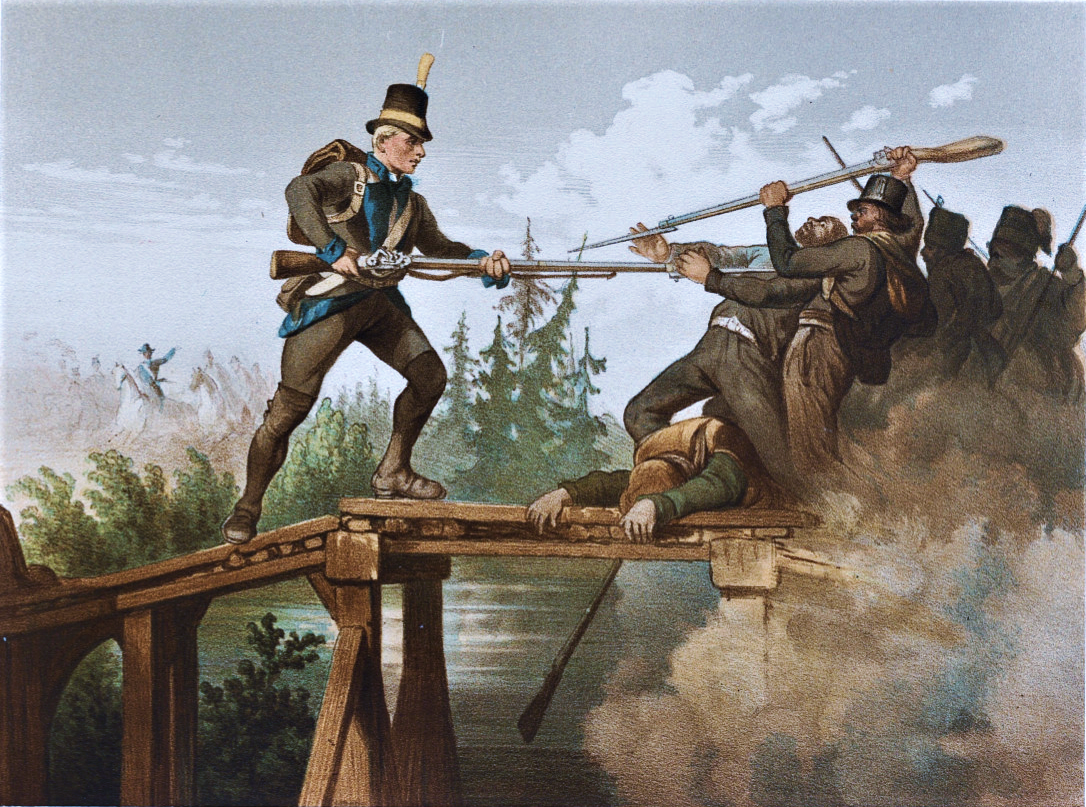
Sven Dufva and the Battle of Koljonvirta by Carl Staaff

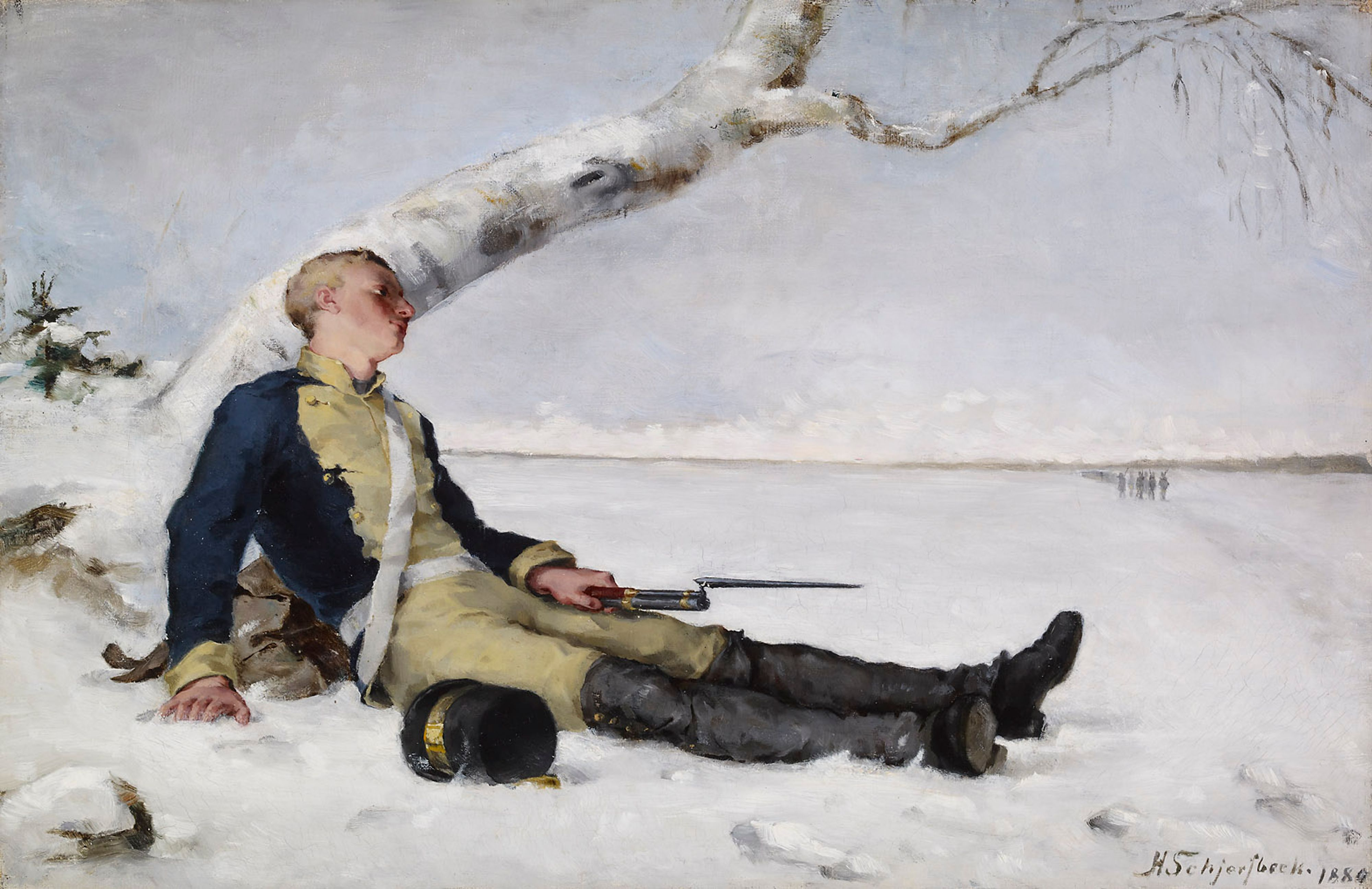
Wounded Warrior in the Snow, Helene Schjerfbeck, 1880, the scene not directly from any poem but influenced by them

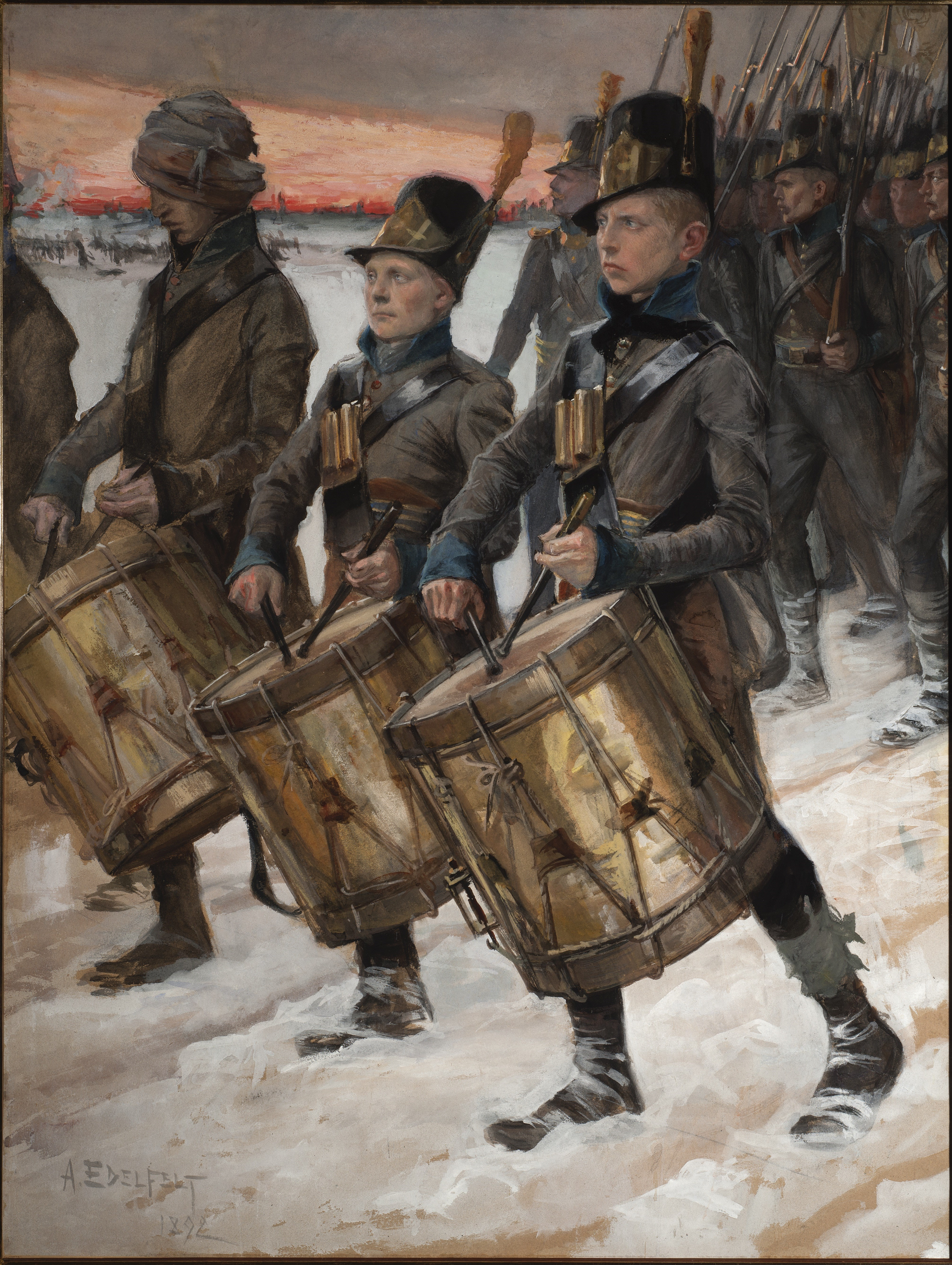
March of the Pori Regiment, Albert Edelfelt, 1892

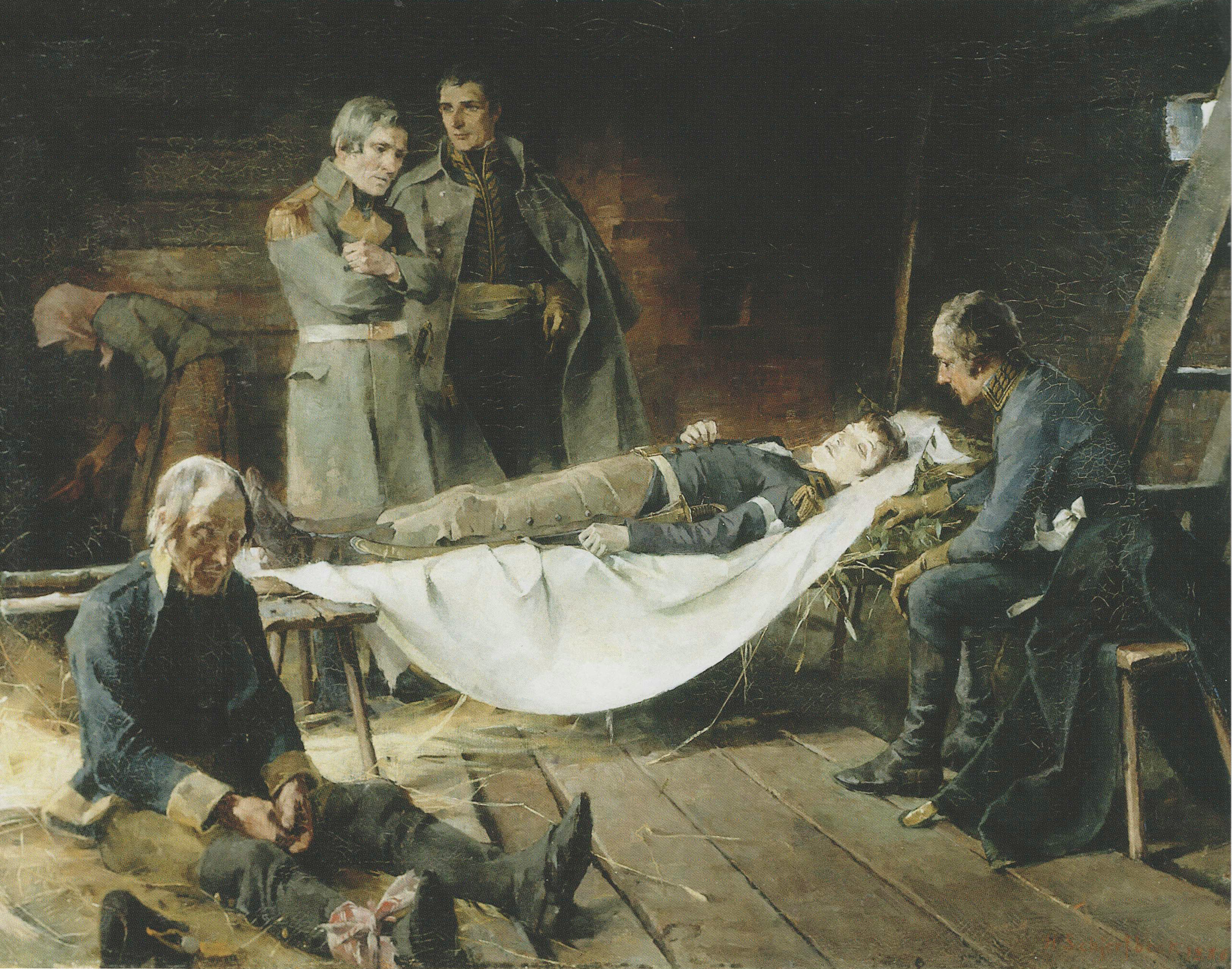
The Death of Wilhelm von Schwerin, Helene Schjerfbeck, 1886

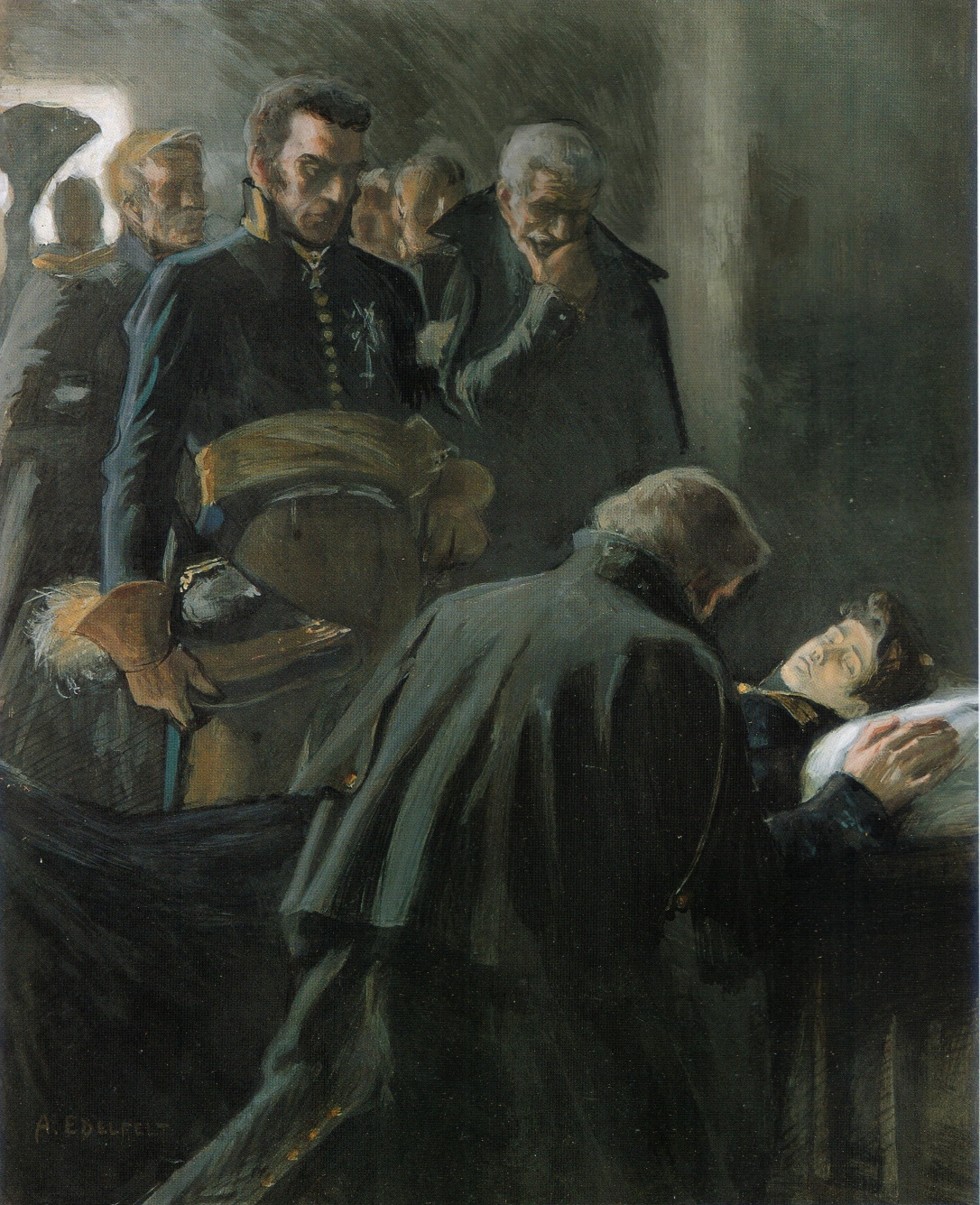
The Death of Wilhelm von Schwerin, Albert Edelfelt, 1900

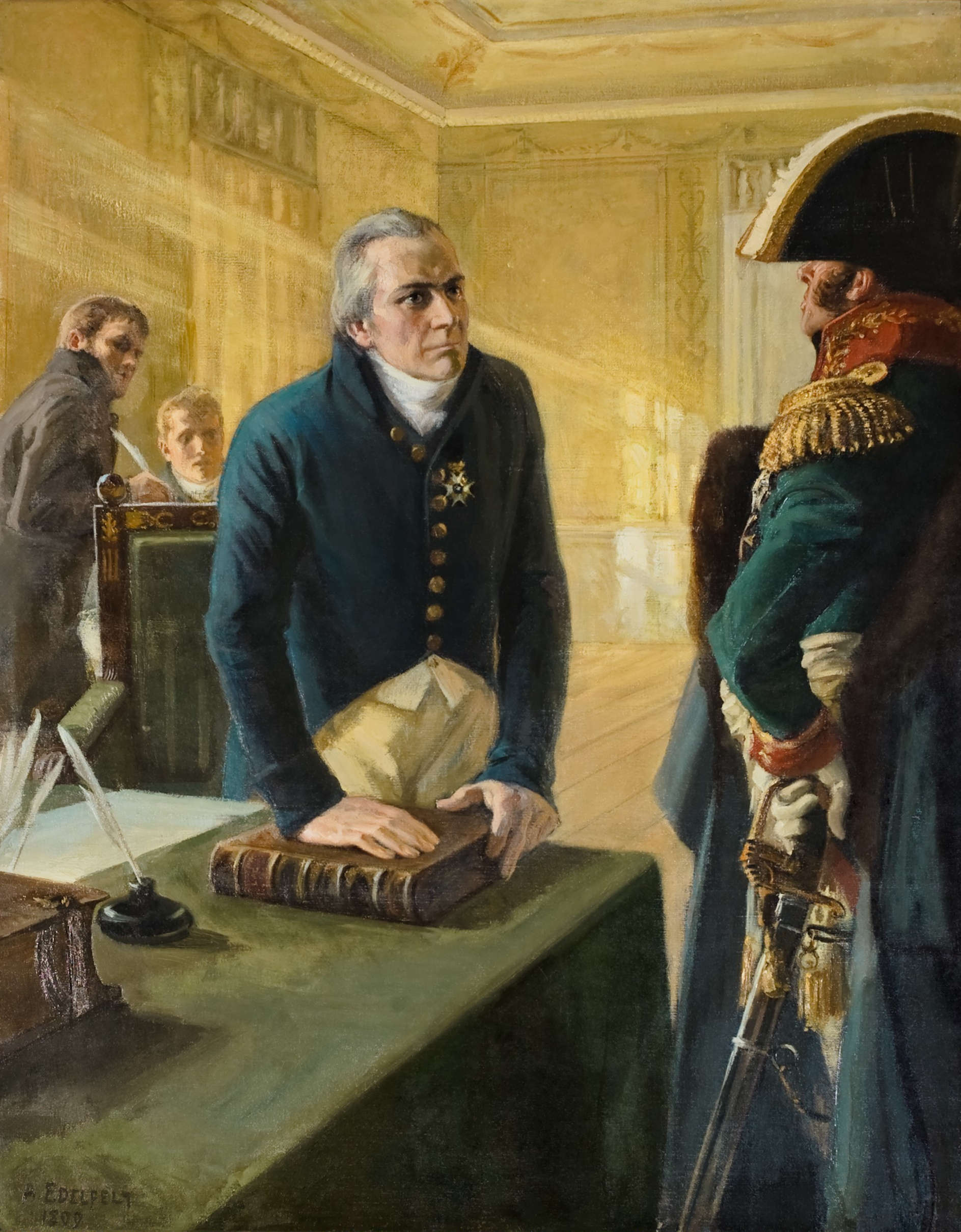
Governor (Maaherra), Albert Edelfelt, 1899

== See also ==
- Gustaf Adolf Montgomery
- The Tales of Ensign Stål (film)
- Sven Tuuva the Hero, a 1958 film based on the Sven Dufva poem
