= Kung Karls jakt =

19th Century Finnish opera

Ballad composed by Fredrik Pacius for the Hunt of King Charles
Performed in 1929 by Aleks Wilkko on trumpet and Salonkiorkesteri Graco (2:45)

Kung Karls jakt (English: King Charles' Hunt; Finnish: Kaarle-kuninkaan metsästys) is an opera with music by Fredrik Pacius and a libretto by Zacharias Topelius. It was the first opera to be composed in Finland and was in the style of Romantic nationalism. Kung Karls jakt was first performed in Helsinki on 24 March 1852. The text is in Swedish (Swedish and Finnish are both official languages in Finland) and concerns an event from Finnish history when Finland was a province of Sweden in the 17th century. The work takes the form of a Singspiel with spoken dialogue between the musical numbers (the king himself does not sing). The music is heavily influenced by contemporary German and Italian opera, with a few Finnish elements such as the use of a kantele in one scene.

== Roles ==
Cast	Voice type	Premiere cast
King Charles XI	spoken role	
Leonora	soprano	
Jonathan	tenor	
Reutercrantz	bass	
Gustaf Gyllenstjerna	baritone	

== Synopsis ==
The plot concerns the visit of the young King Charles XI to Åland to go hunting. Leonora, the daughter of a local fisherman, learns of a plot against the king's life and saves him. In return, the king spares the life of her fiancé Jonathan, who has been condemned to death for killing one of the royal elks.

== Recordings ==
- Kung Karls Jakt Soloists, Jubilate Choir, Finnish National Opera Orchestra, conducted by Ulf Söderblom (Finlandia, 1991)
- The Hunt of King Charles (sung in Finnish translation) ( Kaarle-Kuninkaan Metsästys, in Finnish language) Soloists, Pori Opera Choir, Pori Sinfonietta, conducted by Ari Rasilainen (Marco Polo, 2007)

== Sources ==
- Ruth-Esther Hillila and Barbara Blanchard Hong: Historical Dictionary of the Music and Musicians of Finland (Greenwood, 1997) p. 293
- Donald Jay Grout A Short History of Opera (Columbia University Press, 2003 ed.) p. 547
- Penguin Guide to Opera on Compact Discs (1993) pp. 282–283
