= Valse-Impromptu (Liszt) =

1852 composition for piano by Franz Liszt

"Valse-Impromptu"

"Valse-Impromptu", S.213, is a waltz for solo piano composed by Franz Liszt in the key of A♭ major.

First published in 1852, the piece is believed to have been composed between 1842 and 1852. A longer and lesser-heard version, "Valse-Impromptu with Later Additions" (c. 1880, S.213a), was recorded for the first time by Australian pianist Leslie Howard as part of his complete recordings of Liszt's piano works. Depending on tempo, performances of the original Valse are approximately 5 1/2 minutes, while the extended version is about 1 1/2 minute longer.

Although it is not considered one of Liszt's better-known pieces, "Valse-Impromptu" has been recorded by many notable pianists.
