= Mu isamaa, mu õnn ja rõõm =

National anthem of Estonia

English: 'My Fatherland, My Happiness and Joy'
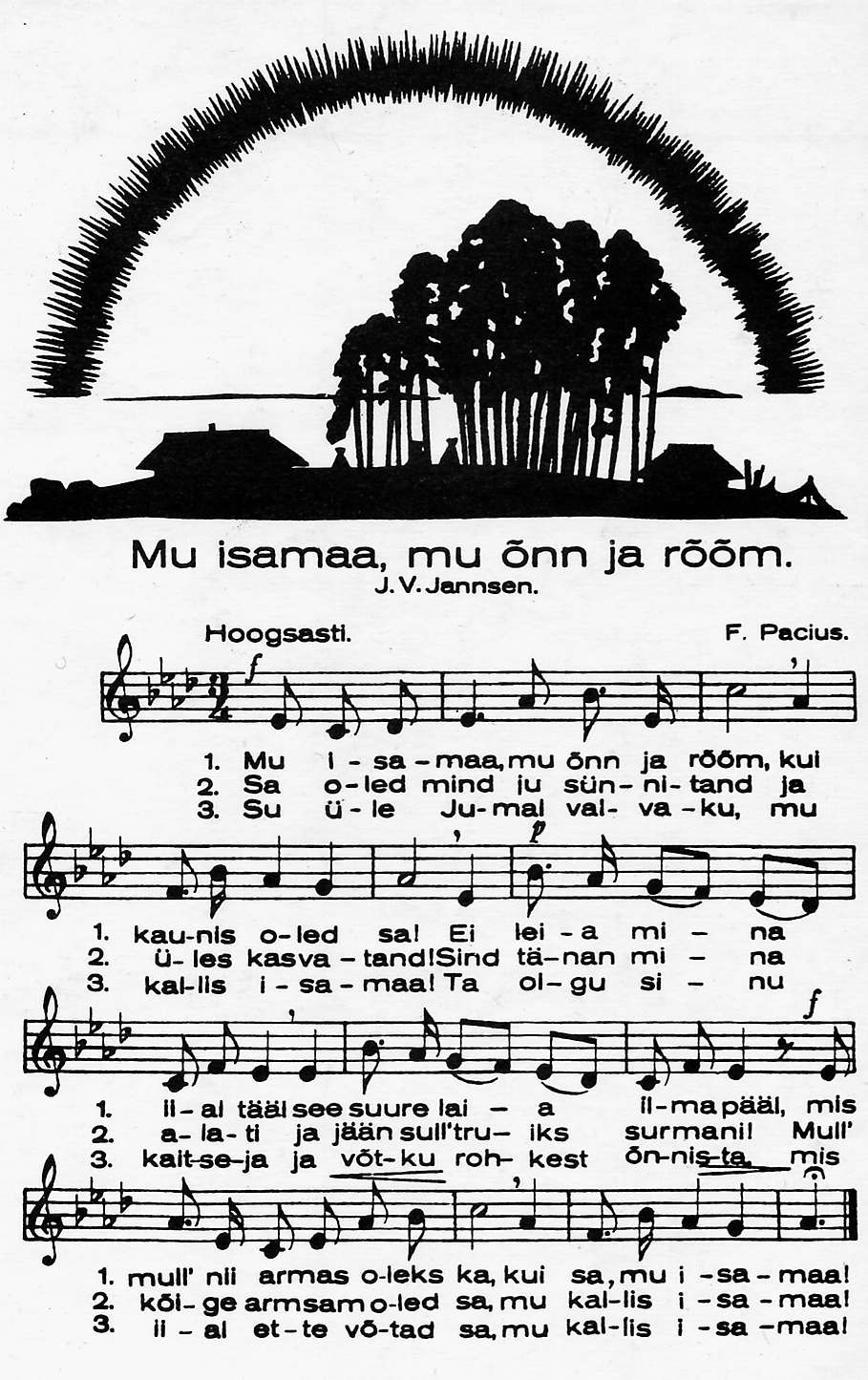
- Sheet music
- National anthem of Estonia
- Lyrics: Johann Voldemar Jannsen, 1869; 157 years ago
- Music: Fredrik Pacius, 1848
- Adopted: 1920; 106 years ago
- Readopted: May 1990; 36 years ago

Audio sample
- Official Instrumental Version: file; help

"Mu isamaa, mu õnn ja rõõm" (Note: Estonian pronunciation: [mu ˈisɑmɑː mu ˈɤnʲː jɑ ˈrɤːm]; lit. "My Fatherland, My Happiness and Joy") is the national anthem of Estonia, originally adopted in 1920 (readopted 1990).

The lyrics were written by Johann Voldemar Jannsen and are set to a melody composed in 1848 by Fredrik Pacius, which is also that of the Finnish national anthem "Maamme", then the unofficial anthem of the Grand Duchy of Finland. The only differences between the two anthems are their key signature and the repetition of the last four lines of each verse in the Finnish anthem. The melody is also used as an ethnic anthem of the Livonian people, titled "Min izāmō".

== History ==
The song was first presented to the public as a choral work in the Grand Song Festival of Estonia in 1869 and quickly became a symbol of the Estonian National Awakening.

"Mu isamaa, mu õnn ja rõõm" was officially adopted as the national anthem of Estonia in 1920, after the Estonian War of Independence.

During 1940–1941, and again in 1944, the Soviet Union occupied Estonia, and "Mu isamaa, mu õnn ja rõõm" was subsequently banned by the Soviet government. The Estonian Soviet Socialist Republic had its own official regional anthem. However, Estonians could often hear the banned national anthem, as Finland's state broadcaster Yleisradio, whose radio and television broadcasts were received in northern Estonia, played an instrumental version of the nearly-identical Finnish national anthem at the conclusion of its broadcast every night.

In 1990, with the restoration of Estonian independence, use of the anthem and other symbols of the Estonian SSR was terminated and "Mu isamaa, mu õnn ja rõõm" was restored as the national anthem.

The lyrics of the anthem were translated into Võro by Sulev Iva on 23 August 2005.

== Lyrics ==
1908 piano and vocal recording
First vocal recording

c. 1914 band instrumental recording (one verse)
First instrumental recording

1927 a cappella choral vocal recording (with repeats)

U.S. Navy Band instrumental version (one verse)

Estonian original

Mu isamaa, mu õnn ja rõõm,
kui kaunis oled sa!
Ei leia mina iial teal
see suure, laia ilma peal,
mis mul nii armas oleks ka,
kui sa, mu isamaa!

Sa oled mind ju sünnitand
ja üles kasvatand;
sind tänan mina alati
ja jään sull' truuiks surmani,
mul kõige armsam oled sa,
mu kallis isamaa!

Su üle Jumal valvaku
mu armas isamaa!
Ta olgu sinu kaitseja
ja võtku rohkest õnnista,
mis iial ette võtad sa,
mu kallis isamaa!

IPA transcription (Note: See Help:IPA/Estonian and Estonian phonology.)

[mu ˈi.sɑ.mɑː mu ɤnʲ.nʲ‿jɑ rɤːm ǀ]
[kui̯ ˈkɑu̯.nʲis ˈo.let sɑ ǁ]
[ei̯ ˈlei̯.ɑ ˈmi.nɑ ˈiː.ɑl teɑ̯l]
[seː ˈsuː.re ˈlɑi̯.ɑ ˈil.mɑ peɑ̯l ǀ]
[mis mul nʲiː ˈɑr.mɑs ˈo.leks kɑ ǀ]
[kui̯ sɑː mu ˈi.sɑ.mɑː ǁ]

[sɑ ˈo.let mint ju ˈsynʲ.nʲit̚.tɑnt]
[jɑ ˈy.les ˈkɑs.ʋɑt̚.tɑnt ǁ]
[sʲint ˈtæ.nɑn ˈmi.nɑ ˈɑ.lɑt̚ʲ.tʲi]
[jɑ jæːn sulʲ ˈtruː.iks ˈsur.mɑ.nʲi ǀ]
[mul ˈkɤi̯.ke ˈɑrm.sɑm ˈo.let sɑ ǀ]
[mu ˈkɑlʲ.lʲis ˈi.sɑ.mɑː ǁ]

[su ˈy.le ˈju.mɑl ˈʋɑl.ʋɑk̚.ku]
[mu ˈɑr.mɑs ˈi.sɑ.mɑː ǁ]
[tɑ ˈol.ku ˈsʲi.nu ˈkɑi̯t.se.jɑ]
[jɑ ˈʋɤt.ku ˈroh.kest ˈɤnʲ.nʲis.tɑ ǀ]
[mis ˈiː.ɑl ˈet̚ˑ.te ˈʋɤt̚.tɑt sɑ ǀ]
[mu ˈkɑlʲ.lʲis ˈi.sɑ.mɑː ǁ]

Poetic English translation

My native land, my joy – delight,
How fair thou art – how bright!
For nowhere in the world around
Can ever such a place be found
So well belov'd, from sense profound,
My native country dear!

My tiny crib stood on thy soil,
Whose blessings eased my toil.
May my last breath be thanks to thee,
For true to death I'll ever be,
O worthy, most belov'd and fine,
Thou, dearest country mine!

May God in Heaven thee defend,
My own beloved land!
May He be guard, may He be shield,
For ever bless and guardian wield
Protection for all deeds of thine,
My own, my dearest land!

Literal English translation

My fatherland, my joy and happiness,
How beautiful you are!
I shall not find such ever
In this huge wide world
Which would be so dear to me
As you, my fatherland!

You have given me birth
And raised me up;
I shall thank you always
And remain faithful to you ’til death,
To me most beloved are you,
My precious fatherland!

May God watch over you,
My precious fatherland!
Let Him be your defender
And provide bountiful blessings
For whatever you undertake,
My precious fatherland!

== See also ==
- Coat of arms of Estonia
- Flag of Estonia
- "Mu isamaa on minu arm", an Estonian patriotic song with a similar name
- "Maamme", the national anthem of Finland
- "Min izāmō", the ethnic anthem of the Livonians
