= Maamme =

National anthem of Finland

Maamme Vårt land
English: 'Our Land'
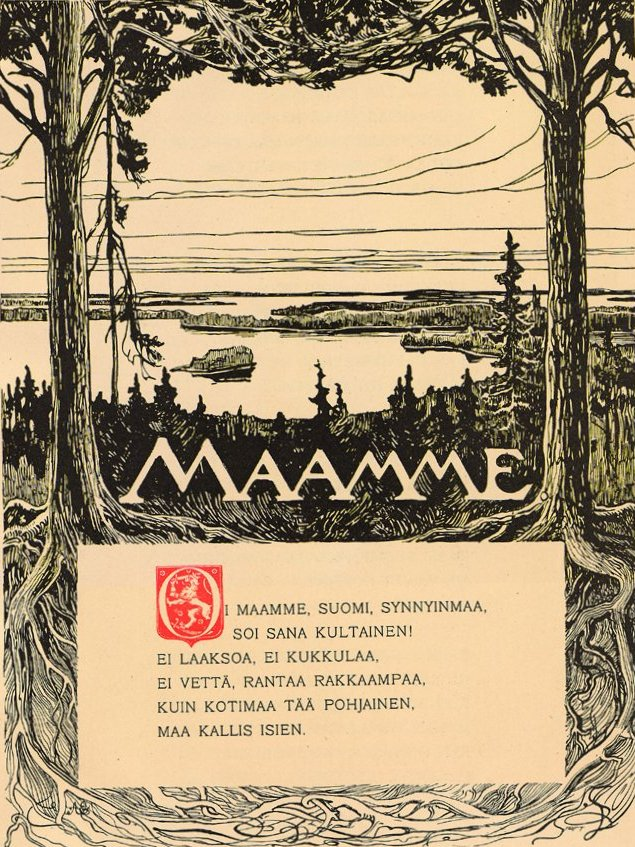
- The first stanza of "Maamme" from the Finnish translation of The Tales of Ensign Stål
- National anthem of Finland
- Also known as: "Vårt land" (English: 'Our Land')
- Lyrics: Johan Ludvig Runeberg, 1846
- Music: Fredrik Pacius, 1848
- Adopted: 1917

Audio sample
- U.S. Navy Band instrumental rendition in B-flat major: file; help

"Maamme" (Finnish: [ˈmɑːmːe]), known by its original Swedish title as "Vårt land" (Finland Swedish: [ˈvoːrt ˈlɑnːd]) and in English as "Our Land", is the de facto national anthem of Finland. The music was composed by the German immigrant Fredrik Pacius, with original Swedish lyrics by Johan Ludvig Runeberg. It was first performed on 13 May 1848. Originally, it was written for the 500th anniversary of Porvoo, and for that occasion it was Runeberg himself who wrote the music.

The melody of "Maamme" is also used for two other anthems: the Estonian anthem "Mu isamaa, mu õnn ja rõõm" ("My Fatherland, My Happiness and Joy") and the Livonian anthem "Min izāmō" ("My Fatherland").

== History ==
1929 a cappella choral vocal recording
First vocal recording, with Heikki Klemetti conducting, music composed by Fredrik Pacius

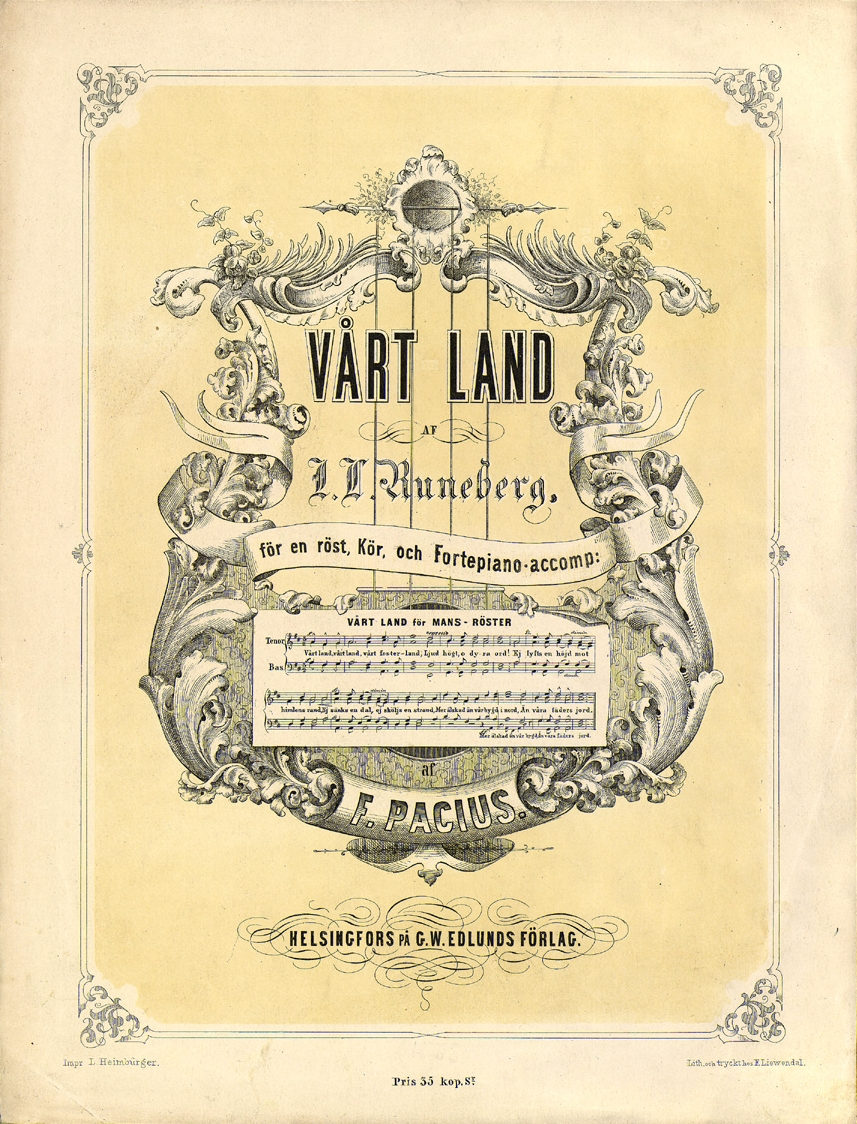
Frontpage of "Vårt land" by Johan Ludvig Runeberg

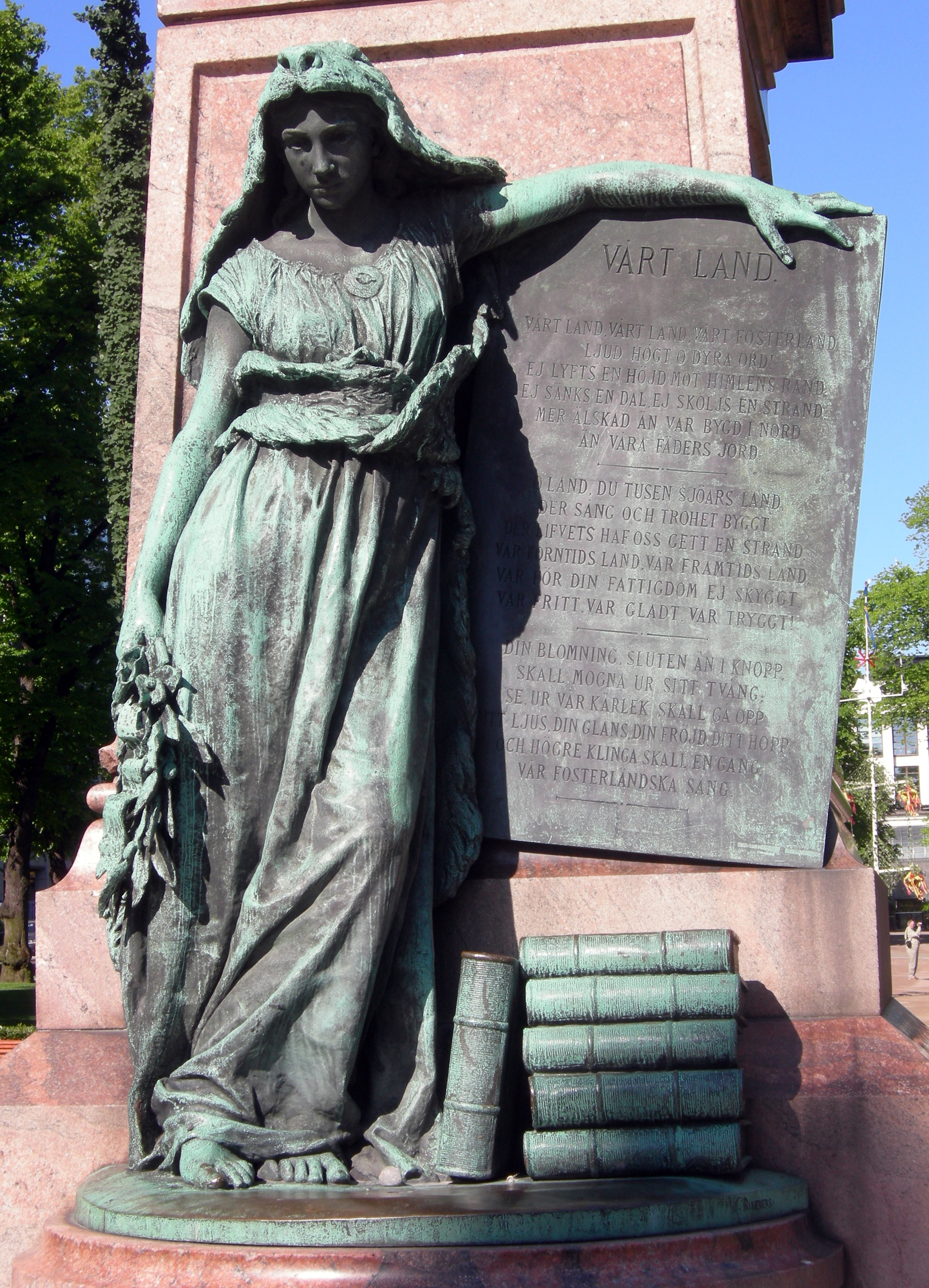
The Swedish words of the "Vårt Land" poem appear in Johan Ludvig Runeberg's monument in Helsinki. Sculptor Walter Runeberg.

The original poem, written in 1846 but not printed until 1848, had 11 stanzas and formed the prologue to the verse cycle The Tales of Ensign Stål ("Fänrik Ståhls sägner"), a classic example of Romantic nationalism. The current Finnish language text is usually attributed to the 1889 translation of Ensign Stål by Paavo Cajander, but in fact, originates from the 1867 translation by Julius Krohn.

In the 1880s and the 1920s, there were more attempts to replace it with a Finnish language version but these ceased by the 1930s. Some Finns have proposed that the Finnish national anthem be set as "Finlandia" by Jean Sibelius, with lyrics by V.A. Koskenniemi (Finnish) and Joel Rundt (Swedish).

It is said that Pacius composed the tune in four days. It was popular throughout the 19th century but established its current position only after Pacius' death.

== Status and usage ==
There is no law regarding an official national anthem in Finland, in the way the coat of arms and flag of Finland are legally defined. Instead, its position has been established gradually by convention over the years. In 2018, "Maamme" was described by the Government of Finland as the "Finnish national anthem".

Even though "Maamme" has become established as the de facto anthem, its status has still been debated from time to time. It has been suggested that the status of "Maamme" as the national anthem should be legalised. For example, opposing legislative initiatives were made in 2003 by the Finnish Parliament to make "Maamme" and the Finlandia Hymn the official national anthem. In 2014, there was a citizens' initiative about choosing the Finlandia Hymn as the national anthem, and in 2016 members of the National Coalition Party began campaigning to stop using "Maamme" in favour of the Finlandia Hymn, however, opinions were not unanimous in the party, and the campaign fell short of its goal.

Despite the lack of official status, in usage, "Maamme" fills the function of a national anthem in the same way as in many other countries. For example, it is played during state visits, and used to represent Finland at international sporting fixtures.

Through the late months of 1993, an instrumental version of Maamme was used as the entrance theme in WWF for wrestler Ludvig Borga.

== Lyrics ==
The original lyrics consist of eleven verses, but it is customary to only sing the first verse and the last verse unless the people gathered are mixed Finnish- and Swedish-speaking. In the latter case, three verses are sung: the first in Finnish, the first in Swedish and the last in Finnish.

Swedish original

Vårt land, vårt land, vårt fosterland,
Ljud högt, o dyra ord!
𝄆 Ej lyfts en höjd mot himlens rand,
Ej sänks en dal, ej sköljs en strand,
Mer älskad än vår bygd i nord,
Än våra fäders jord. 𝄇

Vårt land är fattigt, skall så bli
För den, som guld begär.
𝄆 En främling far oss stolt förbi:
Men detta landet älska vi,
För oss med moar, fjäll och skär
Ett guldland dock det är. 𝄇

Vi älska våra strömmars brus
Och våra bäckars språng.
𝄆 Den mörka skogens dystra sus,
Vår stjärnenatt, vårt sommarljus.
Allt, allt, vad här som syn, som sång
Vårt hjärta rört en gång. 𝄇

Här striddes våra fäders strid
Med tanke, svärd och plog.
𝄆 Här, här, i klar som mulen tid.
Med lycka hård, med lycka blid.
Det finska folkets hjärta slog.
Här bars vad det fördrog. 𝄇

Vem täljde väl de striders tal.
Som detta folk bestod.
𝄆 Då kriget röt från dal till dal.
Då frosten kom med hungers kval.
Vem mätte allt dess spillda blod
Och allt dess tålamod? 𝄇

Och det var här det blodet flöt,
Ja, här för oss det var,
𝄆 Och det var här sin fröjd det njöt,
Och det var här sin suck det göt.
Det folk som våra bördor bar
Långt före våra dar. 𝄇

Här är oss ljuvt, här är oss gott,
Här är oss allt beskärt;
𝄆 Hur ödet kastar än vår lott.
Ett land, ett fosterland vi fått,
Vad finns på jorden mera värt
Att hållas dyrt och kärt? 𝄇

Och här och här är detta land.
Vårt öga ser det här,
𝄆 Vi kunna sträcka ut vår hand
Och visa glatt på sjö och strand
Och säga: se det landet där.
Vårt fosterland det är. 𝄇

Och fördes vi att bo i glans
Bland guldmoln i det blå,
𝄆 Och blev vårt liv en stjärnedans.
Där tår ej göts, där suck ej fanns.
Till detta arma land ändå
Vår längtan skulle stå. 𝄇

O land, du tusen sjöars land,
Där sång och trohet byggt,
𝄆 Där livets hav oss gett en strand,
Vår forntids land, vår framtids land.
Var för din fattigdom ej skyggt.
Var fritt, var glatt, var tryggt. 𝄇

Din blomning, sluten än i knopp,
Skall mogna ur sitt tvång;
𝄆 Se, ur vår kärlek skall gå opp
Ditt ljus, din glans, din fröjd, ditt hopp.
Och högre klinga skall en gång
Vår fosterländska sång. 𝄇

IPA transcription (Note: See Help:IPA/Swedish and Swedish phonology.)

[ʋoːrt lɑnːd | ʋoːrt lɑnːd | ʋoːrt ˈfus.tær.lɑnːd |]
[jʉːd høkt | uː ˈdyː.rɑ uːrd ‖]
𝄆 [ei̯ lyfts en høi̯d muːt ˈhim.lens rɑnːd |]
[ei̯ seŋks en dɑːl | ei̯ ʃøls en strɑnːd |]
[meːr ˈel.skɑd en ʋoːr byɡd iː nuːrd |]
[en ˈʋoː.rɑ ˈfeː.dærs juːrd ‖] 𝄇

[ʋoːrt lɑnːd æːr ˈfɑ.tːiɡ | skɑlː soː bliː |]
[føːr den | som ɡʉld be.ˈjæːr ‖]
𝄆 [en ˈfrem.liŋ fɑːr osː stolt ˈfør.biː |]
[men ˈde.tːɑ ˈlɑnː.det ˈel.skɑ ʋiː ‖]
[føːr osː meːd ˈmuː.ɑr | fjelː ok ʃæːr |]
[etː ˈɡʉld.lɑnːd dokː deːt æːr ‖] 𝄇

[ʋiː ˈel.skɑ ˈʋoː.rɑ ˈstrø.mːɑrs brʉːs |]
[ok ˈʋoː.rɑ be.ˈkːɑrs sproŋ ‖]
𝄆 [den ˈmør.kɑ ˈskuː.ɡens ˈdys.trɑ |]
[ʋoːr ˈʃæːr.na.nɑtː | ʋoːrt ˈso.mːar.jʉːs ‖]
[ɑlːt | ɑlːt | ʋɑd hæːr som syn | som soŋ |]
[ʋoːrt ˈjær.tɑ rørt en ɡoŋ ‖] 𝄇

[hæːr ˈstri.dːes ˈʋoː.rɑ ˈfeː.dærs striːd |]
[meːd ˈtaŋː.ke | sʋæːrd ok pluːɡ ‖]
𝄆 [hæːr | hæːr | iː klɑːr som ˈmʉː.len tiːd |]
[meːd ˈly.kːɑ hoːrd | meːd ˈly.kːɑ bliːd ‖]
[deːt ˈfin.skɑ ˈfol.kets ˈjær.tɑ sluːɡ |]
[hæːr bɑrs ʋaːd deːt ˈfør.druːɡ ‖] 𝄇

[ʋem ˈtej.de ʋeːl de ˈstriː.dærs tɑːl |]
[som ˈde.tːɑ folːk be.ˈstuːd ‖]
𝄆 [doː ˈkri.ɡet røːt froːn daːl tilː daːl |]
[doː ˈfro.sten kom meːd ˈhʉŋ.ŋærs kʋɑːl ‖]
[ʋem ˈme.tːe alːt desː ˈspilː.dɑ bluːd |]
[ok alːt desː ˈtoː.lɑ.muːd ‖] 𝄇

[ok deːt ʋɑːr hæːr deːt ˈbluː.det fløːt |]
[jɑː hæːr føːr osː deːt ʋɑːr ‖]
𝄆 [ok deːt ʋɑːr hæːr sin frøi̯d deːt njøːt |]
[ok deːt ʋɑːr hæːr sin sʉkː deːt ɡøːt ‖]
[deːt folːk som ˈʋoː.rɑ ˈbør.duːr bɑːr |]
[loŋːt ˈføː.re ˈʋoː.rɑ dɑːr ‖] 𝄇

[hæːr æːr osː jʉʋt hæːr æːr osː ɡotː |]
[hæːr æːr osː alːt be.ˈskært ‖]
𝄆 [hʉːr ˈøː.det ˈkɑ.stɑr en ʋoːr lotː |]
[etː lɑnd etː ˈfus.tær.lɑnːd ʋi fotː ‖]
[ʋɑːd finːs poː ˈjuːr.den ˈmeː.rɑ ʋæːrt |]
[ɑtː ˈho.lːɑs dyrt ok kæːrt ‖] 𝄇

[ok hæːr ok hæːr æːr ˈde.tːɑ lɑnːd |]
[ʋoːrt ˈøː.ɡɑ seːr deːt hæːr ‖]
𝄆 [ʋi ˈkʉ.nːa ˈstre.kːɑ ʉːt ʋoːr hɑnːd |]
[ok ˈʋi.sɑ ɡlɑtː poː ʃøː ok strɑnːd ‖]
[ok ˈse.jːɑ seː deːt ˈlɑnː.det dæːr |]
[ʋoːrt ˈfus.tær.lɑnːd deːt æːr ‖] 𝄇

[ok ˈfør.des ʋi ɑt buː iː ɡlɑns |]
[blɑnːd ˈɡʉld.moln iː deːt bloː ‖]
𝄆 [ok bleːv ʋoːrt liːv en ˈʃæːr.ne.dɑns |]
[dæːr toːr ei̯ jøts dæːr sʉkː ei̯ fɑnːs ‖]
[tilː ˈde.tːɑ ˈɑːr.mɑ lɑnːd ˈen.doː |]
[ʋoːr ˈleŋ.tɑn ˈskʉ.lːe stoː ‖] 𝄇

[uː lɑnːd dʉː ˈtʉː.sen ˈʃøː.ɑrs lɑnːd |]
[dæːr soŋ ok ˈtruː.het bykːt ‖]
𝄆 [dæːr ˈli.vets hɑːʋ osː ɡetː en strɑnːd |]
[ʋoːr ˈfuːrn.tits lɑnːd ʋoːr ˈfrɑm.tits lɑnːd ‖]
[ʋɑːr føːr din ˈfa.tːiɡ.dom ei̯ ʃykːt |]
[ʋɑːr fritː ʋɑːr ɡlɑtː ʋɑːr trykːt ‖]

[din ˈblum.niŋ ˈslʉː.ten en iː knopː |]
[skɑlː ˈmuːɡ.nɑ ʉːr sitː tʋoŋ ‖]
𝄆 [seː ʉːr ʋoːr ˈtʃæːr.lek skɑlː ɡoː opː |]
[ditː jʉːs din ɡlɑns din frøi̯d ditː hopː ‖]
[ok ˈhøːɡ.re ˈkli.ŋːɑ skɑlː en ɡoŋ |]
[ʋoːr ˈfus.tær.lend.skɑ soŋ ‖] 𝄇

English verse translation from Swedish

Our land, our land, our Fatherland!
Ring out, dear word, oh sound!
𝄆 No rising hill, or mountain grand,
No sloping dale, no northern strand,
There is, more loved, to be found,
Than this — our fathers' ground. 𝄇

Our land is poor, and so shall be
To him who gold will crave.
𝄆 The strangers proudly pass, but we
Shall ever love this land, we see,
In moor, and fell, and isle and wave,
A golden land, so brave. 𝄇

We love our rippling brooks, so bright,
Our gushing streams, so strong,
𝄆 The whisper of dark woods, at night,
Our starry skies, our summer light,
All, all that we, in sight and song,
Have felt and lived among. 𝄇

Here fought our fathers, without fear,
With sword, and plough, and thought.
𝄆 And here, in clouded times, and clear,
With fortune in their front or rear,
Their Finnish hearts have beat, and wrought
And borne what bear they ought. 𝄇

Who tells, of all the fights, the tale,
In which this folk withstood,
𝄆 When war did rage from dale to dale,
When frost set in, with hunger's wail?
Who measured all their pouring blood,
And all their patience good? 𝄇

And it was here their blood was shed,
For us, here, on this shore;
𝄆 And it was here their joys were bred,
Here, that their sighs were heaved and fled,
That people's who our burdens bore
Before us, long before. 𝄇

Here it is sweet and good, we wot,
All, too, is giv'n us here;
𝄆 However fate may cast our lot,
A land, a fatherland, we've got.
Will there a thing on earth appear
More worthy, to hold dear? 𝄇

And here's, and here's this fatherland,
Here every eye it sees;
𝄆 And we can stretch a pointing hand,
To show, with joy, its sea and strand,
And say, "Behold this country, this,
Our Fatherland it is." 𝄇

And if we once were made to rise
To gold clouds, from below,
𝄆 And if we moved in starry skies,
Where no one weeps, where no one sighs,
To this poor lonely country, though,
Our longing hearts would go. 𝄇

Oh land, the thousand lakes' own land,
Of faith, and lay, and glee,
𝄆 Where life's main sea gave us a strand,
Our fore-time's land, our future's land,
Shy of thy poorness, never be,
Be calm, be glad, be free! 𝄇

Thy blossom, hidden now from sight,
Shall burst its bud ere long.
𝄆 Lo! from our love, shall rise aright,
Thy sun, thy hope, thy joy, thy light,
And higher, once, more full and strong,
Shall ring Our Country's song. 𝄇

Finnish version

Oi maamme, Suomi, synnyinmaa,
soi, sana kultainen!
𝄆 Ei laaksoa, ei kukkulaa,
ei vettä rantaa rakkaampaa,
kuin kotimaa tää pohjoinen,
maa kallis isien! 𝄇

On maamme köyhä, siksi jää,
jos kultaa kaivannet
𝄆 Sen vieras kyllä hylkäjää,
mut meille kallein maa on tää,
sen salot, saaret, manteret,
ne meist on kultaiset. 𝄇

Ovatpa meille rakkahat
koskemme kuohuineen,
𝄆 ikuisten honkain huminat,
täht'yömme, kesät kirkkahat,
kaikk'kuvineen ja lauluineen
mi painui sydämeen. 𝄇

Täss auroin, miekoin, miettehin
isämme sotivat,
𝄆 kun päivä piili pilvihin
tai loisti onnen paistehin,
täss Suomen kansan vaikeimmat
he vaivat kokivat. 𝄇

Tään kansan taistelut ken voi
ne kertoella, ken?
𝄆 Kun sota laaksoissamme soi,
ja halla näläntuskan toi,
ken mittasi sen hurmehen
ja kärsimykset sen? 𝄇

Täss on sen veri virrannut
hyväksi meidänkin,
𝄆 täss iloaan on nauttinut
ja murheitansa huokaillut
se kansa, jolle muinaisin
kuormamme pantihin. 𝄇

Tääll' olo meill on verraton
ja kaikki suotuisaa,
𝄆 vaikk onni mikä tulkohon,
maa isänmaa se meillä on.
Mi maailmass on armaampaa
ja mikä kalliimpaa? 𝄇

Ja tässä, täss' on tämä maa,
sen näkee silmämme.
𝄆 me kättä voimme ojentaa
ja vettä rantaa osoittaa
ja sanoa: kas tuoss' on se,
maa armas isäimme. 𝄇

Jos loistoon meitä saatettais
vaikk' kultapilvihin,
𝄆 mis itkien ei huoattais,
vaan tärkein riemun sielu sais,
ois tähän köyhään kotihin
halumme kuitenkin. 𝄇

Totuuden, runon kotimaa
maa tuhatjärvinen
𝄆 miss' elämämme suojan saa,
sa muistojen, sa toivon maa,
ain ollos, onnees tyytyen,
vapaa ja iloinen. 𝄇

Sun kukoistukses kuorestaan
kerrankin puhkeaa,
𝄆 viel lempemme saa nousemaan
sun toivos, riemus loistossaan,
ja kerran, laulus synnyinmaa
korkeemman kaiun saa. 𝄇

IPA transcription (Note: See Help:IPA/Finnish and Finnish phonology.)

[oi̯ ˈmɑːm.me ˈs̠uo̯.mi ˈs̠yn.nyi̯n.ˌmɑː |]
[s̠oi̯ ˈs̠ːɑ.nɑ ˈkul.tɑi̯.nen ‖]
𝄆 [ei̯ ˈlɑːk.s̠o.ɑ ei̯ ˈkuk̚.ku.lɑː |]
[ei̯ ˈʋet̚.tæ ˈrɑn.tɑː ˈrɑk̚.kɑːm.pɑː ‖]
[ˈkui̯n ˈko.ti.mɑː tæː ˈpoh.joi̯.nen |]
[mɑː ˈkɑl.lis̠ ˈi.s̠i.en ‖] 𝄇

[on ˈmɑːm.me ˈkøy̯.hæ ˈs̠ik.s̠i jæː |]
[jos̠ ˈkul.tɑː ˈkɑi̯.ʋɑn.net ‖]
𝄆 [s̠en ˈʋie̯.rɑs̠ ˈkyl.læ ˈhyl.kæ.jæː |]
[mut ˈmei̯l.le ˈkɑl.lei̯n mɑː on tæː ‖]
[s̠en ˈs̠ɑ.lot ˈs̠ɑː.ret ˈmɑn.te.ret |]
[ne ˈmei̯s̠.t‿on ˈkul.tɑi̯.s̠et ‖] 𝄇

[ˈo.ʋɑt.pɑ ˈmei̯l.le ˈrɑk̚.kɑ.hɑt |]
[ˈkos̠.kem.me ˈkuo̯.hui̯.neːn ‖]
𝄆 [ˈi.kui̯s̠.ten ˈhoŋ.kɑi̯n ˈhu.mi.nɑt |]
[ˈtæht.ˌyø̯m.me ˈke.s̠æt ˈkirk̚.kɑ.hɑt ‖]
[ˈkɑi̯k.ˌku.ʋi.neːn jɑ ˈlɑu̯.lui̯.neːn |]
[mi ˈpɑi̯.nui̯ ˈs̠y.dæ(m).meːn ‖] 𝄇

[ˈtæ.s̠‿ˈɑu̯.roi̯n ˈmie̯.koi̯n ˈmie̯t̚.te.hin |]
[ˈi.s̠æm.me ˈs̠o.ti.ʋɑt ‖]
𝄆 [kun ˈpæi̯.ʋæ ˈpiː.li ˈpil.ʋi.hin |]
[tɑi̯ ˈloi̯s̠.ti ˈon.nen ˈpɑi̯s̠.te.hin ‖]
[tæs̠‿ˈs̠uo̯.men ˈkɑn.s̠ɑn ˈʋɑi̯.kei̯m.mɑt |]
[he ˈʋɑi̯.ʋɑt ˈko.ki.ʋɑt ‖] 𝄇

[tæn ˈkɑn.s̠ɑn ˈtɑi̯s̠.te.lut ken ʋoi̯ |]
[ne ˈker.to.el.lɑ ken ‖]
𝄆 [kun ˈs̠o.tɑ ˈlɑːk.s̠oi̯s̠.s̠ɑm.me s̠oi̯ |]
[jɑ ˈhɑl.lɑ ˈnæ.læn.ˌtus̠.kɑn toi̯ ‖]
[ken ˈmit̚.ta.s̠i s̠en ˈhur.me.hen |]
[jɑ ˈkær.s̠i.myk.s̠et s̠en ‖] 𝄇

[ˈtæs̠.s̠‿on s̠en ˈʋe.ri ˈʋir.rɑn.nut |]
[ˈhy.ʋæk.s̠i ˈmei̯.dæŋ.kin ‖]
𝄆 [ˈtæs̠.s̠‿ˈi.lo.ɑːn on ˈnɑu̯t̚.ti.nut |]
[jɑ ˈmur.hei̯.tɑn.s̠ɑ ˈhuo̯.kɑi̯l.lut ‖]
[s̠e ˈkɑn.s̠ɑ ˈjol.le ˈmui̯.nɑi̯.s̠in |]
[ˈkuo̯r.mɑm.me ˈpɑn.ti.hin ‖] 𝄇

[ˈtæːl.l‿ˈo.lo ˈmei̯l.l‿on ˈʋer.rɑ.ton |]
[jɑ ˈkɑi̯k̚.ki ˈs̠uo̯.tui̯.s̠aː ‖]
𝄆 [ˈʋɑi̯k̚.k‿ˈon.ni ˈmi.kæ ˈtul.ko.hon |]
[mɑː ˈi.s̠æn.mɑː s̠e ˈmei̯l.læ on ‖]
[mi ˈmɑː.il.mɑs̠.s̠‿on ˈɑr.mɑːm.pɑː |]
[jɑ ˈmi.kæ ˈkɑl.liːm.pɑː ‖] 𝄇

[jɑ ˈtæs̠.s̠æ ˈtæs̠.s̠‿on ˈtæ.mæ mɑː |]
[s̠en ˈnæ.keː ˈs̠il.mæm.me ‖]
𝄆 [me ˈkæt̚.tæ ˈʋoi̯m.me ˈo.jen.tɑː |]
[jɑ ˈʋet̚.tæ ˈrɑn.tɑː ˈo.s̠oi̯t.tɑː ‖]
[jɑ ˈs̠ɑ.no.ɑ kɑs̠ ˈtuo̯s̠.s̠‿on s̠e |]
[mɑː ˈɑr.mɑs̠ ˈi.s̠æi̯m.me ‖] 𝄇

[jos̠ ˈloi̯s̠.toːn ˈmei̯.tæ ˈs̠aː.tet̚.tɑi̯s̠ |]
[ˈʋɑi̯k ˈkul.tɑ.pil.ʋi.hin ‖]
𝄆 [mis̠ ˈit.kie̯n ei̯ ˈhuo̯.ɑt̚.tɑi̯s̠ |]
[ʋɑːn ˈtær.kei̯n ˈrie̯.mun ˈs̠ie̯.lu s̠ɑi̯s̠ ‖]
[oi̯s̠ ˈtæ.hæn ˈkøy̯.hæːn ˈko.ti.hin |]
[ˈhɑ.lum.me ˈkui̯.teŋ.kin ‖] 𝄇

[ˈto.tuː.den ˈru.non ko.ti.mɑː |]
[mɑː ˈtu.hɑt.ˌjær.ʋi.nen ‖]
𝄆 [ˈmis̠.s̠‿ˈe.læ.mæm.me ˈs̠uo̯.jɑn s̠ɑː |]
[s̠ɑ ˈmui̯s̠.to.jen s̠ɑ ˈtoi̯.ʋon mɑː ‖]
[ɑi̯n ˈol.los̠ ˈon.neːs̠ ˈtyː.ty.en |]
[ˈʋɑ.pɑː jɑ ˈi.loi̯.nen ‖] 𝄇

[s̠un ˈku.koi̯s̠.tuk.s̠es̠ ˈkuo̯.res̠.tɑːn |]
[ˈker.rɑŋ.kim ˈpuh.ke.ɑː ‖]
𝄆 [ˈʋie̯l ˈlem.pem.me s̠ɑː ˈnou̯.s̠e.mɑːn |]
[s̠un ˈtoi̯.ʋos̠ ˈrie̯.mus̠ ˈloi̯s̠.tos̠.s̠ɑːn ‖]
[jɑ ˈker.rɑn ˈlɑu̯.lus̠ ˈs̠yn.nyi̯n.mɑː |]
[ˈkor.keːm.mɑn ˈkɑi̯.un ˈs̠ɑː ‖] 𝄇

== Music ==
Music score with the first verse in Swedish and Finnish.

== See also ==
- Finnish national symbols
- Finnish literature
- Finland-Swedish literature
- "Ålänningens sång" – the regional anthem of Åland
- "Modersmålets sång" – unofficial anthem of the Swedish-speaking Finns
- Public holidays in Finland
