= Min izāmō =

Ethnic anthem of the Livonians

English: "My Fatherland"
- Ethnic anthem of the Livonians
- Lyrics: Kōrli Stalte, 1923
- Music: Fredrik (Friedrich) Pacius, 1848

Audio sample
- Min izāmō (instrumental): file; help

"Min izāmō" ("My Fatherland"; Latvian: Mana tēvzeme) is the ethnic anthem of the Livonians. The words were written by Kōrli Stalte (1870–1947), a poet and spiritual leader of Livonians, to an earlier melody composed by Fredrik Pacius (the same melody used for the anthems of Finland and Estonia). The anthem was first sung by the Livonian Union’s four-part choir at the Livonian flag-raising celebration in the fall of 1923.

== Lyrics ==
Livonian original

Min izāmō, min sindimō,
ūod ārmaz rānda sa,
kus rāndanaigās kazābõd
vel vanād, vizād piedāgõd.
Min ārmaz īlmas ūod set sa,
min tõurõz izāmō!

Min izāmō, min sindimō,
ūod ārmaz rānda sa,
kus lāinõd mierstõ vīerõbõd
ja rāndan sūdõ āndabõd.
Min ārmaz īlmas ūod set sa,
min tõurõz izāmō!

Min izāmō, min sindimō,
ūod ārmaz rānda sa,
kus jelābõd īd kalāmīed,
kis mīer pǟl ātõ pǟvad īed.
Min ārmaz īlmas ūod set sa,
min tõurõz izāmō!

Min izāmō, min sindimō,
ūod ārmaz rānda sa,
kus kūltõb um vel pivā ēļ
– min amā ārmaz rāndakēļ.
Min ārmaz īlmas ūod set sa,
min tõurõz izāmō!

Latvian

Ai tēvzeme, ai dzimtene
un mīļā jūra te,
kur krastā sīkstas, šalcošas
vēl vecās priedes līgojas.
Vismīļākā man pasaulē
tu, dārgā tēvzeme.

Ai tēvzeme, ai dzimtene
un mīļā jūra te,
no kuras viļņi ceļu rod
šurp smilšu krastam muti dot.
Vismīļākā man pasaulē
tu, dārgā tēvzeme.

Ai tēvzeme, ai dzimtene
un mīļā jūra te,
kur zvejnieki vien dzīvot var,
kas dienā, naktī viļņus ar.
Vismīļākā man pasaulē
tu, dārgā tēvzeme.

Ai tēvzeme, ai dzimtene
un mīļā jūra te,
kur jūrmalnieku valoda
vissvētākā vēl dzirdama.
Vismīļākā man pasaulē
tu, dārgā tēvzeme.

English

My fatherland, land of my birth,
You, my beloved coast,
Where on the shore still grow
Ancient, strong pines.
In this world only you are dear to me,
My precious fatherland.

My fatherland, land of my birth,
You, my beloved coast,
Where waves roll out from the sea
Offering their mouths to the shore.
In this world only you are dear to me,
My precious fatherland.

My fatherland, land of my birth,
You, my beloved coast,
Where fishermen still live,
Who spend day and night at sea.
In this world only you are dear to me,
My precious fatherland.

My fatherland, land of my birth,
You, my beloved coast,
Where that sacred voice still is heard,
In my most cherished coast dwelling tongue.
In this world only you are dear to me,
My precious fatherland.

== See also ==
- "Maamme"
- "Mu isamaa, mu õnn ja rõõm"
