= Paavo Cajander =

Finnish poet and translator

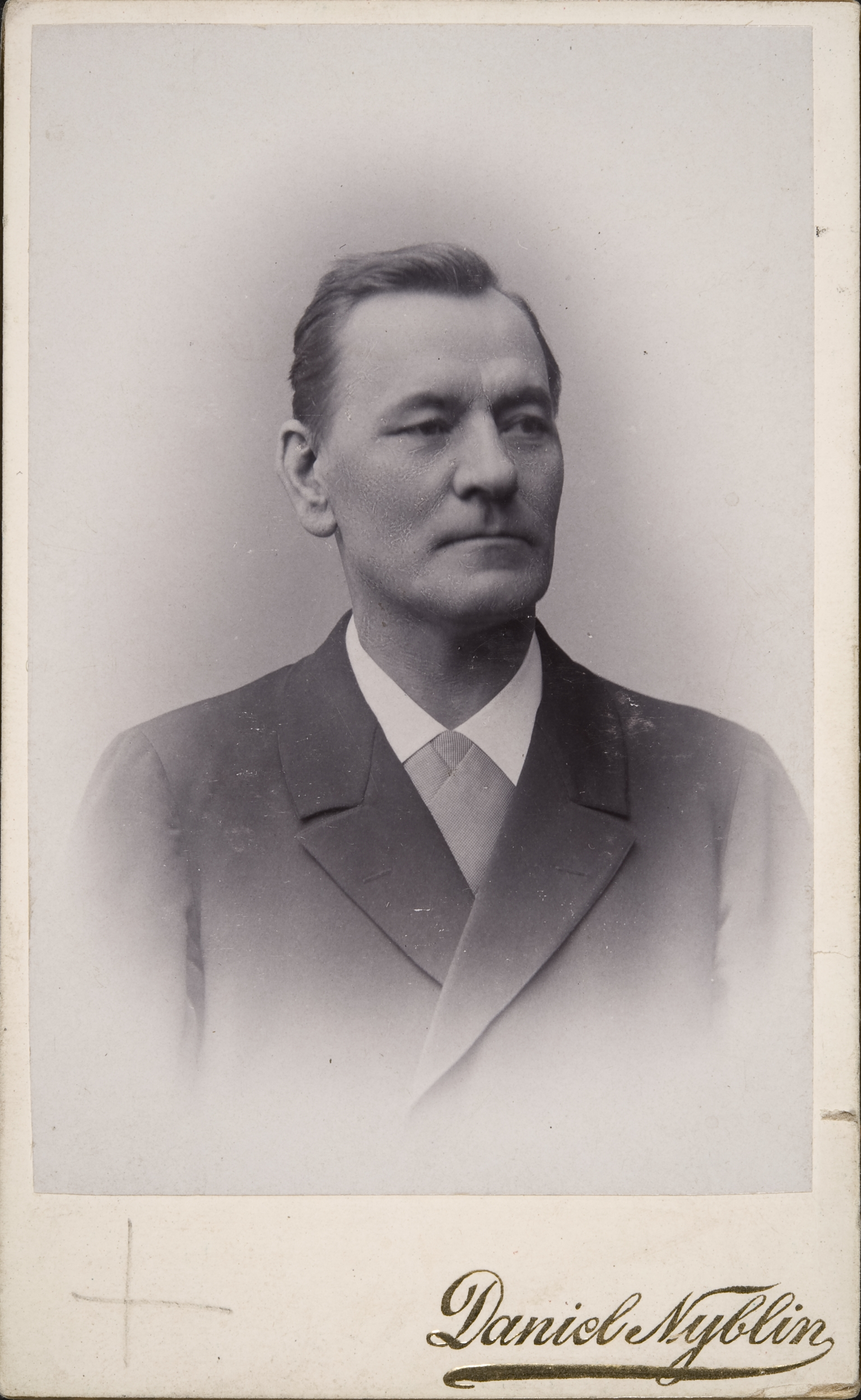
Paavo Cajander

Paavo Emil Cajander (24 December 1846 – 14 June 1913) was a Finnish poet and translator.

Cajander was born in Hämeenlinna on December 24, 1846, to Frans Henrik Cajander and Maria Sofia Ylén. He was renowned for his translation into Finnish of Shakespeare's works and of Johan Ludvig Runeberg's epic poem The Tales of Ensign Stål, whose first verse is currently the unofficial Finnish national anthem. Cajander died in Helsinki on June 14, 1913, and is buried at the Hietaniemi Cemetery.

== Publications ==
- Tervehdyssanoja armollisimmalla luvalla 30 p. Toukokuuta v. 1890 seppelöidyille sadalle seitsemällekymmenelle neljälle filosofian maisterille (1890)
- Valikoima runoelmia (1898)
- Runoelmia (1914)
