= Euro gold and silver commemorative coins (Ireland) =

Ireland Éire

This article covers euro gold and silver commemorative coins issued by the Central Bank and Financial Services Authority of Ireland. It also covers rare cases of collectors coins (coins not planned for normal circulation) minted using other precious metals. It does not cover either the Irish €2 commemorative coins or the Irish Pound commemorative coins.

For euro gold and silver commemorative coins of other countries see Euro gold and silver commemorative coins.

== Listed by year ==
=== 2003 coinage ===
Special Olympics World Summer Games			
Designer: -		Mint:	
Value: €5	Alloy: Cu 750 Ni 250	Quantity: 60,000	Quality: BU
Issued: -	Diameter: 28.4 mm	Weight: 14.19 g	Market Value: -
Special Olympics World Summer Games, 2003			
Designer: Veronica McCallion & Tricia Holbrook -		Mint:	
Value: €10	Alloy: Ag 925	Quantity: 30,000	Quality: Proof
Issued: -	Diameter: 38.61 mm	Weight: 28.28 g	Market Value: €45
The obverse depicts the Irish harp surrounded by stars The reverse design features the logo of the 2003 Special Olympics World Summer Games

=== 2004 coinage ===
European Union Accession			
Designer: Thomas Emmet Mullins & Paul Regan		Mint:	
Value: €10	Alloy: Ag 925	Quantity: 50,000	Quality: Proof
Issued: 08/04/2004	Diameter: 38.61 mm	Weight: 28.28 g	Market Value: -
The obverse depicts the Irish harp surrounded by the names of the ten accession countries in their own official languages The reverse design features a swan nesting ten eggs representing the EU welcoming ten new countries into the fold. The coin was part of the Europa coin programme's 2004 Theme EU enlargement.

=== 2005 coinage ===
Sir William Rowan Hamilton Birth 200th Anniversary			
Designer: Michael Guilfoyle		Mint:	
Value: €10	Alloy: Ag 925	Quantity: 30,000	Quality: Proof
Issued: 23/05/2005	Diameter: 38.61 mm	Weight: 28.28 g	Original Value: €32.00; Market Value: -
The obverse depicts the Irish harp and the inscription "The Hamilton Year Of Science" The reverse design features the nabla symbol surrounded by a decorative pattern formed from symbols and the inscription "Sir William Rowan Hamilton 1805-1865"

=== 2006 coinage ===
Samuel Beckett Birth 100th Anniversary			
Designer: Emmet Mullins		Mint: B.H. Mayer's Kunstprageanstalt GmbH - Germany	
Value: €20	Alloy: Au	Quantity: 20,000	Quality: Proof
Issued: 02/05/2006	Diameter: 13.92 mm	Weight: 1.24 g	Market Value:
Samuel Beckett Birth 100th Anniversary			
Designer: Emmet Mullins		Mint: B.H. Mayer's Kunstprageanstalt GmbH - Germany	
Value: €10	Alloy: Ag 925	Quantity: 35,000	Quality: Proof
Issued: 02/05/2006	Diameter: 38.61 mm	Weight: 28.28 g	Market Value:
Obverse: Brian Boru harp, above- inscription "Samuel Beckett 1906 - 1989", below- 'éire' + date. Reverse: design features an image of Beckett with a scene of his most famous work ‘Waiting for Godot’ The coins were designed by Emmet Mullins who won a national design competition held in 2005. The coin was part of the Europa coin programme's 2006 Theme Distinguished European figures.

=== 2007 coinage ===
Ireland's influence on European Celtic culture			
Designer: Mary Gregoriy		Mint: B.H. Meyer's Kunstprageanstalt GmbH	
Value: €20	Alloy: Au 999	Quantity: 25,000	Quality: Proof
Issued: 11/09/2007	Diameter: 13.92 mm	Weight: 1.244 g	Market Value:
Ireland's Influence on European Celtic culture			
Designer: Mary Gregoriy		Mint: B.H. Meyer's Kunstprageanstalt GmbH	
Value: €10	Alloy: Ag 925	Quantity: 35,000	Quality: Proof
Issued: 11/09/2007	Diameter: 38.61 mm	Weight: 28.28 g	Original Value: €35.00; Market Value:
Obverse: Brian Boru harp, left- 'éire', right- date. Reverse: Four metamorphic figures in a cruciform arrangement in animated conversation with each figure holding in its hand an item that references a different aspect of how Ireland has influenced and inspired European Celtic culture: literature, music, construction & new technology. rim- denomination (7 times) & Eurostar mark (1 time). The coin was part of the Europa coin programme's 2007 Theme European Realisation. The coins were launched at a reception in the National Museum of Ireland, Collins Barracks, hosted by the Governor of the Central Bank of Ireland, John Hurley.
Ivan Meštrović's design			
Designer: Ivan Meštrović & Damir Mataušić'		Mint: Croatian Monetary Institute	
Value: €15	Alloy: Ag 925	Quantity: 10,000	Quality: Proof
Issued: 15/02/2007	Diameter: 37.00 mm	Weight: 24 g	Original Value: €40.00; Market Value:
Obverse: Female harpist playing the Dalway harp. Reverse: two shamrock leaves with date upper left and the Brian Boru harp lower right and two squares (taken from the Croatian crest), éire above, denomination below. The design, known as 'Girl with Harp' was prepared in 1927 by Ivan Meštrović (1883 - 1962), a Croatian Sculptor of international renown, as an entry in the competition for the design of the 1928 Irish Free State coinage. The design arrived too late for consideration. The Chairman of the Design Committee, William Butler Yeats, subsequently wrote "He made one magnificent design and, on discovering that the date had passed, gave it to the Irish Free State with great generosity" The design has been used as the seal of the Central Bank of Ireland since 1963. The €15 coin was produced with the permission and co-operation of the Meštrović Foundation in Croatia. In addition to the 8,000 individual €15 coins issued, a double proof coin set, limited to 2,000 sets, was also issued. The double coin set included the €15 silver proof coin as well as a 150 Kuna silver proof coin. This sister coin is identical to the Irish coin except for an inscription in Croatian and the Croatian crest in place of the shamrock. 1,000 sets were sold exclusively in Croatia while the other 1,000 sets were only available to purchase at the Dublin International Coin Fair held in the Royal Dublin Society on 16 & 17 February 2007.

=== 2008 coinage ===
UNESCO Heritage Site of Skellig Michael			
Designer: Michael Guilfoyle		Mint: Royal Dutch Mint, Utrecht	
Value: €20	Alloy: Au 999	Quantity: 15,000	Quality: Proof
Issued: 23/04/2008	Diameter: 13.92 mm	Weight: 1.244 g	Market Value:
UNESCO Heritage Site of Skellig Michael			
Designer: Michael Guilfoyle		Mint: Royal Dutch Mint, Utrecht	
Value: €10	Alloy: Ag 925	Quantity: 25,000	Quality: Proof
Issued: 23/04/2008	Diameter: 38.61 mm	Weight: 28.28 g	Original Value: €36.00; Market Value:
Obverse: Brian Boru harp, left- 'éire', right- date. Reverse: Sceilig Mhichil island with a flock of birds soaring from the summit towards 12 stars, left- Eurostar mark & denomination, legend- SCEILIG MHICHIL The coins were produced by the Central Bank in collaboration with the Office of Public Works and celebrate Sceilig Mhichíl, the UNESCO Heritage Site located off the west coast of Ireland. The coin was part of the Europa coin programme's 2008 Theme European Cultural Heritage.
International Polar Year			
Designer: Thomas Ryan		Mint: Münze Österreich AG, Vienna	
Value: €100	Alloy: Au 999	Quantity: 3,000	Quality: Proof
Issued: September	Diameter: 28 mm	Weight: 15.50 g	Original Value: €395.00; Market Value:
International Polar Year			
Designer: Thomas Ryan		Mint: Münze Österreich AG, Vienna	
Value: €5	Alloy: Ag 925	Quantity: 6,000	Quality: Proof
Issued: September	Diameter: 28 mm	Weight: 8.52 g	Original Value: €50.00; Market Value:
Obverse: Brian Boru harp, left- 'éire', right- date, lower-right- International Polar Year logo, all surrounded by a laurel wreath. Reverse: The coins feature the Antarctic explorers Sir Ernest Shackleton & Tom Crean

=== 2009 coinage ===
The Ploughman			
Designer: Emmet Mullins		Mint:	
Value: €20	Alloy: Au 999	Quantity: 10,000	Quality: Proof
Issued: 06/05/2009	Diameter: 13.92 mm	Weight: 1.00 g	Original Value: €55.00; Market Value:
The Ploughman			
Designer: Emmet Mullins		Mint:	
Value: €10	Alloy: Ag 925	Quantity: 10,000	Quality: Proof
Issued: 06/05/2009	Diameter: 38.61 mm	Weight: 28.28 g	Original Value: €36.00; Market Value:
Obverse: Reverse: This coin was launched on 6 May 2009 to celebrate the 80th anniversary of the introduction into circulation of The Consolidated Irish Banknotes Series also known as the Ploughman Banknotes. This product has an individual issue limit of 10,000 pieces & a Double Proof Set limit of 5,000 pieces. The designer of the coin, Emmet Mullins, has created a modern interpretation of the Ploughman Design from the original banknotes.
125 Years of the Gaelic Athletic Association (G.A.A.)			
Designer: Michael Guilfoyle		Mint:	
Value: €15	Alloy: Ag 925	Quantity: 10,000	Quality: Proof
Issued: 04/11/2009	Diameter: 38.6 mm	Weight: 28.2 g	Original Value: €36.00
Obverse: Reverse: The coin Celebrates the 125th Anniversary of the Gaelic Athletic Association (G.A.A.)

=== 2010 coinage ===
Gaisce - The President's Award			
Designer: Michael Guilfoyle		Mint: Origination and production by The Royal Dutch Mint, Utrecht	
Value: €20	Alloy: Au 999	Quantity: 10,000*	Quality: Proof
Issued: 28/04/2010	Diameter: 13.92 mm	Weight: 1.00 g	Original Value: €58.00; Market Value:
Gaisce - The President's Award			
Designer: Michael Guilfoyle		Mint: Origination and production by The Royal Dutch Mint, Utrecht	
Value: €10	Alloy: Ag 925	Quantity: 12,000*	Quality: Proof
Issued: 28/04/2010	Diameter: 38.61 mm	Weight: 28.28 g	Original Value: €36.00; Market Value:
* of which 4,000 gold and silver coins have been reserved for issue in the two-coin sets. Obverse: Traditionally depicting the 14 string Irish Harp modelled on the 'Brian Ború' harp in Trinity College, Dublin. This harp has been used on Irish coins since 1928 and on this coin it is surrounded by a laurel wreath to reflect the prestigious nature of Gaisce - The Presidents Award. Reverse: Depicts Áras an Uachtaráin, the official residence of the President of Ireland, the patron of Gaisce. It also features some of the diverse range of challenges that participants in the Award undertake.
The Animals of Irish Coinage series (Horse)			
Designer: Emmet Mullins		Mint: Origination and production by The Royal Dutch Mint	
Value: €15	Alloy: Ag 925	Quantity: 15,000	Quality: Proof
Issued: 13/09/2010	Diameter: 38.61 mm	Weight: 28.28 g	Original Value: €36.00; Market Value:
Obverse: Depicts a horse similar (if not exactly the same) to the original Percy Metcalfe Halfcrown, overlaid with a young horse rubbing against the Adult horse (possible mare and foal), above the rear of the adult horse is depicted 15 (line break) Euro. Reverse: Features the harp and the year of date 2010.

=== 2011 coinage ===
St. Brendan the Navigator			
Designer: Michael Guilfoyle		Mint:	
Value: €10	Alloy: Ag 925	Quantity: 15,000	Quality: Proof
Issued: 15/02/2011	Diameter:	Weight: 28.28 g	Original Value: €38
Obverse: Reverse:
Animal motifs on Irish coins (Salmon)			
Designer: Emmet Mullins		Mint: Royal Dutch Mint, Utrecht	
Value: €15	Alloy: Ag 925	Quantity: 12,000	Quality: Proof
Issued: 10/10/2011	Diameter: 38.61 mm	Weight: 28.28 g	Original Value: €46.00
Obverse: Depicts a Salmon similar (if not exactly the same) to the original Percy Metcalfe 2 Shillings / 10 Pence piece, overlaid with a young smolt against the Adult salmon, below the head of the adult salmon is depicted "15 Euro" in two lines. Reverse: Features the harp and the year of date 2011.
Celtic Cross			
Designer: Thomas Ryan		Mint:	
Value: €20	Alloy: Au 999	Quantity: 12,000	Quality: Proof
Issued: 18/04/2011	Diameter: 11 mm	Weight: 0.5 g	Original Value: €40
Obverse: Reverse:

=== 2012 coinage ===
Michael Collins			
Designer: Thomas Ryan		Mint:	
Value: €20	Alloy: Au 999	Quantity:	Quality: Proof
Issued: 15/08/2012	Diameter: 13.92 mm	Weight: 1.00 g	Original Value: Market Value:
Michael Collins			
Designer:		Mint:	
Value: €10	Alloy: Ag 925	Quantity:	Quality: Proof
Issued: 15/08/2012	Diameter: 38.61 mm	Weight: 28.28 g	Original Value: Market Value:
Obverse: Reverse:
European Artists (Jack B Yeats)			
Designer: Michael Guilfoyle		Mint:	
Value: €10	Alloy: Ag 925	Quantity: 12,000	Quality: Proof
Issued: 25/01/2012	Diameter:	Weight: 28.28 g	Original Value: €46.00
Obverse: Features the harp and the year of date 2012. Reverse: Depicts image of artist Jack B Yeats
Animal motifs on Irish coins (Irish Wolfhound)			
Designer: Emmett Mullins		Mint:	
Value: €15	Alloy: Ag 925	Quantity: 8,000	Quality: Proof
Issued: 12/12/2012	Diameter: 38.61 mm	Weight: 28.28 g	Original Value: €46.00
Obverse: Features the harp and the year of date 2012. Reverse: Depicts an Irish Wolfhound
Monastic Art (Book of Kells)			
Designer: Thomas Ryan		Mint:	
Value: €20	Alloy: Au 999	Quantity: 12,000	Quality: Proof
Issued: 09/05/2012	Diameter: 11.00 mm	Weight: 0.5 g	Original Value: €50
Obverse: Reverse: Depicts an image of monk writing the Book of Kells

=== 2013 coinage ===
European Writers (James Joyce)			
Designer: Mary Gregoriy		Mint:	
Value: €10	Alloy: Ag 925	Quantity: 10,000	Quality: Proof
Issued: 11/04/2013	Diameter:	Weight: 28.28 g	Original Value: €46.00
Obverse: Reverse: Depicts image of James Joyce with a quote that incorrectly inserted the word "that" Coin sold out on 2nd day of issue due to unprecedented demand.

100th anniversary of the Dublin Lockout			
Designer: Rory Breslin		Mint:	
Value: €15	Alloy: Ag 925	Quantity: 10,000	Quality: Proof
Issued: 24/09/2013	Diameter: 38.61 mm	Weight: 28.28 g	Original Value: €44.00
Obverse: Reverse:

=== 2014 coinage ===
A silver 10 Euro commemorating John McCormack (1884–1945), Irish tenor and Papal Count.

A gold 20 Euro commemorating the 1000th anniversary of the Battle of Clontarf.

A silver 15 Euro commemorating the centenary of the death of John Philip Holland (1840–1914), an Irish engineer regarded as the father of the modern submarine.

=== 2015 coinage ===
A silver 15 Euro Proof Coin commemorating Ernest Walton (1903–1995), an Irish physicist and 1951 Nobel laureate for being the first person to artificially split the atom.

A silver 15 Euro Proof Coin commemorating the 150th anniversary of the birth of W. B. Yeats, Irish poet and Nobel Laureate.

A silver 10 Euro Proof Coin commemorating the 70th anniversary of the end of World War II and the 70th anniversary of peace in Europe.

=== 2016 coinage ===
Centenary of the Easter Rising: a €15 silver coin and €50 gold coin, both depicting Hibernia.

A .925 sterling silver proof 10 Euros depicting architect and furniture designer Eileen Gray, the first woman to appear on an Irish commemorative coin, sold for €60 each. Some of these coins were found to be blemished, and the Central Bank offered a refund.

=== 2017 coinage ===
€15 silver proof coin depicting electrical engineer Sir Charles Algernon Parsons.

10 Euros silver proof coin depicting the Ha'penny Bridge.

15 Euros commemorating Gulliver's Travels, satirical 1726 novel by Irish author Jonathan Swift.

=== 2018 coinage ===
€15 Silver Proof to commemorate the 70th anniversary of Rory Gallagher's birth. (Part 1 of the "Modern Irish Musicians" series)

€15 Silver Proof Coin to Commemorate Bram Stoker’s Dracula.

€15 silver proof coin commemorating the centenary of women's suffrage.

=== 2019 coinage ===
€100 half-ounce gold proof coin to mark the centenary of the First Dáil.

€15 silver proof coin to mark the centenary of the transatlantic flight of Alcock and Brown, which landed in Ireland.

€15 silver proof coin to commemorate the 70th anniversary of Phil Lynott's birth. (Part 2 of the "Modern Irish Musicians" series)

=== 2021 coinage ===
€10 silver proof coin depicting Christ Church Cathedral, Dublin to commemorate Gothic architecture in Ireland. (part of the Europa coin programme)

=== 2022 coinage ===
€15 silver proof coin to commemorate the 80th anniversary of Luke Kelly's birth. (Part 3 of the "Modern Irish Musicians" series)

€15 silver proof coin to commemorate Kathleen Lynn.

€100 gold proof coin to mark the centenary of the foundation of the Irish Free State.

=== 2023 coinage ===
€15 silver proof coin to celebrate the achievements of the Republic of Ireland women's national football team, who qualified for the 2023 FIFA Women's World Cup.

€20 gold proof and €10 silver proof coin to celebrate the 50th anniversary of John F. Kennedy's visit to Ireland.

=== 2024 coinage ===
€15 silver proof coin to mark the 1500th anniversary of the death of Saint Brigid of Kildare.

€15 silver proof coin to mark the centenary of the Defence Forces.

=== 2025 coinage ===
€15 silver proof coin to mark the centenary of George Bernard Shaw's Nobel Prize in Literature.

€50 gold proof coin and €15 silver proof coin to mark the 250th birthday of Daniel O'Connell.

=== 2026 coinage ===
€15 silver proof coin to mark the centenary of Seán O'Casey's The Plough and the Stars.

€15 silver proof coin to commemorate author Maeve Binchy (1939–2012).

== See also ==
- Commemorative coins of Ireland
- €2 commemorative coins
- Ireland 2007 commemorative 2 euro coin
