= Euro gold and silver commemorative coins (Finland) =

Gold and silver issues of the euro commemorative coins in Finland

Republic of Finland (in Finnish) Suomen tasavalta (in Swedish) Republiken Finland
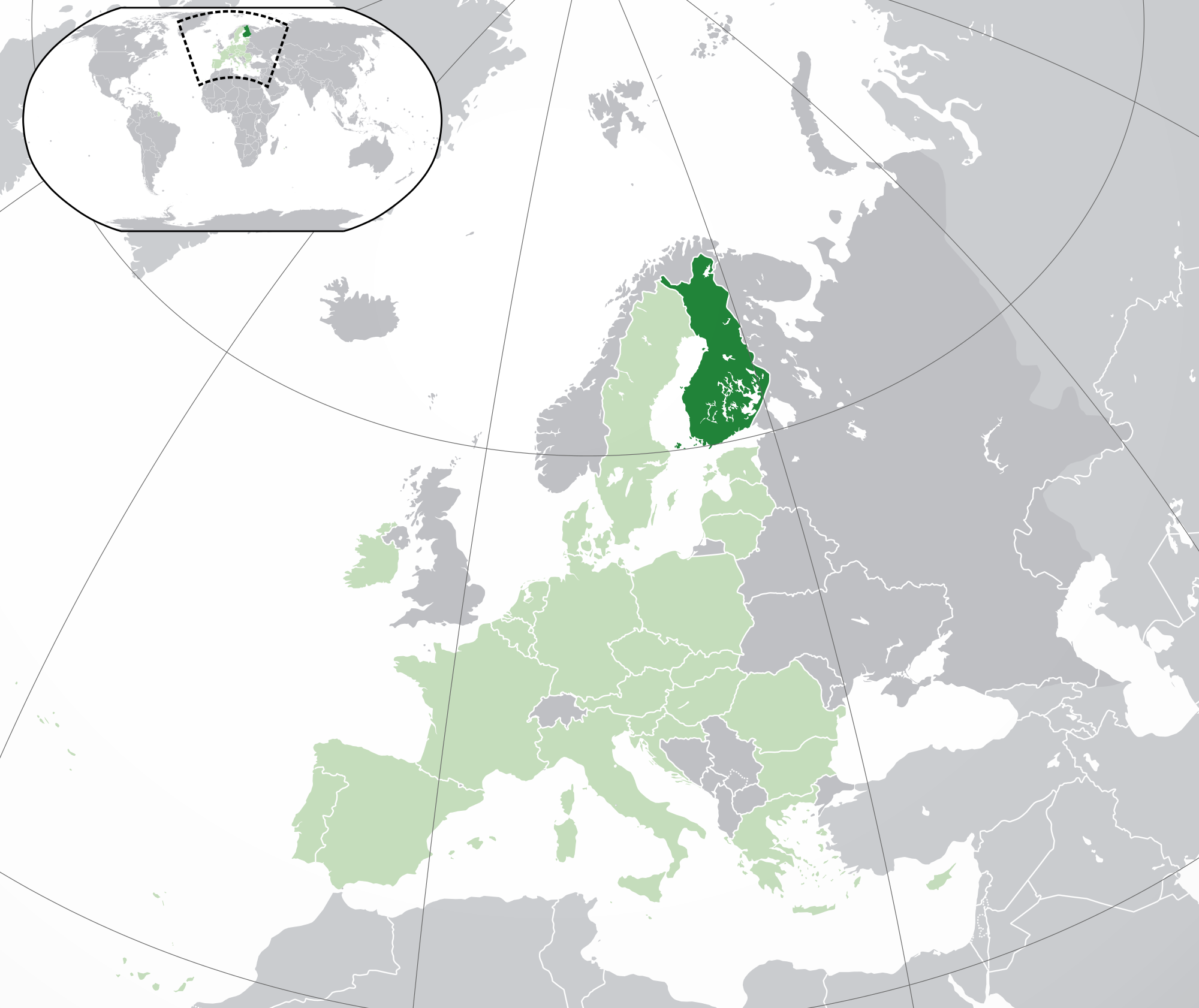

Euro gold and silver commemorative coins are special euro coins minted and issued by member states of the Eurozone, mainly in gold and silver, although other precious metals are also used in rare occasions. Finland was one of the first twelve countries in the Eurozone that introduced the euro (€) on 1 January 2002. Since then, the Mint of Finland Ltd. have been minting both normal issues of Finnish euro coins, which are intended for circulation, and commemorative euro coins in gold and silver.

These special coins have a legal tender only in Finland, unlike the normal issues of the Finnish euro coins, which have a legal tender in every country of the Eurozone. This means that the commemorative coins made of gold and silver cannot be used as money in other countries. Furthermore, as their bullion value generally vastly exceeds their face value, these coins are not intended to be used as means of payment at all—although it remains possible. For this reason, they are usually named Collectors' coins.

The coins usually commemorate the anniversaries of historical events or draw attention to current events of special importance. Finland mints four of these coins on average per year, in both gold and silver, with face value ranging from 5 to 100 euros.

== Summary ==
As of 2 October 2008, 26 variations of Finnish commemorative coins have been minted: three in 2002, four in 2003, three in 2004, four in 2005, five in 2006, four in 2007, four in 2008 and one in 2009 so far. These special high-value commemorative coins are not to be confused with €2 commemorative coins, which are coins designated for circulation and do have legal tender status in all countries of the Eurozone.

The following table shows the number of coins minted per year. In the first section, the coins are grouped by the metal used, while in the second section they are grouped by their face value.

Year	Issues	By metal			By face value				
Year	Issues	gold	silver	Others	€100	€50	€20	€10	€5
2002	3	1	2	–	1	–	–	2	–
2003	4	1	2	1	–	1	–	2	1
2004	3	1	2	–	1	–	–	2	–
2005	4	1	2	1	–	–	1	2	1
2006	5	1	2	2	–	1	–	2	2
2007	4	1	2	1	1	–	–	2	1
2008	4	1	2	1	1	–	–	2	1
2009	1	–	1	–	–	–	–	1	–
Total	28	7	15	6	4	2	1	15	6
Coins were minted / No coins were minted

== 2002 coinage ==
First Finnish gold euro			
Designer: Toivo Jaatinen		Mint: Mint of Finland Ltd.	
Value: €100	Alloy: Au 900 (Gold)	Quantity: 25,000	Quality: Proof
Issued: 2002	Diameter: 22 mm (0.87 in)	Weight: 8.64 g (0.30 oz; 0.28 ozt)	Market value: €295
This coin is also called Gold Mining in Lapland. On the obverse, it shows a waterfall in a forest. On the reverse, the midnight sun above a lake in Lapland can be observed.
Elias Lönnrot and folklore			
Designer: Pertti Mäkinen		Mint: Mint of Finland Ltd.	
Value: €10	Alloy: Ag 925 (Silver)	Quantity: 40,000; 40,000	Quality: BU; Proof
Issued: 2002	Diameter: 38.61 mm (1.52 in)	Weight: 27.4 g (0.97 oz; 0.88 ozt)	Market value: €35-€45 €39.95
The obverse depicts a woven ribbon with the twelve stars of Europe. Finland in Finnish (Suomi) and Swedish are displayed at the bottom of the coin, with the face value of 10 euro in the right up corner. On the reverse, a feather (as a symbol of an author) and Elias Lönnrot's signature can be seen. The Finnish word kansanrunous (People's Poetry) can be observed on this side of the coin.
50th anniversary of the Helsinki Olympic Games			
Designer: Erkki Vainio & Hannu Veijalainen		Mint: Mint of Finland Ltd.	
Value: €10	Alloy: Ag 925 (Silver)	Quantity: 10,000; 34,800	Quality: BU; Proof
Issued: 2002	Diameter: 38.61 mm (1.52 in)	Weight: 27.4 g (0.97 oz; 0.88 ozt)	Market value: €44.95 €44.95
In the Obverse, the Olympic Flame above the Earth can be seen. Note that Finland is the only country highlighted on earth, as a representation of the host of these games. On the reverse, a view of the Helsinki Olympic Stadium can be seen. On the right, the 500 markka commemorative coin minted in 1952 celebrating the occasion is depicted.

== 2003 coinage ==
Ice Hockey World Championships 2003			
Designer: Pertti Mäkinen		Mint: Mint of Finland Ltd.	
Value: €5	Alloy: Disk: Cu (Copper) & Ni (Nickel); Ring: Al (Aluminium) & Pr (Bronze)	Quantity: 150,000	Quality: BU
Issued: 2003	Diameter: 35 mm (1.38 in)	Weight: 20.2 g (0.71 oz; 0.65 ozt)	Market value: €25
In the obverse, a lake landscape with three trees can be observed. Finland in Finnish and Swedish, with the face value of 5 euro are depicted in the bottom part of the coin. On the reverse, three ice hockey sticks with a puck can be seen. Notice the number of elements (three) repeated twice, in both sides of the coin, as a representation of the year this coin was minted.
Finnish Numismatic Art			
Designer: Matti Peltokangas		Mint: Mint of Finland Ltd.	
Value: €50	Alloy: Disk: Au 750 (Gold); Ring: Ag 925 (Silver)	Quantity: 10,600	Quality: Proof
Issued: 2003	Diameter: 27.25 mm (1.07 in)	Weight: 12.8 g (0.45 oz; 0.41 ozt)	Market value: €250-€290
The snowflake featured on both sides of the coin symbolizes the country's northern location, where the designs spill over from the gold core to the silver ring. The beads around the border are a traditional design element in Finnish numismatic art, dating back to the gold coins of 1878. The reverse features another design of snowflake surrounded by beads.
Anders Chydenius			
Designer: Tero Lounas		Mint: Mint of Finland Ltd.	
Value: €10	Alloy: Ag 925 (Silver)	Quantity: 30,000; 30,000	Quality: BU; Proof
Issued: 26 February 2003	Diameter: 38.60 mm (1.52 in)	Weight: 27.40 g (0.97 oz; 0.88 ozt)	Market value: €33-€65 €38.95
This commemorative coin was minted in honour of the life work of Anders Chydenius. The year 2003 marked the 200th anniversary of the death of Chydenius, who served as, among other things, a priest, economist, and parliament member. The obverse features an open book, referring to Chydenius's numerous publications and the Bible. A traditional village with a church and other buildings can be seen on the reverse.
Mannerheim and Saint Petersburg			
Designer: Anneli Sipiläinen		Mint: Mint of Finland Ltd.	
Value: €10	Alloy: Ag 925 (Silver)	Quantity: 7,100; 27,900	Quality: BU; Proof
Issued: 2003	Diameter: 39.60 mm (1.56 in)	Weight: 27.40 g (0.97 oz; 0.88 ozt)	Market value: €33-€69 €40-€65
The obverse of the coin features a portrait of Marshal Carl Gustaf Emil Mannerheim. The reverse of the coin features a view of Saint Petersburg, with the Peter and Paul Fortress and its three turrets. In the coin the words "St. Petersburg 1703–2003" can be seen.

== 2004 coinage ==
Albert Edelfelt and painting			
Designer: Pertti Mäkinen		Mint: Mint of Finland Ltd.	
Value: €100	Alloy: Au 900 (Gold)	Quantity: 15,000	Quality: Proof
Issued: 2004	Diameter: 22 mm (0.87 in)	Weight: 8.64 g (0.30 oz; 0.28 ozt)	Market value: €250-€340
The obverse of the coin features a hanging flower and a corner of a fan, both symbols of beauty. The reverse shows an embossed face of the artist.
Johan Ludvig Runeberg and Finnish Poetry			
Designer: Heli Kauhanen		Mint: Mint of Finland Ltd.	
Value: €10	Alloy: Ag 925 (Silver)	Quantity: 6,500; 23,500	Quality: BU; Proof
Issued: 2004	Diameter: 38.60 mm (1.52 in)	Weight: 27.40 g (0.97 oz; 0.88 ozt)	Market value: €33-€50 €38.5
The obverse of the coin features a stylized portrait of Runeberg's face. The reverse features an 1831 font sample from Helsingfors Tidningar – a Swedish-language newspaper – since Runeberg wrote most of his work in Swedish, representing his versatile literary talent.
Tove Jansson and Finnish Children's Culture			
Designer: Pertti Mäkinen		Mint: Mint of Finland Ltd.	
Value: €10	Alloy: Ag 925 (Silver)	Quantity: 50,000; 20,000	Quality: BU; Proof
Issued: 2004	Diameter: 38.60 mm (1.52 in)	Weight: 27.40 g (0.97 oz; 0.88 ozt)	Market value: €33-€51 €38.95
The obverse depicts Tove Jansson, the skyline, an artist's palette, a crescent, and a sailboat. The reverse design features three Moomin characters; Moomintroll, The Snork Maiden, and Little My.

== 2005 coinage ==
10th IAAF World Championships in Athletics			
Designer: Pertti Mäkinen		Mint: Mint of Finland Ltd.	
Value: €20	Alloy: Au 900 (Gold)	Quantity: 30,000	Quality: Proof
Issued: 17 May 2005	Diameter: 13.9 mm (0.55 in)	Weight: 1.73 g (0.06 oz; 0.06 ozt)	Market value: €90
This coin was the first coin celebrating the 10th IAAF World Championships in Athletics arranged in Helsinki in August 2005. The coin was issued in a sporty atmosphere. The coin was launched by javelin thrower Aki Parviainen and hammer thrower Olli-Pekka Karjalainen. The obverse of the coin features Helsinki Olympic Stadium and above the stadium random waves express the feeling of the games. On the reverse are two faces with twelve euro stars on their hairs.
10th IAAF World Championships in Athletics			
Designer: Tapio Kettunen		Mint: Mint of Finland Ltd.	
Value: €5	Alloy: Center: Cu (Copper) & Ni (Nickel); Ring: Al (Aluminium) & Pr (Bronze)	Quantity: 175,000	Quality: BU
Issued: 04.08.2005	Diameter: 35 mm (1.38 in)	Weight: 19.8 g (0.70 oz; 0.64 ozt)	Market value: €14.95
This coin was minted to celebrate Finland's World Champion's in Athletics tournament. Fitting into the theme, on the obverse of the coin, a javelin thrower is depicted. On the reverse, legs of hurdle runners with the Helsinki Olympic Stadium tower in the background can be seen.
60 Years of Peace			
Designer: Pertti Mäkinen		Mint: Mint of Finland Ltd.	
Value: €10	Alloy: Ag 925 (Silver)	Quantity: 5,000; 55,000	Quality: BU; Proof
Issued: 2005	Diameter: 38.60 mm (1.52 in)	Weight: 27.40 g (0.97 oz; 0.88 ozt)	Market value: €32.50 €32-€59
The obverse of the coin shows a dove carrying a twig in its beak. Below is the chain from which the dove has broken free, as well as the symbol of the Europa Coins Programme. The reverse of the coin is divided into two parts, where the lower part symbolizes the frosted ground and wartime, and the top part symbolizes the bright sky and peace. From the harsh ground, where only thorns have previously grown, a plant blooms as it grows and stretches for the freedom of the surface.
The Unknown Soldier and Finnish Cinematographic Art			
Designer: Reijo Paavilainen		Mint: Mint of Finland Ltd.	
Value: €10	Alloy: Ag 925 (Silver)	Quantity: 25,000; 15,000	Quality: BU; Proof
Issued: 2005	Diameter: 38.6 mm (1.52 in)	Weight: 25.5 g (0.90 oz; 0.82 ozt)	Market value: €38.50 €39.50
The obverse features a battlefield trench carved in the pattern of a soldier's face and helmet in profile. The Finnish phrase tuntematon sotilas (unknown soldier) can be seen in this side of the coin. The reverse has an embossed uniformed soldier standing at attention, shaped as a filmstrip.

== 2006 coinage ==
Finnish EU Presidency 2006			
Designer: Reijo Paavilainen		Mint: Mint of Finland Ltd.	
Value: €5	Alloy: Center: Cu (Copper) & Ni (Nickel); Ring: Al (Aluminium) & Pr (Bronze)	Quantity: 100,000	Quality: BU
Issued: 2006	Diameter: 35.0 mm (1.38 in)	Weight: 18.7 g (0.66 oz; 0.60 ozt)	Market value: €13-€15
Finnish EU Presidency 2006			
Designer: Reijo Paavilainen		Mint: Mint of Finland Ltd.	
Value: €50	Alloy: Center: Au 750 (Gold); Ring: Ag 925 (Silver)	Quantity: 8,000	Quality: Proof
Issued: 2006	Diameter: 27.25 mm (1.07 in)	Weight: 12.8 g (0.45 oz; 0.41 ozt)	Market value: €295
These two coins feature a silver colored center and gold colored ring, made with two different materials giving them their respective values. On the obverse, a negotiation table, symbolized by the rectangular eminence, depicts the Presidency. The vertical text SUOMI – FINLAND and the horizontal year date (2006), together form a stylized gavel can be seen. There are balloons on the sides, filled with compositions of letters. The uniqueness design of this coin is that the pictorial subject of the reverse imitates the theme of the obverse. The entire pattern is made up of letters. Looking carefully you see a human face and balloons as well.
150th Anniversary of Demilitarisation of Åland Islands			
Designer: Pertti Mäkinen		Mint: Mint of Finland Ltd.	
Value: €5	Alloy: Nordic Gold	Quantity: 55,000	Quality: BU
Issued: 2006	Diameter: 35 mm (1.38 in)	Weight: 18.7 g (0.66 oz; 0.60 ozt)	Market value: €13-€15
The obverse depicts a pine tree, very typical in Åland. The reverse design features a boat's stern and rudder, with a dove perched on the tiller, a symbol of 150 years of peace. A characteristic of this coin is that the text "150 years" and "the demilitarisation of Åland" is written on the obverse of the coin in Swedish, and on the edge of the coin in Finnish.
Johan Vilhelm Snellman			
Designer: Tapio Kettunen		Mint: Mint of Finland Ltd.	
Value: €10	Alloy: Ag 925 (Silver)	Quantity: 7,000; 48,000	Quality: BU; Proof
Issued: 2006	Diameter: 38.6 mm (1.52 in)	Weight: 25.5 g (0.90 oz; 0.82 ozt)	Market value: €31-€35 €36-€49
Johan Vilhelm Snellman (12 May 1806 – 4 July 1881) was an influential Finnish philosopher, writer, journalist and statesman, who championed Finnish culture and developed the structures of the modern civic society. Apart from developing the national education system and the Finnish language, Snellman, in his capacity as Senator and head of the fiscal committee, also introduced a monetary reform that granted Finland a currency of its own, the Finnish markka, in 1865. For this achievement, there is a statue of J.V. Snellman in front of the Bank of Finland building in Helsinki. The obverse depicts J.V. Snellman, It also depicts the logo of the Europe Coins Programme. The reverse design features represent the dawn of Finnish culture.
100th Anniversary of the Finnish Parliamentary			
Designer: Pertti Mäkinen		Mint: Mint of Finland Ltd.	
Value: €10	Alloy: Ag 925 (Silver)	Quantity: 10,000; 20,000	Quality: BU; Proof
Issued: 2006	Diameter: 38.6 mm (1.52 in)	Weight: 25.5 g (0.90 oz; 0.82 ozt)	Market value: €28-€35 €36-€49
This issue celebrates the 100th Anniversary of the Finnish parliamentary reform that brought universal and equal suffrage to Finland as the first country in Europe. The obverse shows the silhouette of a woman's and a man's hands, and below the hands ballots being inserted in a ballot-box. The Finnish word eduskuntauudistus (parliamentary reform) can be seen in this side of the coin. On the reverse, two stylized faces in the centre part, one male and the other female, separated by a thin curved line is depicted. They symbolize the equality of genders, as does the fact that the pictorial subjects on both sides are equal in respect to the centre of the coin.

== 2007 coinage ==
90th Anniversary of Finland's Declaration of Independence			
Designer: Reijo Paavilainen		Mint: Mint of Finland Ltd.	
Value: €5	Alloy: Center: Cu (Copper) & Ni (Nickel); Ring: Al (Aluminium) & Pr (Bronze)	Quantity: 130,000; 20,000	Quality: BU; Proof
Issued: 2007	Diameter: 35 mm (1.38 in)	Weight: 19.81 g (0.70 oz; 0.64 ozt)	Market value: €14.50-€16 €23.50
On 15 November 1917, the Bolsheviks in Russia declared a general right of self-determination, including the right of complete secession, "for the People of Russia". On the same day the Finnish Parliament issued the Finland's Declaration of Independence, a declaration by which it assumed all powers of sovereignty in Finland. On 6 December 1917, the Parliament adopted the Declaration, which is why this day is the national holiday Finland Independence Day. The independence of Finland was recognized by the Soviet government on 18 December and approved on 22 December of the same year. This issue celebrates the 90th anniversary of independence in Finland. The reverse shows petroglyph aesthetics, while the obverse has a nine-oar boat with rowers as a symbol of a true Finnish trait: collaboration. You can also distinguish signs of music and Finnish kantele strings in the coin's design.
90th Anniversary of Finland's Declaration of Independence			
Designer: Reijo Paavilainen		Mint: Mint of Finland Ltd.	
Value: €100	Alloy: Au 900 (Gold)	Quantity: 9,000	Quality: Proof
Issued: 2007	Diameter: 22 mm (0.87 in)	Weight: 8.48 g (0.30 oz; 0.27 ozt)	Market value: €304-€377
This issue also celebrates the 90th anniversary of independence in Finland. The 100 euro coin is festive in its expression and its obverse illustrates Finland and the years of independence. The purely abstract composition on the reverse is very rare in Finnish collector coins.
Adolf Erik Nordenskiöld and Northeast Passage			
Designer: Reijo Paavilainen		Mint: Mint of Finland Ltd.	
Value: €10	Alloy: Ag 925 (Silver)	Quantity: <bu> 7,000; 33,000	Quality: BU; Proof
Issued: 2007	Diameter: 38.6 mm (1.52 in)	Weight: 25.5 g (0.90 oz; 0.82 ozt)	Market value: €30-€35 €35-€49
This issue celebrates the 175th anniversary of the birth of Finnish explorer Adolf Erik Nordenskiöld, and of his discovery of the Northeast Passage. The issue is a part of the European series with the Eurostar mintmark, which celebrates European Achievements in 2007. The obverse features an abstract portrait of Nordenskiöld at the helm of his ship. The reverse is dominated by a pattern resembling the labyrinth formed by adjacent ice floats.
Mikael Agricola and Finnish language			
Designer: Reijo Paavilainen		Mint: Mint of Finland Ltd.	
Value: €10	Alloy: Ag 925 (Silver)	Quantity: 6,000; 24,000	Quality: BU; Proof
Issued: 2007	Diameter: 38.6 mm (1.52 in)	Weight: 25.5 g (0.90 oz; 0.82 ozt)	Market value: €30-€37 €35-€49
This collector coin is issued to honor Mikael Agricola's lifework as a contributor of protestant reformation in Finland and father of Finnish written language. The reverse of the coin shows a quill referencing the writer; while the obverse contains an artistic interpretation of a human figure.

== 2008 coinage ==
90th Anniversary of the Finnish Flag			
Designer: Tapio Kettunen		Mint: Mint of Finland Ltd.	
Value: €10	Alloy: Ag 925 (Silver)	Quantity: 9,000; 26,000	Quality: BU; Proof
Issued: 2008	Diameter: 38.6 mm (1.52 in)	Weight: 25.5 g (0.90 oz; 0.82 ozt)	Market value: €37 €40
This coin is part of the "Europa series 2008". The first Flag of Finland, independent since late 1917, was a red and yellow lion flag. Just six months after the declaration of independence, on 27 May 1918, a proposal on a blue and white cross flag was adopted. The Flag Act was passed two days later. In 2008, the Finnish Blue Cross flag celebrates its 90th anniversary. This is the first ever Finnish collector coin with added colour on it. The obverse shows the dignified Finnish flag with the blue cross in full color in the midst of other flags. The reverse depicts Finnish nature as a cross design that nicely completes the entity. On this side, the Finnish words Suomen lippu and Swedish words Finlands flagga (Finnish flag) can be seen.
Science and Research			
Designer: Tapio Kettunen		Mint: Mint of Finland Ltd.	
Value: €5	Alloy: Disk: Cu (Copper) & Ni (Nickel); Ring: Al (Aluminium) & Pr (Bronze)	Quantity: 25,000; 20,000	Quality: BU; Proof
Issued: 2008	Diameter: 35 mm (1.38 in)	Weight: 19.81 g (0.70 oz; 0.64 ozt)	Market value: €13-€14 €19-€23
In 2008, the Finnish Academy of Science and Letters as well as Helsinki University of Technology celebrate their 100th anniversary. In honour of this event a bimetallic collector coin was minted. The Collector Coin Committee set by the Finnish Ministry of Finance arranged a public competition for the designing of the coin. Designer Tapio Kettunen's proposal "Läpimurto – vihdoinkin uutta valoa" ("Breakthrough – new light at last") emerged as the winner. The Finnish words 100 vuotta tiede ja tutkimus (100 years of science and research) can be observed in the reverse of the coin.
Mika Waltari			
Designer: Reijo Paavilainen		Mint: Mint of Finland Ltd.	
Value: €10	Alloy: Ag 925 (Silver)	Quantity: 5,000; 15,000	Quality: BU; Proof
Issued: 2008	Diameter: 38.6 mm (1.52 in)	Weight: 25.5 g (0.90 oz; 0.82 ozt)	Market value: €39-€54 €34.50
This coin was issued to commemorate the 100th anniversary of the birth of the important Finnish author Mika Waltari (1908–1979). Mika Waltari captivated Finnish readers as early as the 1920s; by the end of the 1940s, a worldwide readership confirmed his popularity. His best-known and most loved book was The Egyptian, published in 1945. The events in the book take place in Egypt during the reigns of the pharaohs Akhenaten and Tutankhamun. Soon after publication, the book became a best-seller in the US, and historians praised Mika Waltari for his detailed scientific knowledge of Egyptology. The reverse depicts a vigilant Pharaoh watchdog referencing his famous book. The obverse is decorated with Waltari's signature and a stylized pen nib that symbolizes the diversity of the writer's production.
200th Anniversary of Finnish War			
Designer: Reijo Paavilainen		Mint: Mint of Finland Ltd.	
Value: €100	Alloy: Au 917 (Gold)	Quantity: 9,000	Quality: Proof
Issued: 2008	Diameter: 22 mm (0.87 in)	Weight: 8.48 g (0.30 oz; 0.27 ozt)	Market value: €425
This issue commemorates the 200th anniversary of the Finnish War and the Birth of Finnish Autonomy. The Finnish War was fought between Sweden and Russia from February 1808 to September 1809, with Finnish guerrilla troops helping on the Swedish side. As a result of the Russian-won war, the eastern third of Sweden was established as the autonomous Grand Duchy of Finland within the Russian Empire. Other notable effects were the Swedish parliament's adoption of a new constitution (also called Swedish Act of Succession) and the establishment of the House of Bernadotte, the new Swedish royal house, in 1818. The motif on the coin is the passage from Sweden to Russia. The same coin depicts both Finnish history, with the withdrawing crown on the reverse side as well as the future of the country, with the eagle symbol on the obverse side.

== 2009 coinage ==
Fredrik Pacius			
Designer: Pertti Mäkinen		Mint: Mint of Finland Ltd.	
Value: €10	Alloy: Ag 925 (Silver)	Quantity: 7,000; 28,000	Quality: BU; Proof
Issued: 2009	Diameter: 38.6 mm (1.52 in)	Weight: 25.5 g (0.90 oz; 0.82 ozt)	Market value: N/A
Friedrich Pacius was a German composer and conductor who lived most of his life in Finland. He has been called the "Father of Finnish music". Pacius was appointed music teacher at the University of Helsinki in 1834. There he founded a musical society, a student choir and an orchestra. In 1848 Pacius wrote the music to the poem Vårt land by Johan Ludvig Runeberg, which was to become Finland's national anthem. Pacius's music was also used for the Estonian national anthem Mu isamaa, mu õnn ja rõõm and the Livonian national anthem Min izāmō, min sindimō. He also composed Kung Karls jakt (The Hunt of King Charles) which was the first Finnish opera. This issue celebrates the 200th anniversary of his birth. The obverse and reverse of the coin complement each other, forming stylized musical notations floating in what reflects a view of a stage. This is the fifth Finnish collector coin in the Eurostar series with the pan-European mint mark.
