= Euro gold and silver commemorative coins (Malta) =

Republic of Malta Repubblika ta' Malta
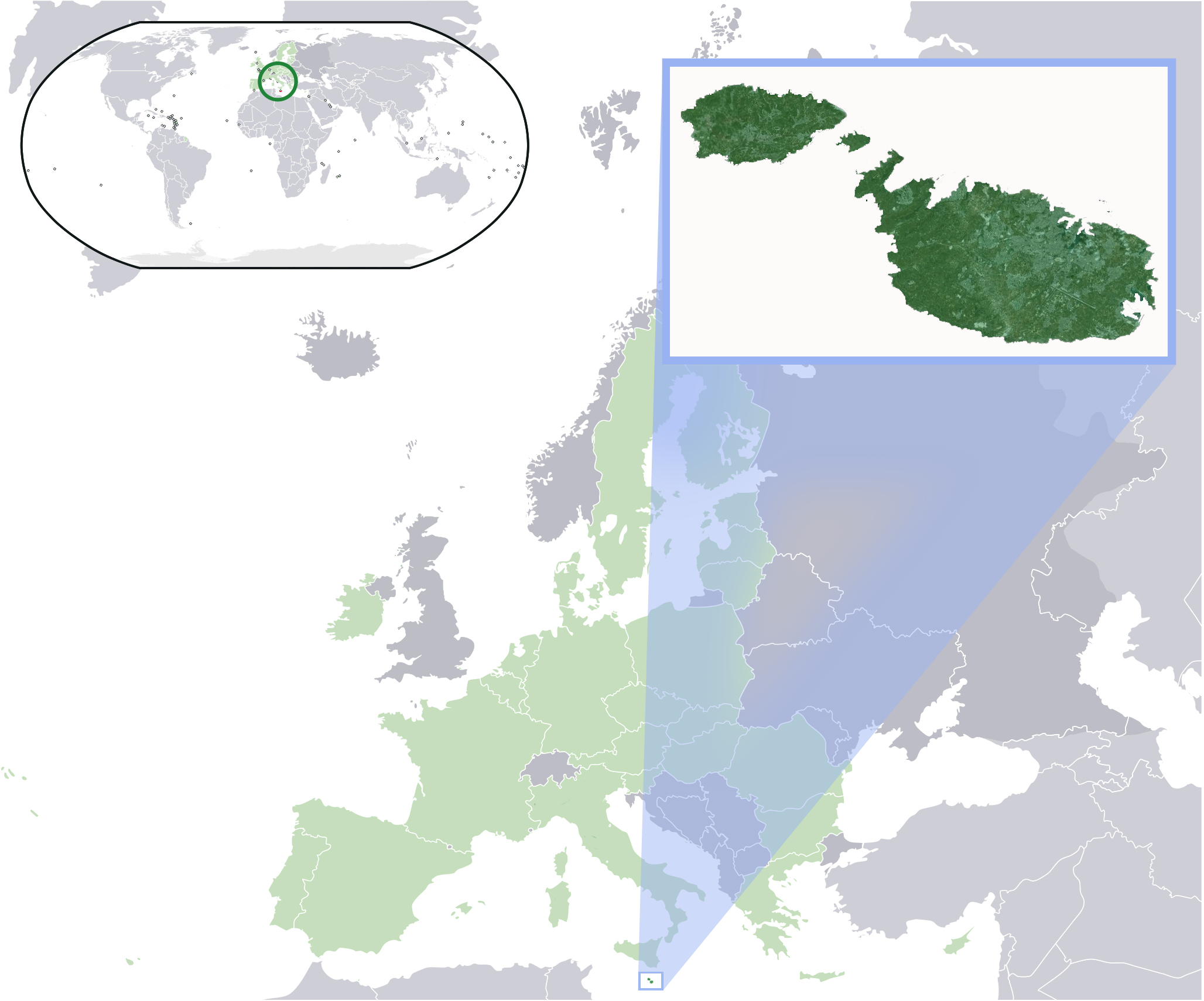
- ISO 3166 code: MT

Euro gold and silver commemorative coins are special euro coins minted and issued by member states of the Eurozone, mainly in gold and silver, although other metals are also used on rare occasions. Malta introduced the euro (€) on 1 January 2008. In a short time, the Central Bank of Malta has been producing both normal issues of Maltese euro coins, which are intended for circulation, and commemorative euro coins in gold and silver.

These special coins have a legal tender only in Malta, unlike the normal issues of the Maltese euro coins, which have a legal tender in every country of the Eurozone. This means that the commemorative coins made of gold and silver cannot be used as money in other countries. Furthermore, as their bullion value (Note: Precious metals in bulk form are known as bullion, and are traded on international regulated markets. Bullion metals may be cast into ingots, or minted into coins. The defining attribute of bullion is that it is valued by its mass and purity rather than by a face value as money.) generally vastly exceeds their face value, these coins are not intended to be used as means of payment at all—although it remains possible. For this reason, they are usually named Collectors' coins.

The coins usually commemorate the anniversaries of historical events or draw attention to current events of special importance to Malta.

== Summary ==
The following table shows the number of coins minted per year. In the first section, the coins are grouped by the metal used, while in the second section they are grouped by their face value.

Year	Issues	By metal			By face value				
Year	Issues	gold	silver	others	€100	€50	€15	€10	€5
2008	2	1	1	–	–	1	–	1	–
2009	2	1	1	–	–	1	–	1	–
2010	2	1	1	–	–	1	–	1	–
2011	2	1	1	–	–	1	–	1	–
2012	2	1	1	–	–	1	–	1	–
2013	7	3	4	–	–	1	1	4	1
2014	9	3	5	1	–	1	1	5	2
2015	8	4	4	–	–	1	1	4	2
2016	5	2	3	–	–	1	–	3	1
2017	5	1	4	–	–	1	–	4	–
2018	6	2	3	1	1	1	–	3	1
2019	4	1	3	–	–	1	–	3	–
2020	3	1	2	–	–	1	–	2	–
Total	57	22	33	2	1	13	3	33	7

== 2008 Coinage ==
Auberge de Castille			
Designer: Royal Dutch Mint		Mint: Royal Dutch Mint	
Face Value: €10	Alloy: Ag 925 (Silver)	Quantity: 18,000	Quality: Proof
Issued: 26 August 2008	Diameter: 38.61 mm (1.52 in)	Weight: 28.28 g (1.00 oz; 0.91 ozt)	Issue price: €38 Market Value: €46–€54
Auberge de Castille			
Designer: Royal Dutch Mint		Mint: Royal Dutch Mint	
Face Value: €50	Alloy: Au 916 (Gold)	Quantity: 3,000	Quality: Proof
Issued: 26 August 2008	Diameter: 21 mm (0.83 in)	Weight: 6.5 g (0.23 oz; 0.21 ozt)	Issue price: €185 Market Value: €290–€390
In August 2008, Malta issued its first commemorative coins denominated in euro, in both silver and gold. These coins make part of the Europa Coin Program. The theme for the year 2008 is Cultural Heritage. Both coins feature the Auberge de Castille. On the reverse the Portico of the Auberge de Castille is shown. The stately doorway to the Auberge of Castille, Leon and Portugal is a symbol of the seat of government in Malta as the Auberge now houses the Prime Minister's office. This is the largest of all auberges at the time of the Knights (1530–1798). The building is situated at the highest point of Valletta and was built in 1574. On the obverse the Coat of Arms of Malta is displayed. Malta's Coat of Arms is a heraldic representation of the National flag of Malta. Above the shield is a mural crown representing the fortifications of Malta and denoting a City-state. Around the shield is a wreath of two branches, of Olive and Palm, symbols of peace and traditionally associated with Malta.

== 2009 Coinage ==
Castellania			
Designer: Royal Dutch Mint		Mint: Royal Dutch Mint	
Face Value: €10	Alloy: Ag 925 (Silver)	Quantity: 15,000	Quality: Proof
Issued: 22 June 2009	Diameter: 38.61 mm (1.52 in)	Weight: 28.28 g (1.00 oz; 0.91 ozt)	Issue price: €38 Market Value:
Castellania			
Designer: Royal Dutch Mint		Mint: Royal Dutch Mint	
Face Value: €50	Alloy: Au 916 (Gold)	Quantity: 3,000	Quality: Proof
Issued: 22 June 2009	Diameter: 21 mm (0.83 in)	Weight: 6.5 g (0.23 oz; 0.21 ozt)	Issue price: €200 Market Value:
Architecturally, the Castellania is one of the most striking buildings in Merchants Street in Valletta. The present building is the result of a reconstruction, started in 1748 by Grand Master Emanuel Pinto, a fact ostentatiously evidenced by the eighteen crescents (sixteen around the doorway and two on the door) symbolically shown on the ornate central element of the façade, the crescent being a heraldic component of that Portuguese Grand Master's coat-of-arms. The Castellania served to house the Civil and Criminal Tribunals of the Order and also provided accommodation for the Castellano. Since 1895, this building has housed the Medical and Public Health Head Office. The obverse of the coins shows the Emblem of Malta with the year of issue 2009. The reverse depicts the Castellania. The 'Europa Star', which is the official logo of the programme, is also shown on the reverse side of the coins.

== 2010 Coinage ==
Auberge d'Italie			
Designer: Royal Dutch Mint		Mint: Royal Dutch Mint	
Face Value: €10	Alloy: Ag 925 (Silver)	Quantity: 12,500	Quality: Proof
Issued: 2010	Diameter: 38.61 mm (1.52 in)	Weight: 28.28 g (1.00 oz; 0.91 ozt)	Issue price: €44 Market Value:
Auberge d'Italie			
Designer: Royal Dutch Mint		Mint: Royal Dutch Mint	
Face Value: €50	Alloy: Au 916 (Gold)	Quantity: 3,000	Quality: Proof
Issued: 2010	Diameter: 21 mm (0.83 in)	Weight: 6.5 g (0.23 oz; 0.21 ozt)	Issue price: €269 Market Value:
Auberge d'Italie was built in the 16th century to house Italian knights of the Order of St. John. It was refurbished and renovated a number of times, and its façade was rebuilt the 1680s, during the magistracy of Gregorio Carafa. After the Order was expelled from Malta in 1798, the auberge was used by the French and British militaries. In the 20th century, it housed a museum, a school, a courthouse, a post office and a number of government offices. Since 2002, it has housed the Ministry of Tourism and the Malta Tourism Authority. The obverse of the coins show the Emblem of Malta with the year of issue 2010. The reverse shows the centrepiece of the auberge's façade, including a bust of Carafa. The 'Europa Star', which is the official logo of the programme, is also shown on the reverse side of the coins.

== 2011 Coinage ==
Phoenician Explorers			
Designer: Royal Dutch Mint		Mint: Royal Dutch Mint	
Face Value: €10	Alloy: Ag 925 (Silver)	Quantity: 10,000	Quality: Proof
Issued: 2011	Diameter: 38.61 mm (1.52 in)	Weight: 28.28 g (1.00 oz; 0.91 ozt)	Issue price: Market Value:
Phoenician Explorers			
Designer: Royal Dutch Mint		Mint: Royal Dutch Mint	
Face Value: €50	Alloy: Au 916 (Gold)	Quantity: 2,000	Quality: Proof
Issued: 2011	Diameter: 21 mm (0.83 in)	Weight: 6.5 g (0.23 oz; 0.21 ozt)	Issue price: Market Value:

== 2012 Coinage ==
Antonio Sciortino			
Designer: Noel Galea Bason		Mint: Royal Dutch Mint	
Face Value: €10	Alloy: Ag 925 (Silver)	Quantity: 10,000	Quality: Proof
Issued: 2012	Diameter: 38.61 mm (1.52 in)	Weight: 28.28 g (1.00 oz; 0.91 ozt)	Issue price: Market Value:
Antonio Sciortino			
Designer: Noel Galea Bason		Mint: Royal Dutch Mint	
Face Value: €50	Alloy: Au 916 (Gold)	Quantity: 2,000	Quality: Proof
Issued: 2012	Diameter: 21 mm (0.83 in)	Weight: 6.5 g (0.23 oz; 0.21 ozt)	Issue price: Market Value:

== 2013 Coinage ==
Dun Karm Psaila			
Designer: Noel Galea Bason		Mint: Royal Dutch Mint	
Face Value: €10	Alloy: Ag 925 (Silver)	Quantity: 10,000	Quality: Proof
Issued: 2013	Diameter: 38.61 mm (1.52 in)	Weight: 28.28 g (1.00 oz; 0.91 ozt)	Issue price: Market Value:
Dun Karm Psaila			
Designer: Noel Galea Bason		Mint: Royal Dutch Mint	
Face Value: €50	Alloy: Au 916 (Gold)	Quantity: 2,000	Quality: Proof
Issued: 2013	Diameter: 21 mm (0.83 in)	Weight: 6.5 g (0.23 oz; 0.21 ozt)	Issue price: Market Value:

Grand Master Emmanuel Pinto			
Designer: Luc Luycx		Mint: Royal Belgian Mint	
Face Value: €10	Alloy: Ag 925 (Silver)	Quantity: 2,000	Quality: Proof
Issued: 2013	Diameter: 38.61 mm (1.52 in)	Weight: 28.28 g (1.00 oz; 0.91 ozt)	Issue price: Market Value:

The Picciolo			
Designer: Royal Dutch Mint		Mint: Royal Dutch Mint	
Face Value: €5	Alloy: Au 585 (Gold)	Quantity: 10,000	Quality: Proof
Issued: 2013	Diameter: 11 mm (0.43 in)	Weight: 0.5 g (0.02 oz; 0.02 ozt)	Issue price: Market Value:

Auberge de Provence			
Designer: Noel Galea Bason		Mint: Royal Belgian Mint	
Face Value: €10	Alloy: Ag 925 (Silver)	Quantity: 5,000	Quality: Proof
Issued: 2013	Diameter: 33 mm (1.30 in)	Weight: 18.75 g (0.66 oz; 0.60 ozt)	Issue price: Market Value:
Auberge de Provence			
Designer: Noel Galea Bason		Mint: Royal Belgian Mint	
Face Value: €50	Alloy: Au 999 (Gold)	Quantity: 2,500	Quality: Proof
Issued: 2013	Diameter: 14 mm (0.55 in)	Weight: 1.25 g (0.04 oz; 0.04 ozt)	Issue price: Market Value:

Sir Paul Boffa			
Designer: Noel Galea Bason		Mint: Royal Dutch Mint	
Face Value: €10	Alloy: Ag 925 (Silver)	Quantity: 2,500	Quality: Proof
Issued: 2013	Diameter: 38.61 mm (1.52 in)	Weight: 28.28 g (1.00 oz; 0.91 ozt)	Issue price: Market Value:

== 2014 Coinage ==
Maestro Charles Camilleri			
Designer: Noel Galea Bason		Mint: Royal Dutch Mint	
Face Value: €10	Alloy: Ag 925 (Silver)	Quantity: 5,000	Quality: Proof
Issued: 2014	Diameter: 38.61 mm (1.52 in)	Weight: 28.28 g (1.00 oz; 0.91 ozt)	Issue price: Market Value:
Maestro Charles Camilleri			
Designer: Noel Galea Bason		Mint: Royal Dutch Mint	
Face Value: €50	Alloy: Au 916 (Gold)	Quantity: 1,500	Quality: Proof
Issued: 2014	Diameter: 21 mm (0.83 in)	Weight: 6.5 g (0.23 oz; 0.21 ozt)	Issue price: Market Value:

The Zecchino			
Designer: Noel Galea Bason		Mint: Royal Dutch Mint	
Face Value: €5	Alloy: Au 999 (Gold)	Quantity: 10,000	Quality: Proof
Issued: 2014	Diameter: 11 mm (0.43 in)	Weight: 0.5 g (0.02 oz; 0.02 ozt)	Issue price: Market Value:

First World War centenary			
Designer: Noel Galea Bason		Mint: Royal Belgian Mint	
Face Value: €5	Alloy: Brass	Quantity: 200,000	Quality: Circulation
Issued: 2014	Diameter: 30 mm (1.18 in)	Weight: 10.5 g (0.37 oz; 0.34 ozt)	Issue price: Market Value:
First World War centenary			
Designer: Noel Galea Bason		Mint: Royal Belgian Mint	
Face Value: €10	Alloy: Ag 925 (Silver)	Quantity: 5,000	Quality: Proof
Issued: 2014	Diameter: 37 mm (1.46 in)	Weight: 22.85 g (0.81 oz; 0.73 ozt)	Issue price: Market Value:

Auberge d'Aragon			
Designer: Noel Galea Bason		Mint: Royal Belgian Mint	
Face Value: €10	Alloy: Ag 925 (Silver)	Quantity: 2,500	Quality: Proof
Issued: 2014	Diameter: 33 mm (1.30 in)	Weight: 18.75 g (0.66 oz; 0.60 ozt)	Issue price: Market Value:
Auberge d'Aragon			
Designer: Noel Galea Bason		Mint: Royal Belgian Mint	
Face Value: €15	Alloy: Au 999 (Gold)	Quantity: 1,000	Quality: Proof
Issued: 2014	Diameter: 14 mm (0.55 in)	Weight: 1.25 g (0.04 oz; 0.04 ozt)	Issue price: Market Value:

Malta Independence 50th Anniversary			
Designer: Noel Galea Bason		Mint: Royal Dutch Mint	
Face Value: €10	Alloy: Ag 925 (Silver)	Quantity: 5,000	Quality: Proof
Issued: 2014	Diameter: 38.61 mm (1.52 in)	Weight: 28.28 g (1.00 oz; 0.91 ozt)	Issue price: Market Value:

40th Anniversary of the Republic of Malta			
Designer: Noel Galea Bason		Mint: Royal Dutch Mint	
Face Value: €10	Alloy: Ag 925 (Silver)	Quantity: 5,000	Quality: Proof
Issued: 2014	Diameter: 38.61 mm (1.52 in)	Weight: 28.28 g (1.00 oz; 0.91 ozt)	Issue price: Market Value:

== 2015 Coinage ==
400th Anniversary of the Wignacourt Aqueduct			
Designer: Noel Galea Bason		Mint: Royal Belgian Mint	
Face Value: €10	Alloy: Ag 925 (Silver)	Quantity: 2,500	Quality: Proof
Issued: 2015	Diameter: 37 mm (1.46 in)	Weight: 22.85 g (0.81 oz; 0.73 ozt)	Issue price: Market Value:

Bush-Gorbachev Malta Summit			
Designer: Noel Galea Bason		Mint: Royal Dutch Mint	
Face Value: €10	Alloy: Ag 925 (Silver)	Quantity: 5,000	Quality: Proof
Issued: 2015	Diameter: 38.61 mm (1.52 in)	Weight: 28.28 g (1.00 oz; 0.91 ozt)	Issue price: Market Value:
Bush-Gorbachev Malta Summit			
Designer: Noel Galea Bason		Mint: Royal Dutch Mint	
Face Value: €50	Alloy: Au 916 (Gold)	Quantity: 1,500	Quality: Proof
Issued: 2015	Diameter: 21 mm (0.83 in)	Weight: 6.5 g (0.23 oz; 0.21 ozt)	Issue price: Market Value:

Pope John Paul II			
Designer: Noel Galea Bason		Mint: Royal Dutch Mint	
Face Value: €5	Alloy: Au 999 (Gold)	Quantity: 5,000	Quality: Proof
Issued: 2015	Diameter: 11 mm (0.43 in)	Weight: 0.5 g (0.02 oz; 0.02 ozt)	Issue price: Market Value:

Auberge de Bavière			
Designer: Noel Galea Bason		Mint: Royal Belgian Mint	
Face Value: €10	Alloy: Ag 925 (Silver)	Quantity: 2,500	Quality: Proof
Issued: 2015	Diameter: 33 mm (1.30 in)	Weight: 18.75 g (0.66 oz; 0.60 ozt)	Issue price: Market Value:
Auberge de Bavière			
Designer: Noel Galea Bason		Mint: Royal Belgian Mint	
Face Value: €15	Alloy: Au 999 (Gold)	Quantity: 1,000	Quality: Proof
Issued: 2015	Diameter: 14 mm (0.55 in)	Weight: 1.25 g (0.04 oz; 0.04 ozt)	Issue price: Market Value:

450th Anniversary of the Great Siege of Malta			
Designer: Noel Galea Bason		Mint: Royal Dutch Mint	
Face Value: €10	Alloy: Ag 925 (Silver)	Quantity: 5,000	Quality: Proof
Issued: 2015	Diameter: 38.61 mm (1.52 in)	Weight: 28.28 g (1.00 oz; 0.91 ozt)	Issue price: Market Value:

One-third farthing			
Designer: Noel Galea Bason		Mint: Royal Dutch Mint	
Face Value: €5	Alloy: Au 999 (Gold)	Quantity: 2,500	Quality: Proof
Issued: 2015	Diameter: 11 mm (0.43 in)	Weight: 0.5 g (0.02 oz; 0.02 ozt)	Issue price: Market Value:

== 2016 Coinage ==
Antonio Sciortino			
Designer: Noel Galea Bason		Mint: Royal Dutch Mint	
Face Value: €10	Alloy: Ag 925 (Silver)	Quantity: 3,000	Quality: Proof
Issued: 2016	Diameter: 38.61 mm (1.52 in)	Weight: 28.28 g (1.00 oz; 0.91 ozt)	Issue price: Market Value:
Antonio Sciortino			
Designer: Noel Galea Bason		Mint: Royal Dutch Mint	
Face Value: €50	Alloy: Au 916 (Gold)	Quantity: 1,000	Quality: Proof
Issued: 2016	Diameter: 21 mm (0.83 in)	Weight: 6.5 g (0.23 oz; 0.21 ozt)	Issue price: Market Value:

450th anniversary of the foundation of Valletta			
Designer: Noel Galea Bason		Mint: Royal Dutch Mint	
Face Value: €10	Alloy: Ag 925 (Silver)	Quantity: 3,000	Quality: Proof
Issued: 2016	Diameter: 38.61 mm (1.52 in)	Weight: 28.28 g (1.00 oz; 0.91 ozt)	Issue price: Market Value:

100th Anniversary of the birth of Dom Mintoff			
Designer: Noel Galea Bason		Mint: Royal Dutch Mint	
Face Value: €10	Alloy: Ag 925 (Silver)	Quantity: 2,000	Quality: Proof
Issued: 2016	Diameter: 38.61 mm (1.52 in)	Weight: 28.28 g (1.00 oz; 0.91 ozt)	Issue price: Market Value:

Patakka			
Designer: Noel Galea Bason		Mint: Royal Dutch Mint	
Face Value: €5	Alloy: Au 999 (Gold)	Quantity: 2,500	Quality: Proof
Issued: 2016	Diameter: 11 mm (0.43 in)	Weight: 0.5 g (0.02 oz; 0.02 ozt)	Issue price: Market Value:

== 2017 Coinage ==
Malta's Presidency of the Council of the European Union			
Designer: Noel Galea Bason		Mint: Royal Dutch Mint	
Face Value: €10	Alloy: Ag 925 (Silver)	Quantity: 2,500	Quality: Proof
Issued: 2017	Diameter: 38.61 mm (1.52 in)	Weight: 28.28 g (1.00 oz; 0.91 ozt)	Issue price: Market Value:

Argotti Botanical Gardens Conservatory			
Designer: Noel Galea Bason		Mint: Royal Dutch Mint	
Face Value: €10	Alloy: Ag 925 (Silver)	Quantity: 3,000	Quality: Proof
Issued: 2017	Diameter: 38.61 mm (1.52 in)	Weight: 28.28 g (1.00 oz; 0.91 ozt)	Issue price: Market Value:
Argotti Botanical Gardens Conservatory			
Designer: Noel Galea Bason		Mint: Royal Dutch Mint	
Face Value: €50	Alloy: Au 916 (Gold)	Quantity: 1,000	Quality: Proof
Issued: 2017	Diameter: 21 mm (0.83 in)	Weight: 6.5 g (0.23 oz; 0.21 ozt)	Issue price: Market Value:

The Santa Marija Convoy and the George Cross Award			
Designer: Noel Galea Bason		Mint: Royal Dutch Mint	
Face Value: €10	Alloy: Ag 925 (Silver)	Quantity: 2,000	Quality: Proof
Issued: 2017	Diameter: 38.61 mm (1.52 in)	Weight: 28.28 g (1.00 oz; 0.91 ozt)	Issue price: Market Value:

70th Anniversary of Women's Voting Rights			
Designer: Noel Galea Bason		Mint: Royal Dutch Mint	
Face Value: €10	Alloy: Ag 925 (Silver)	Quantity: 1,500	Quality: Proof
Issued: 2017	Diameter: 38.61 mm (1.52 in)	Weight: 28.28 g (1.00 oz; 0.91 ozt)	Issue price: Market Value:

== 2018 Coinage ==
The Baptism of Christ			
Designer: Noel Galea Bason		Mint: Royal Dutch Mint	
Face Value: €10	Alloy: Ag 925 (Silver)	Quantity: 2,500	Quality: Proof
Issued: 2018	Diameter: 38.61 mm (1.52 in)	Weight: 28.28 g (1.00 oz; 0.91 ozt)	Issue price: Market Value:
The Baptism of Christ			
Designer: Noel Galea Bason		Mint: Royal Dutch Mint	
Face Value: €50	Alloy: Au 916 (Gold)	Quantity: 500	Quality: Proof
Issued: 2018	Diameter: 21 mm (0.83 in)	Weight: 6.5 g (0.23 oz; 0.21 ozt)	Issue price: Market Value:

50th Anniversary of the Central Bank of Malta			
Designer: Noel Galea Bason		Mint: Royal Dutch Mint	
Face Value: €10	Alloy: Ag 925 (Silver)	Quantity: 2,500	Quality: Proof
Issued: 2018	Diameter: 38.61 mm (1.52 in)	Weight: 28.28 g (1.00 oz; 0.91 ozt)	Issue price: Market Value:
50th Anniversary of the Central Bank of Malta			
Designer: Noel Galea Bason		Mint: Royal Dutch Mint	
Face Value: €100	Alloy: Au 999 (Gold)	Quantity: 50	Quality: Proof
Issued: 2018	Diameter: 26 mm (1.02 in)	Weight: 15 g (0.53 oz; 0.48 ozt)	Issue price: Market Value:

Ten years of the euro in Malta			
Designer:		Mint: Royal Dutch Mint	
Face Value: €5	Alloy: Cupro-nickel	Quantity: 2,000	Quality: Brilliant Uncirculated
Issued: 2018	Diameter: 33 mm (1.30 in)	Weight: 15.5 g (0.55 oz; 0.50 ozt)	Issue price: Market Value:

Valletta European Capital of Culture 2018			
Designer: Noel Galea Bason		Mint: Royal Dutch Mint	
Face Value: €10	Alloy: Ag 925 (Silver)	Quantity: 2,000	Quality: Proof
Issued: 2018	Diameter: 38.61 mm (1.52 in)	Weight: 28.28 g (1.00 oz; 0.91 ozt)	Issue price: Market Value:

In addition, €25, €50 and €100 gold coins were issued on 30 November 2018. These are Melita bullion coins, not commemorative coins.

== 2019 Coinage ==
Gran Carracca Sant'Anna of the Order of St John			
Designer: Noel Galea Bason		Mint: Royal Dutch Mint	
Face Value: €10	Alloy: Ag 925 (Silver)	Quantity: 2,500	Quality: Proof
Issued: 2019	Diameter: 38.61 mm (1.52 in)	Weight: 28.28 g (1.00 oz; 0.91 ozt)	Issue price: Market Value:
Gran Carracca Sant'Anna of the Order of St John			
Designer: Noel Galea Bason		Mint: Royal Dutch Mint	
Face Value: €50	Alloy: Au 916 (Gold)	Quantity: 400	Quality: Proof
Issued: 2019	Diameter: 21 mm (0.83 in)	Weight: 6.5 g (0.23 oz; 0.21 ozt)	Issue price: Market Value:

The Sette Giugno Riots Centenary			
Designer: Noel Galea Bason		Mint: Royal Dutch Mint	
Face Value: €10	Alloy: Ag 925 (Silver)	Quantity: 1,500	Quality: Proof
Issued: 2019	Diameter: 38.61 mm (1.52 in)	Weight: 28.28 g (1.00 oz; 0.91 ozt)	Issue price: Market Value:

150th Anniversary of the Suez Canal			
Designer: Matyas Houf (reverse); Noel Galea Bason (obverse)		Mint: Royal Dutch Mint	
Face Value: €10	Alloy: Ag 925 (Silver)	Quantity: 2,000	Quality: Proof
Issued: 2019	Diameter: 38.61 mm (1.52 in)	Weight: 28.28 g (1.00 oz; 0.91 ozt)	Issue price: Market Value:

== 2020 Coinage ==
L'Isle Adam Graduals			
Designer: Royal Dutch Mint		Mint: Royal Dutch Mint	
Face Value: €10	Alloy: Ag 925 (Silver)	Quantity: 2,500	Quality: Proof
Issued: 2020	Diameter: 38.61 mm (1.52 in)	Weight: 28.28 g (1.00 oz; 0.91 ozt)	Issue price: Market Value:
L'Isle Adam Graduals			
Designer: Royal Dutch Mint		Mint: Royal Dutch Mint	
Face Value: €50	Alloy: Au 916 (Gold)	Quantity: 400	Quality: Proof
Issued: 2020	Diameter: 21 mm (0.83 in)	Weight: 6.5 g (0.23 oz; 0.21 ozt)	Issue price: Market Value:

75th Anniversary of World War II			
Designer: Noel Galea Bason		Mint: Royal Dutch Mint	
Face Value: €10	Alloy: Ag 925 (Silver)	Quantity: 2,000	Quality: Proof
Issued: 2020	Diameter: 38.61 mm (1.52 in)	Weight: 28.28 g (1.00 oz; 0.91 ozt)	Issue price: Market Value:
