= Coins of Ireland =

Irish coins have been issued by a variety of local and national authorities, the ancient provincial Kings and High Kings of Ireland, the Kingdom of Ireland (1541–1801), the United Kingdom of Great Britain and Ireland (1801–1922), the Irish Free State (1922–1937), and the present Republic of Ireland. Since 2002, the Republic of Ireland has minted Euro coins, featuring symbols such as flax and the harp.

== History ==
=== Hiberno-Norse coins ===
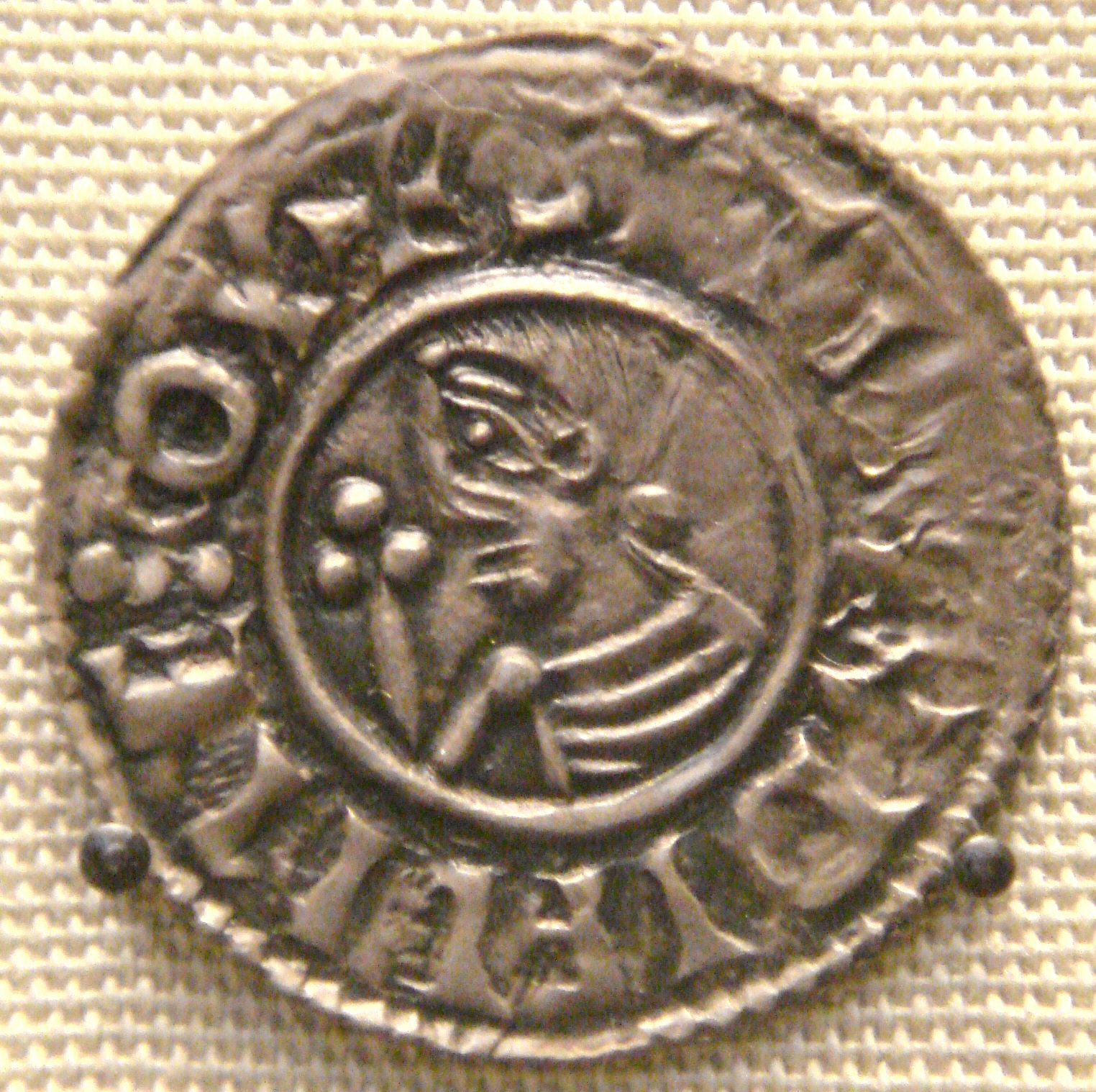
Coin of King "Sihtric" of Dublin (r. 989–1036– )

Hiberno-Norse coins were first produced in Dublin in about 997 under the authority of King Sitric Silkbeard. The first coins were local copies of the issues of Aethelred II of England, and as the Anglo-Saxon coinage of the period changed its design every six years, the coinage of Sitric followed this pattern.

Following the Battle of Clontarf in 1014, the Hiberno-Norse coinage ceased following this pattern and reverted to one of its earlier designs—the so-called 'long cross' type. Coins of this general design (with occasional new designs incorporated briefly from other English and European issues) were struck in decreasing quality over a period of more than 100 years. By the end of the series, the coins had become illegible and debased, and were too thin to serve for practical commerce.

All the coins produced were the penny denomination. They were initially made at the penny standard (i.e. one pennyweight or 1/240th of a pound of silver) but the later pieces are both debased and lightweight.

=== Baronial coins of Ulster ===
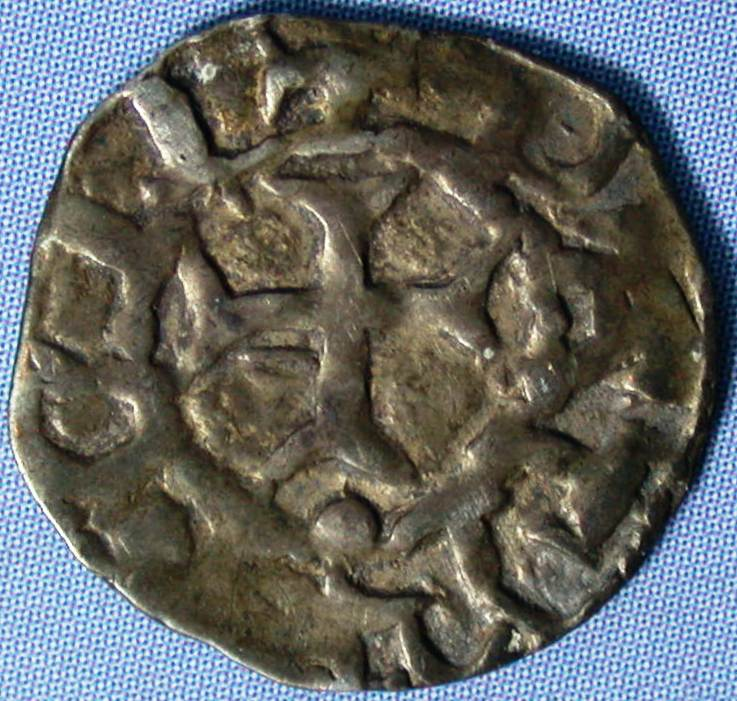
Farthing of John de Courcy, c.1185-c.1205

These coins were issued by Baron John de Courcy, Earl of Ulster.

=== Regal hammered coinage ===
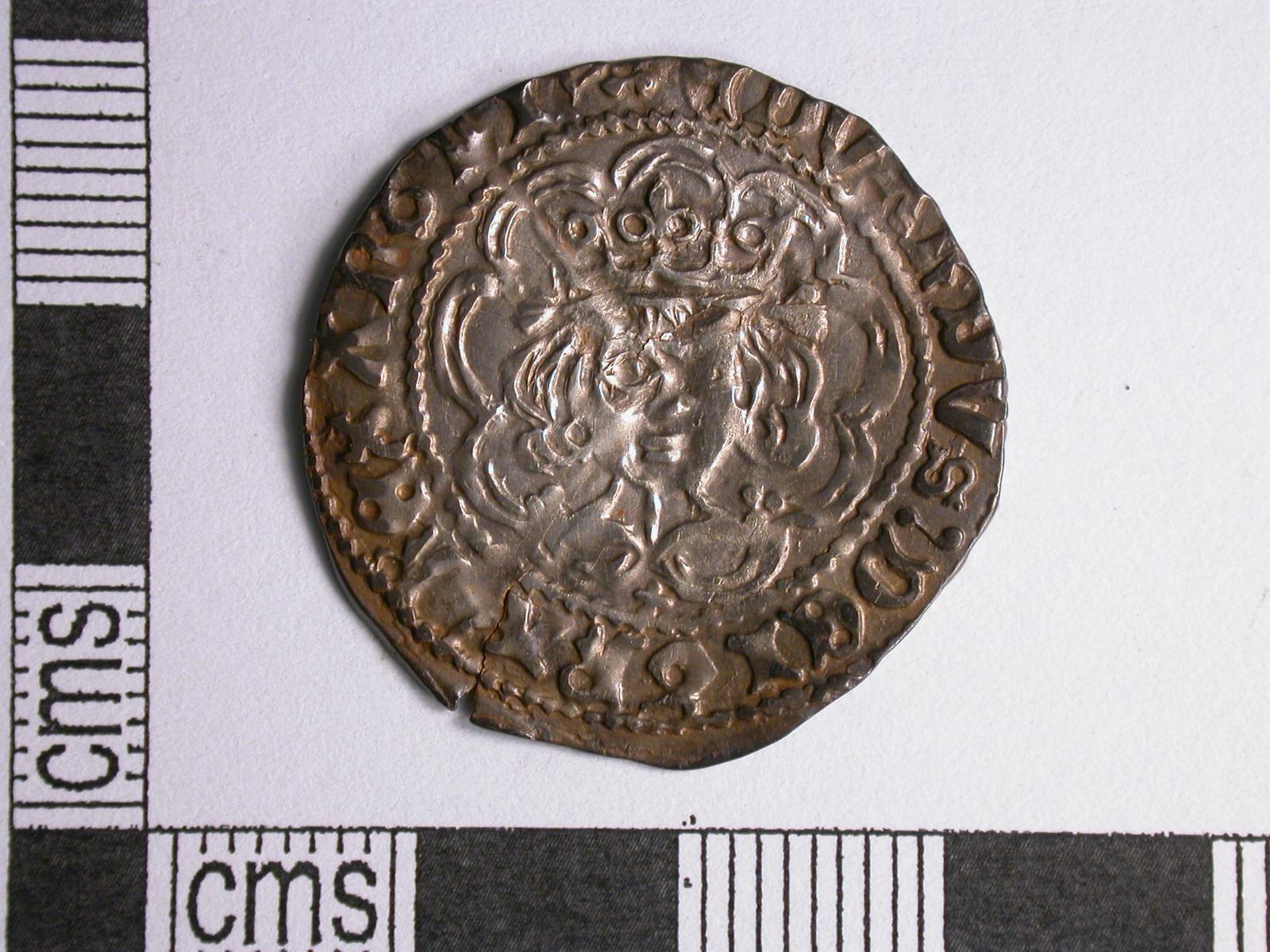
Groat of Edward IV, c. 1470–73

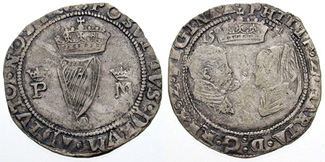
groat depicting King Philip and Queen Mary

The coins that followed the 1169–75 Norman conquest (farthings, halfpennies and pennies) were minted to the same standard as those of England. A chief purpose of these coins was to provide a means for the export of silver from Ireland.

Later pieces followed the standard of England until 1460 when a lower, Irish standard was introduced with coins weighing ¾ of their English counterparts. This coincided with the introduction of a larger denomination, the groat (4 pence). Half groats followed in 1483. Edward VI issued the first Irish shillings following debasement of the coinage during the reign of Henry VIII. Prior to the reign of King Henry VIII (1509–47), the Irish coinage carried the title 'Dominus Hiberniae' (or Lord of Ireland). After 1535, Henry took the title King of Ireland.

In 1561, Elizabeth I introduced a higher standard of silver coinage for a few years before returning to a base standard. Copper halfpennies and pennies were also introduced. Higher standard issues were resumed by James I but all Irish issues ceased in 1607. During the English Civil War, a number of local coins were issued in Ireland.

=== Early milled regal coinage ===
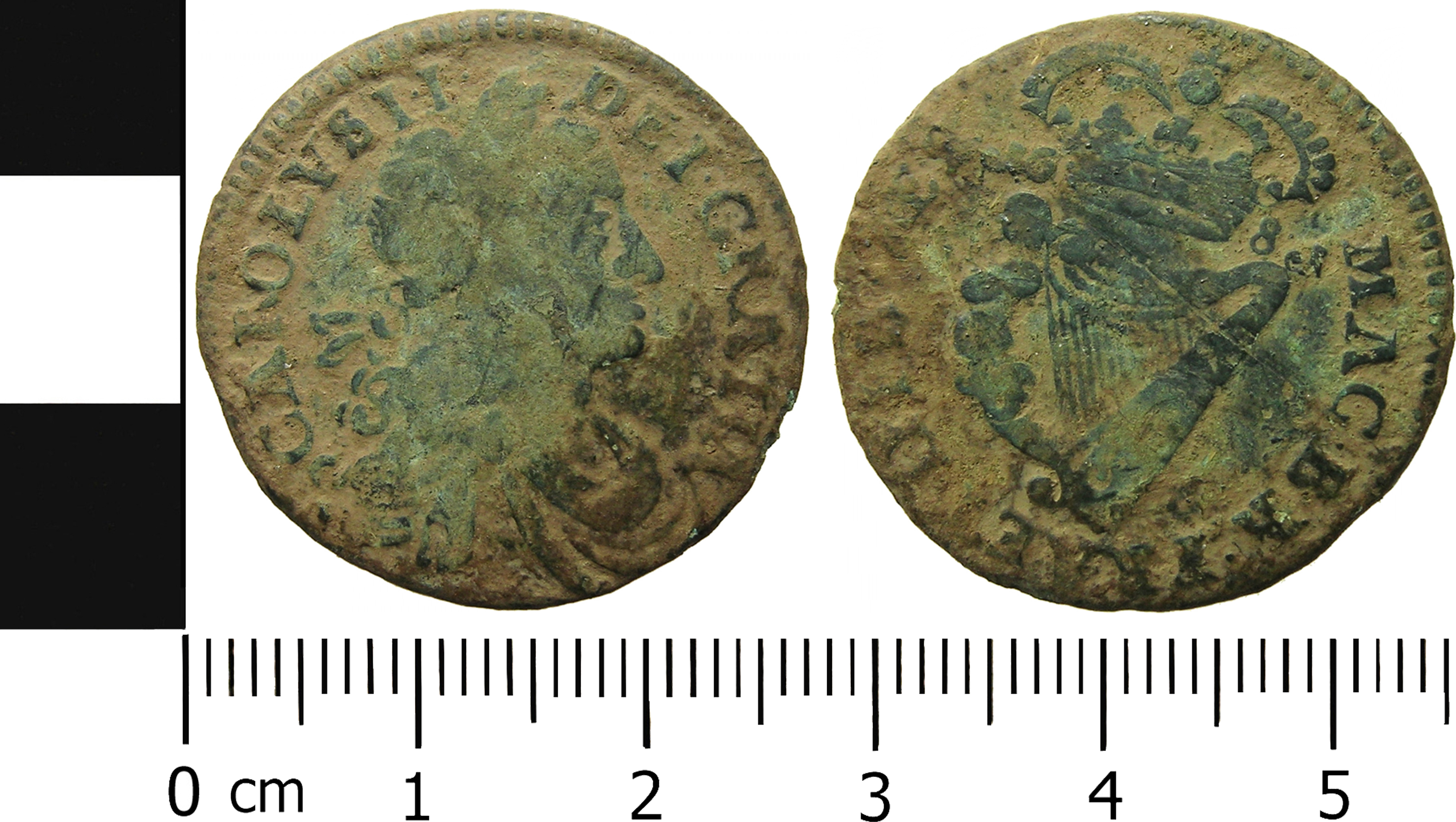
Ha'penny of Charles II, 1681

Copper halfpennies were struck between 1680 and 1689, during the reigns of King Charles II (1660–85) and King James II (1685–88).

=== Civil War coinage of 1689–91 ===
These coins were struck by the deposed King James II after he fled to France. These coins are unique because they show the month of issue as well as the year. As there was a shortage of metal for coinage, church bells and possibly old cannon were melted down, thus giving rise to the name Gun money or Gunmoney. These coins were declared illegal tender after King William III's victory at the Battle of the Boyne in July 1690.

A second issue of emergency coinage, consisting of farthings and halfpennies, was issued in 1691 for use in Limerick.

=== Wood's Halfpence ===
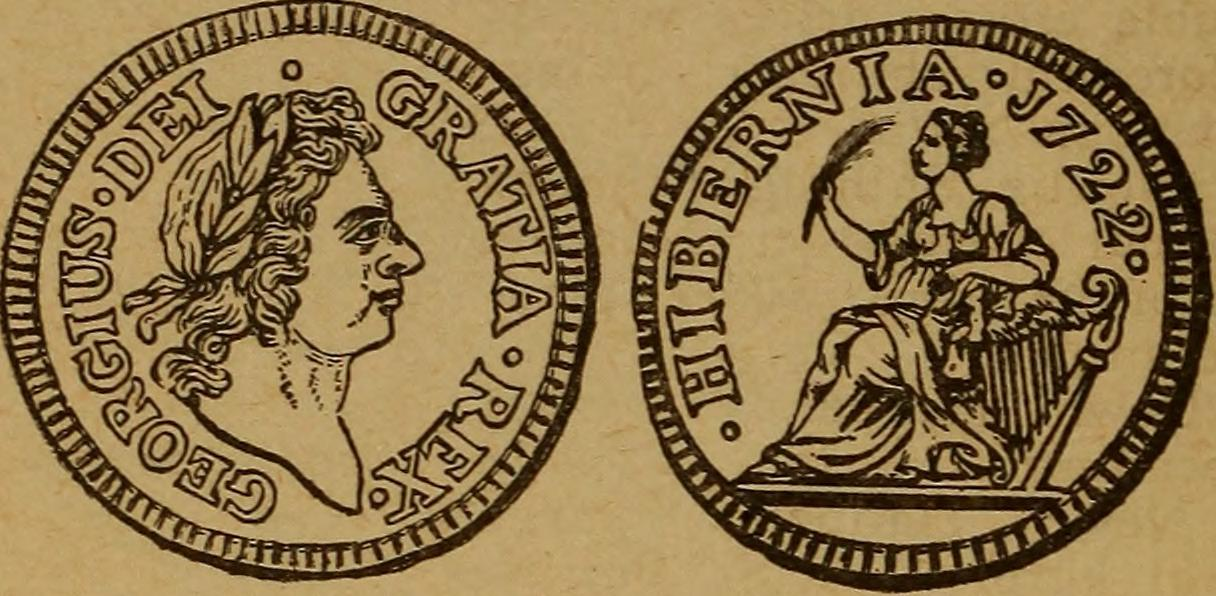
Wood's halfpence coin, obverse and reverse

William Wood was authorised in 1722 to produce up to 360 tons of halfpence and farthings for Ireland at 30 pence to the pound over fourteen years for an annual fee of £800 paid to the king. These coins were unpopular in Ireland, largely due to Jonathan Swift's polemical Drapier's Letters, and Wood lost his patent though compensated with a pension.

=== Later Crown coinage ===
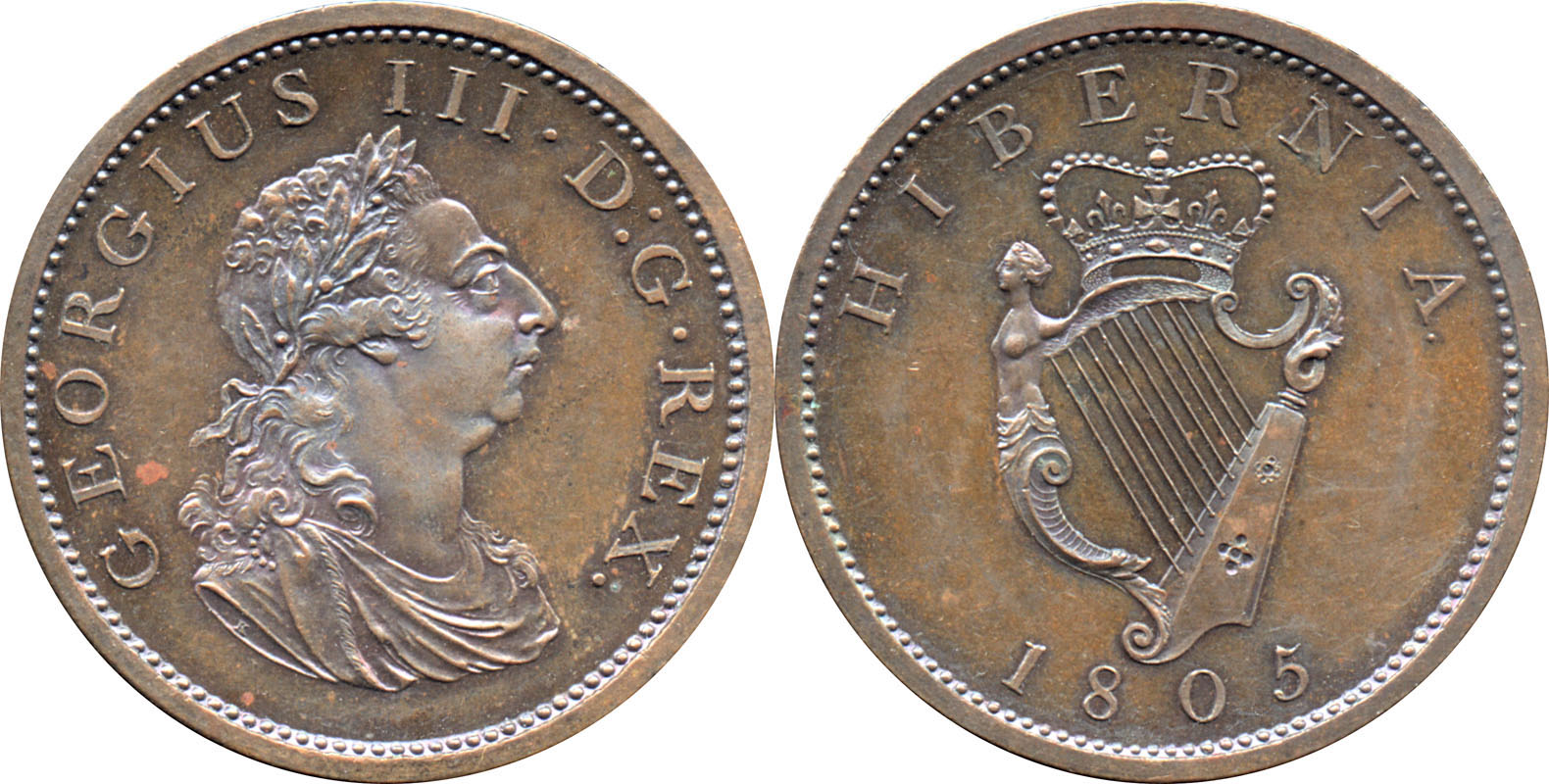
George III penny of 1805 with harp

After the end of the English Civil War, copper farthings and halfpennies resumed production, and pennies were added in 1805. In 1804, the Bank of Ireland introduced silver tokens for 6 shillings which were overstrikes on Spanish dollars. These were followed by 5, 10 and 30 pence Irish tokens. The last halfpennies and pennies were minted in 1823.

The 1822–23 issue marked the last appearance of the symbol of a crowned harp, which represented the Kingdom of Ireland. Following this, standard British coinage was used throughout the island.

=== Coins of the Irish State after 1921 ===
Following the Anglo-Irish Treaty of 1921, the Irish Free State first circulated new national coinage in 1928, marked Saorstát Éireann (Irish Free State), although British coinage was still acceptable in the Free State at an equal rate. In 1937, following the adoption of the Constitution of Ireland which changed the name of the independent Irish State, the coins became marked Éire, although the Irish pound remained pegged at par to sterling.

Ireland and the United Kingdom decimalised their currencies in 1971, and parity between the two currencies continued until Ireland joined the European Exchange Rate Mechanism in 1979. An exchange rate between the Irish punt and the pound sterling was established on 30 March 1979. The smaller denomination British 1p and 2p coins continued to be unofficially interchangeable with the Irish coins until the euro was introduced in 2002, partly due to their identical size and shape. Ireland adopted the euro as its currency along with most of its EU partners on 1 January 2002. The national side of the Irish euro coins bears the coat of arms of Ireland and the 12 stars of the EU, the year of imprint and the Irish name for Ireland, Éire, in the traditional Irish script. These coins circulate throughout the eurozone.

=== Coins of Northern Ireland ===
Northern Ireland has continued to use British coinage since the partition of Ireland. The British one pound coin has featured varying designs to represent England, Scotland, Wales, Northern Ireland, and the UK as a whole. Issues with figures representing Northern Ireland include those of: 1986 and 1991 with a flax plant in a coronet; 1996 and 2001 with a Celtic cross and the torc from the Broighter Hoard; 2006 with MacNeill's Egyptian Arch; 2010 with the coat of arms of Belfast; and 2014 with a shamrock and flax plant. A 2002 two-pound coin featured the flag of Northern Ireland to mark the 2002 Commonwealth Games.

These coins are not unique to Northern Ireland and circulate through the entire United Kingdom and other sterling area countries.

The Giant's Causeway appeared on two five-pound coins in 2012; these are commemorative coins and are rarely circulated. A commemorative 50p coin from 2022 marked Northern Irish writer C. S. Lewis' book The Lion, the Witch and the Wardrobe.

== See also ==
- Commemorative coins of Ireland
