= Auberge de Castille et Portugal =

- Berġa ta' Kastilja u Portugall
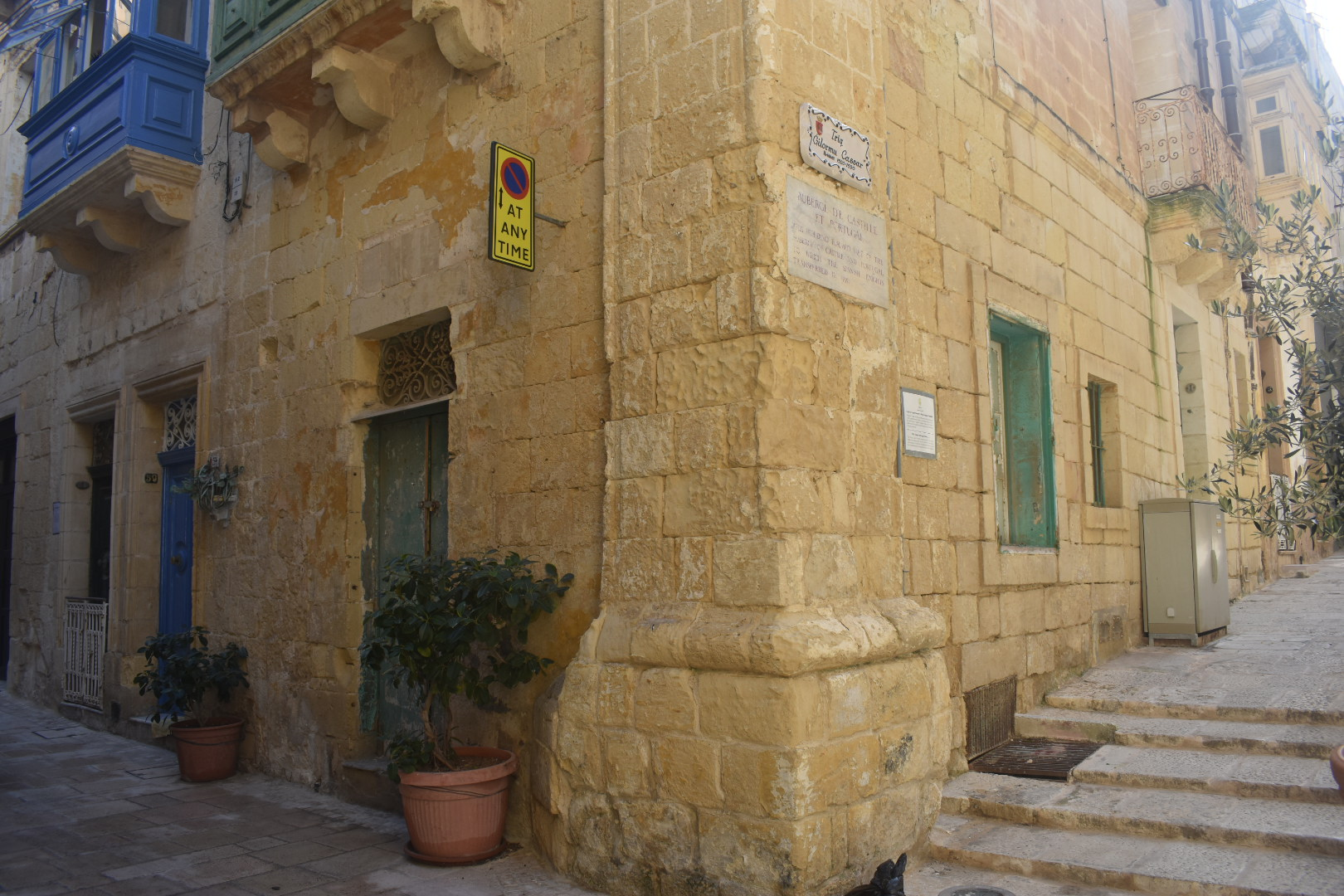
- Remains of the Auberge de Castille et Portugal
- Interactive map of the Auberge de Castille et Portugal area

General information
- Status: Intact but altered
- Type: Auberge
- Architectural style: Melitan
- Location: Birgu, Malta, No. 57–59, Hilda Tabone Street
- Coordinates: 35°53′17″N 14°31′21″E
- Completed: c. 1550s
- Owner: Private

Technical details
- Material: Limestone

Design and construction
- Architect: Niccolò Bellavante

The Auberge de Castille et Portugal (Maltese: Berġa ta' Kastilja u Portugall) was an auberge in Birgu, Malta. It was built to house knights of the Order of Saint John from the langue of Castille, León and Portugal.

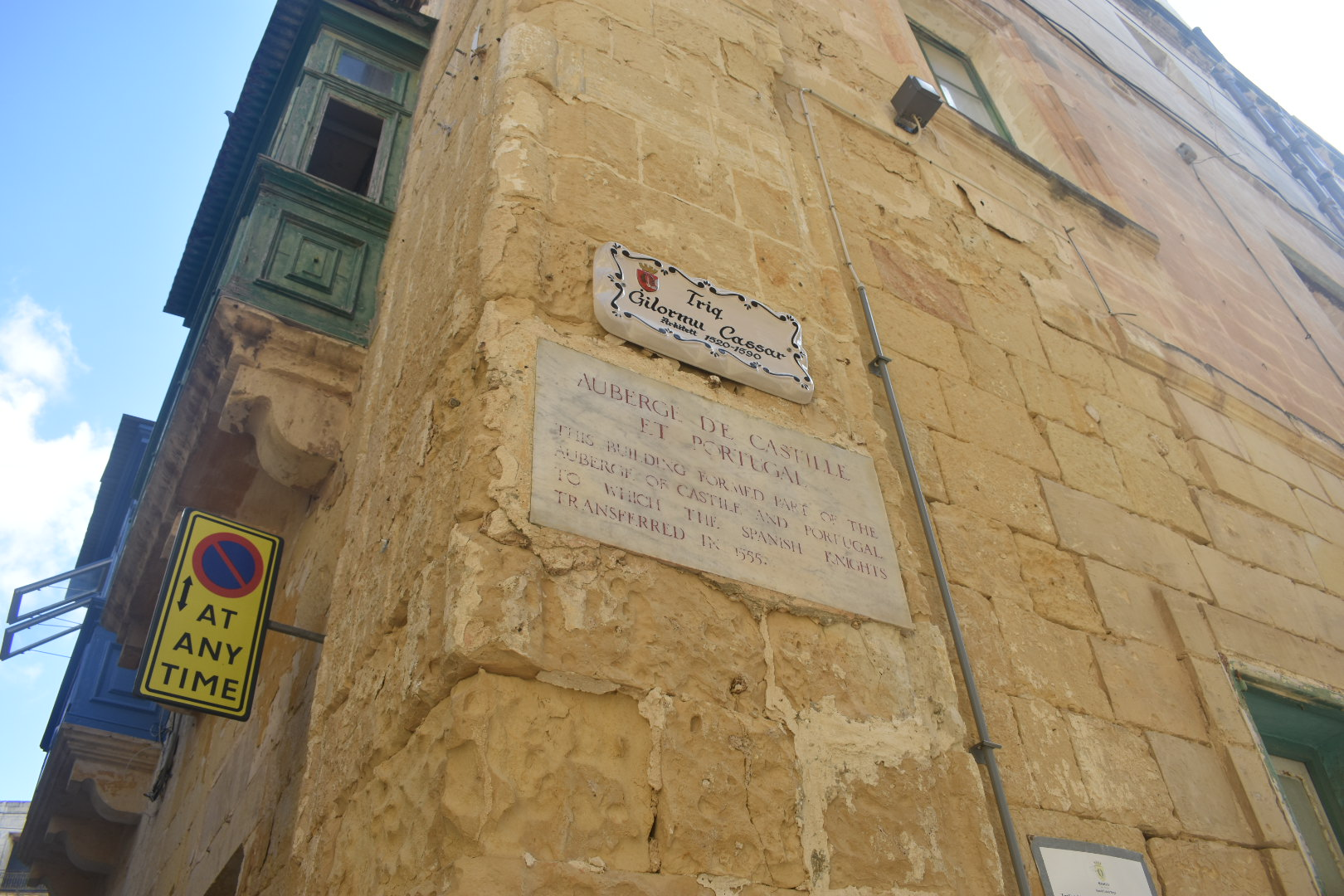
A plaque on the building gives details about the Auberge

The first Auberge de Castille, which was known as the vecchia alberghia di Castiglia, was built in the 1530s. Its exact location is not known and no remains have survived of this first auberge. A second auberge was built in Barrack Front Street (now Hilda Tabone Street) during the magistracy of Grand Master Claude de la Sengle. This auberge was designed by the architect Niccolò Bellavante in the traditional Maltese style, and it housed the langue until the building of a new Auberge de Castille in Valletta in 1574. The building still exists, but it has been heavily altered over time, and only a quoin and some windows with Melitan mouldings remain of the original auberge. The building is privately owned.

The building was included on the Antiquities List of 1925, together with the other auberges in Birgu. It was scheduled as a Grade 1 national monument on 22 December 2009, and it is also listed on the National Inventory of the Cultural Property of the Maltese Islands.
