= Ireland 2007 commemorative 2 euro coin =

Ireland issued a 2 euro commemorative coin in 2007.

== Obverse design ==
A book on a generic design with 12 stars in the outer ring.

== Reverse design ==
A map of Europe with the denomination superimposed with lines and 12 stars.

== Obverse inscription ==
'CONRADH NA RÓIMHE 50 BLIAIN' - Treaty of Rome 50 Years.

'AN EORAIP' - Europe.

'ÉIRE 2007' - Ireland 2007.

== Metallic composition ==
Bimetallic - Nordic gold centre and cupro-nickel outer ring.

== Edge ==
Milled edge with an alternating pattern of '2's and stars incuse.

== Alignment ==
Medallic alignment.

== Type of coin ==
Currency coin and commemorative coin.

== Mint ==
Irish Mint, Dublin, Ireland.

== Catalogue number ==
Not yet listed in the Standard Catalog of World Coins.

== Remarks ==
The obverse inscription is in the Irish-Gaelic language.

This coin was issued by the Republic of Ireland during the term of Mary McAleese, President of Ireland (1997 - 2011).

== See also ==
- Commemorative coins of Ireland
