= Europa Coins 2008 =

The theme for 2008 was European Cultural Heritage.

== Malta ==
Topic: The Auberge de Castille		Designer: unknown	
Face Value: €10	Alloy: Silver 0.925	Quantity: 18,000	Quality: Proof
Issued: 26.08.2008	Diameter: 38.61 mm	Weight: 28.28 g	Issue price: €38
Topic: The Auberge de Castille		Designer: unknown	
Face Value: €50	Alloy: Gold 0.916	Quantity: 3,000	Quality: Proof
Issued: 26.08.2008	Diameter: 21.00 mm	Weight: 6.5 g	Issue price: €185
In August 2008, Malta issued its first commemorative coins denominated in euros, in both silver and gold. These coins make part of the Europa Coin Program. The theme for this year is Cultural Heritage. Both coins feature the Auberge de Castille. The obverse shows the Auberge de Castille's main door – the prime minister's office while the reverse shows the emblem of Malta.
