= Auberge de Castille =

- Berġa ta' Kastilja
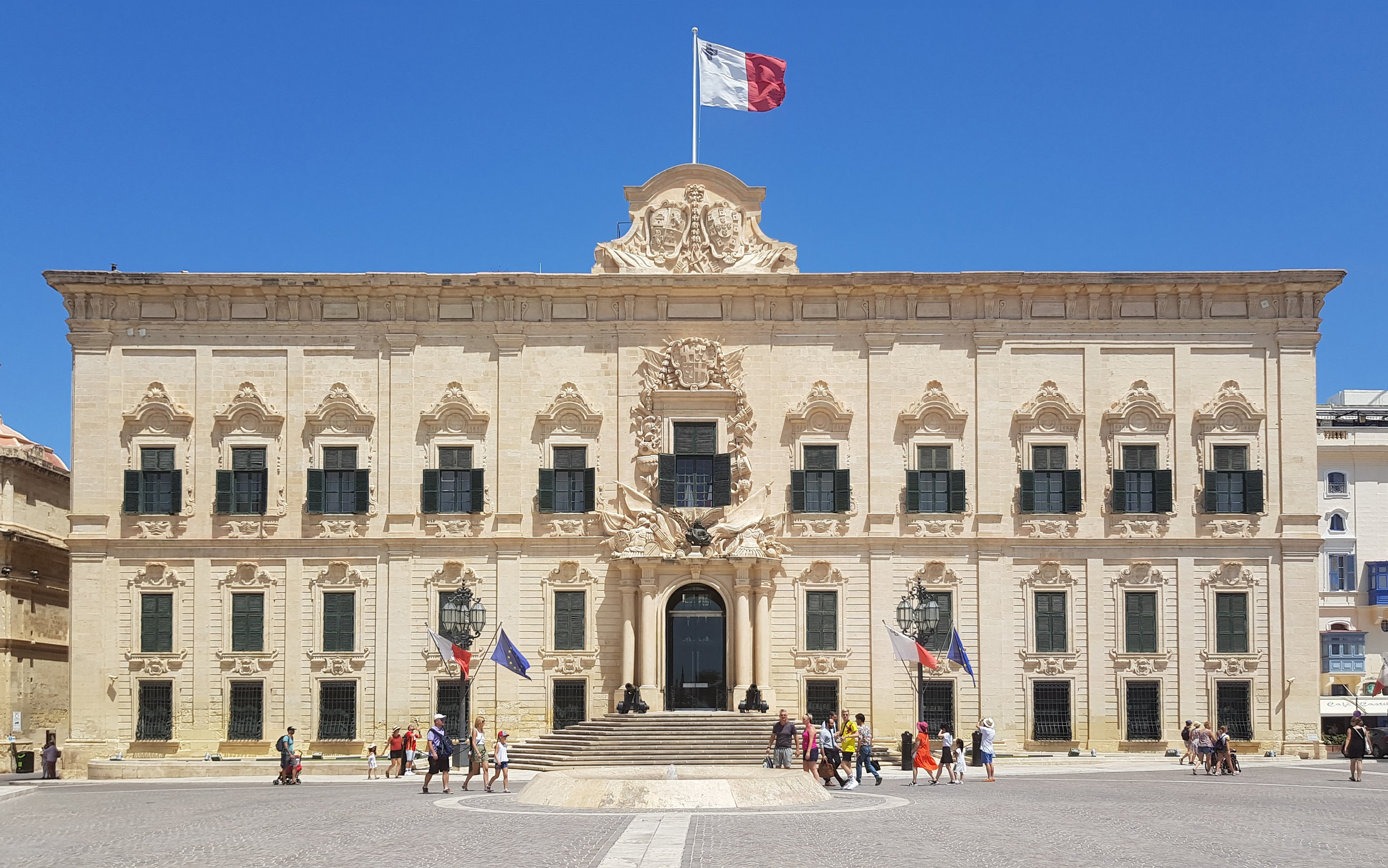
- Façade of Auberge de Castille in 2019
- Interactive map of the Auberge de Castille area

General information
- Status: Intact
- Type: Auberge
- Architectural style: Spanish Baroque
- Location: Valletta, Malta
- Coordinates: 35°53′45″N 14°30′41″E
- Current tenants: Office of the Prime Minister of Malta
- Completed: 1741–1744
- Renovated: 1791
- Owner: Government of Malta

Technical details
- Material: Limestone
- Floor count: 2

Design and construction
- Architect: Andrea Belli

The Auberge de Castille (Maltese: Berġa ta' Kastilja), historically in full known as the Auberge de Castille et Portugal, is an auberge in Valletta, Malta. The auberge is located at Castile Place, close to Saint James Cavalier, the Malta Stock Exchange, and the Upper Barrakka Gardens. It sits at the highest point of Valletta and overlooks Floriana and the Grand Harbour area.

Built in the Baroque style under the magistracy of Portuguese Grand Master Manuel Pinto da Fonseca in the 1740s, it replaced a 1574 building erected to house knights of the Order of Saint John from the langue of Castile, León and Portugal.

== History ==
=== Hospitaller rule ===
Auberge de Castille was built in 1573–74 to designs of the architect Girolamo Cassar. The original auberge, which took over the role of an earlier Auberge de Castille et Portugal in the former capital Birgu, was built in the Mannerist style, and it was regarded as Cassar's most innovative design. The auberge had a single storey, and its façade had panelled pilasters dividing it into 11 bays. The design of the auberge is known from a late 17th-century painting and an early 18th-century drawing.

The original Auberge de Castille was dismantled and completely rebuilt in the Spanish Baroque style between 1741 and 1744, during the magistracy of Grand Master Manuel Pinto da Fonseca. The new building was built to designs of Andrea Belli, and construction was supervised by capomastro Domenico Cachia. Some alterations, including the enlargement of the main door, were made in 1791.

=== French occupation and British rule ===
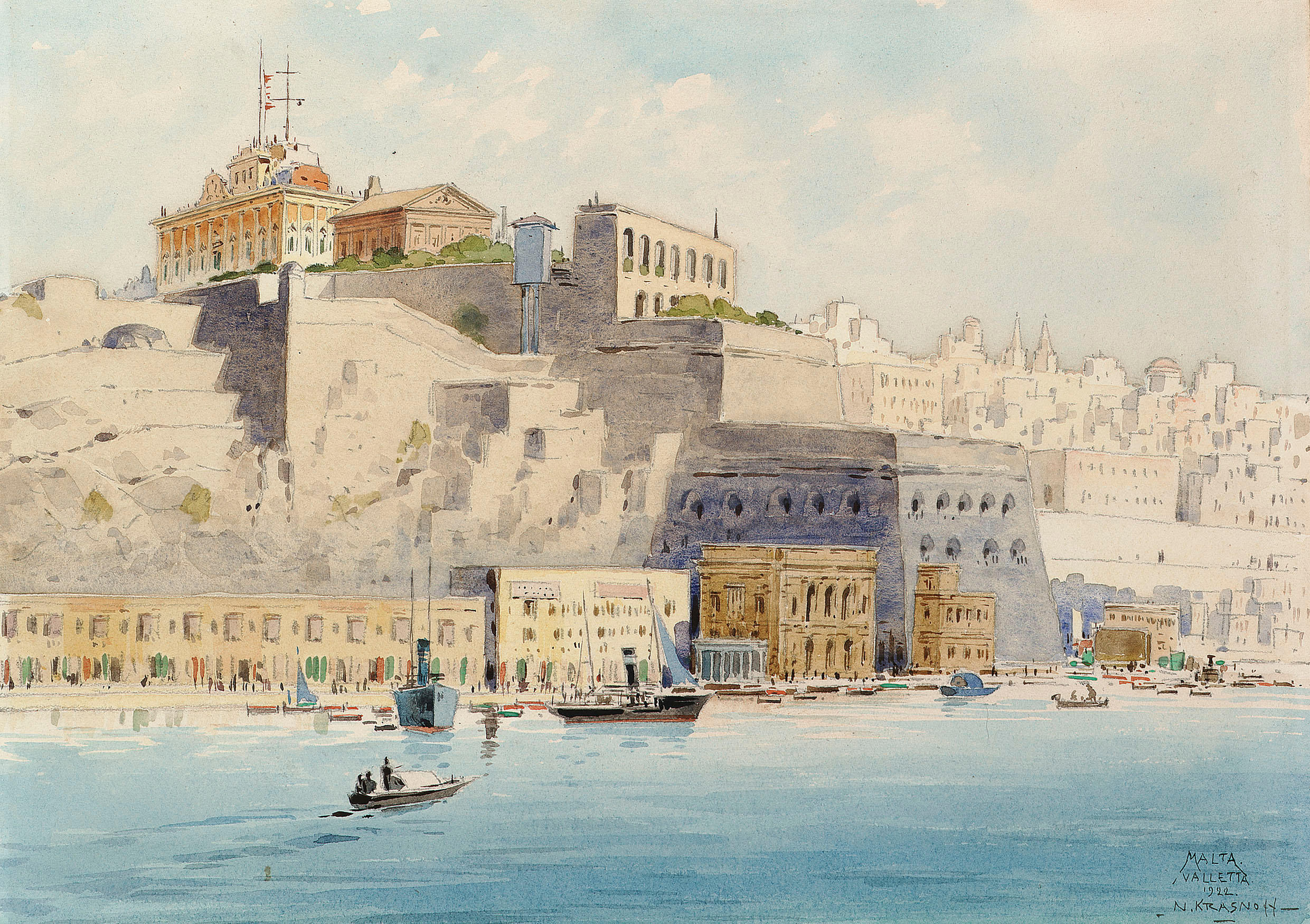
View of the Grand Harbour with the signalling station on Auberge de Castille visible to the left, as depicted in a 1922 painting by Nikolay Krasnov

The Order of St. John was expelled from Malta with the French invasion and occupation in 1798. The auberge subsequently became a headquarters for the French forces, and later housed a Commission for National Property. The building suffered some damage during the blockade of 1798–1800.

In 1800, the British occupied Malta, creating the Malta Protectorate in September of that year. This protectorate was officially ruled by the Kingdom of Sicily, but was in reality part of the British Empire. In 1805, the auberge became the headquarters of the British Armed Forces in Malta. In 1813, Malta officially came under British rule as the Crown Colony of Malta within the British Empire. The auberge was then also used as a residence for British officers. In 1814, a group of crippled soldiers from the army of Egypt was accommodated in the auberge. A Protestant chapel was opened on the first floor in 1840. A signalling station with a large aerial was installed on the roof in 1889 to liaise with warships of the Mediterranean Fleet moored in the Grand Harbour. It was known as the Castille Tower.

The then-Princess Elizabeth, later Queen Elizabeth II, worked with the Soldiers, Sailors, Airmen Families Association (SSAFA) when it was housed at Auberge de Castile.

In 1942, during the Second World War, the right side of the building was damaged by aerial bombardment. The damaged parts were later repaired, and the aerial removed. The auberge was also used as the General Headquarters of the Army for Malta and Libya, and also for Cyprus after 1954.

=== Independent Malta ===
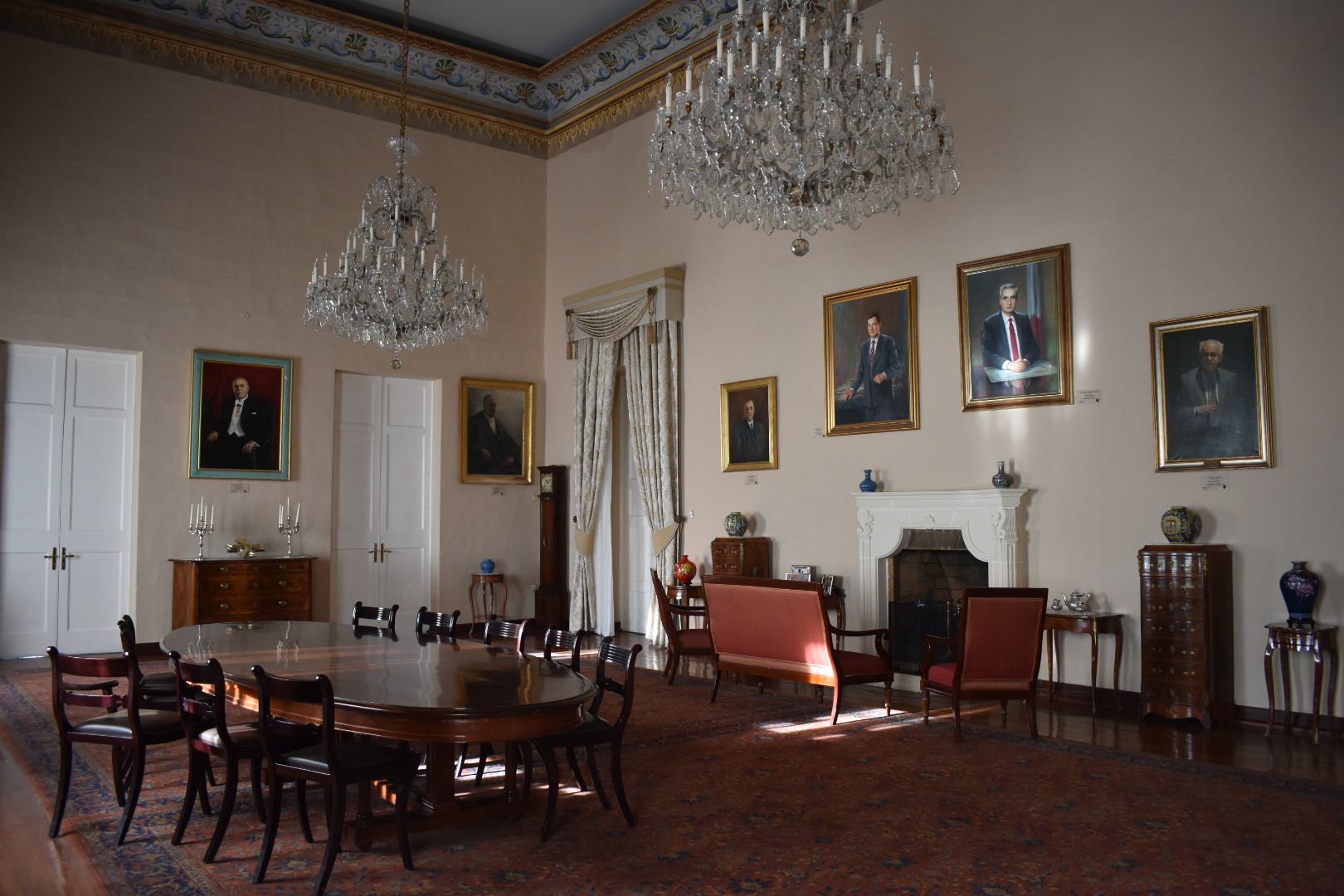
Cabinet Meeting Room at first floor; the non-aligned chair (left) is where the Prime Minister sits

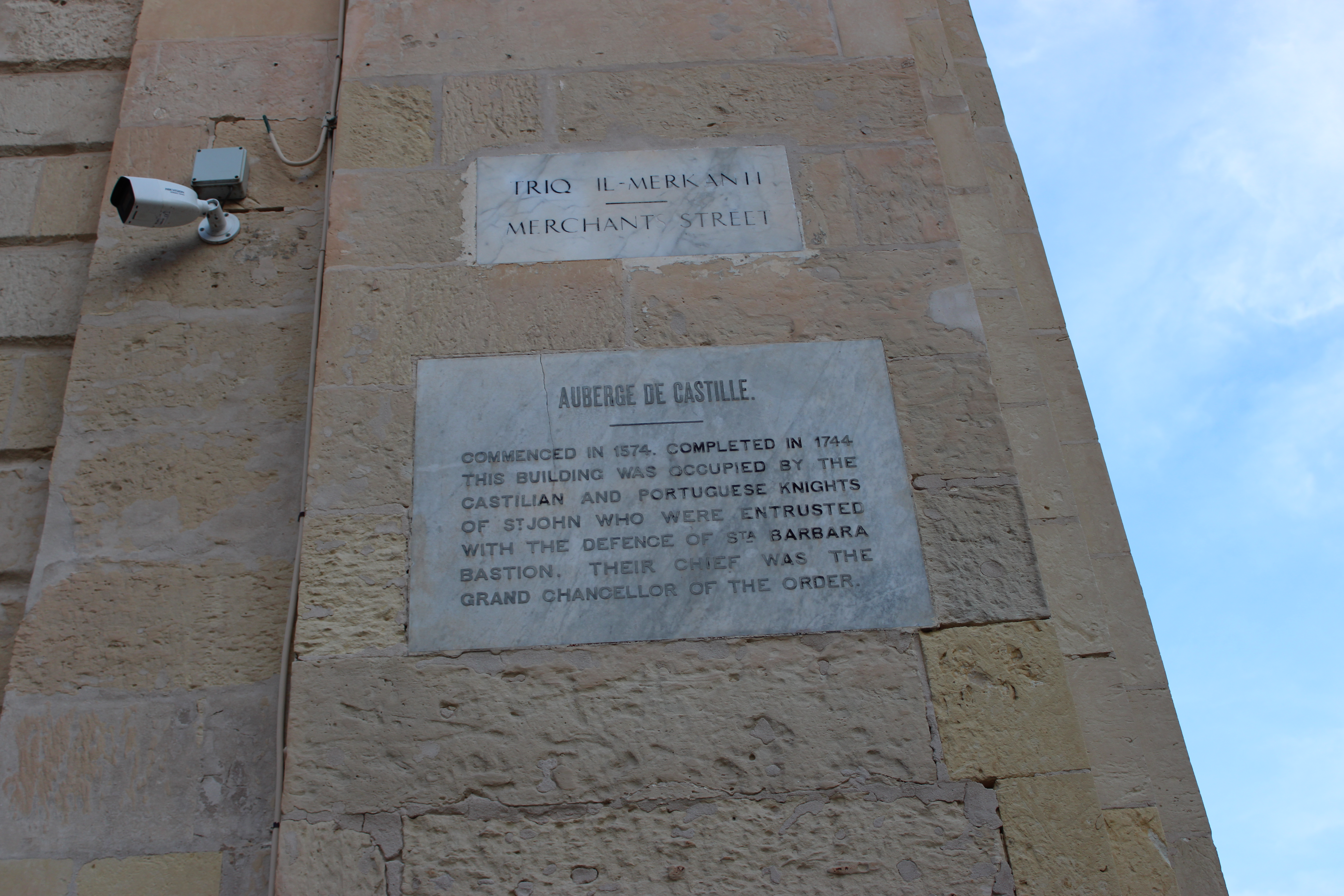
explanation sign on the building

Malta became an independent country as the State of Malta, with Queen Elizabeth II reigning as Queen of Malta, in September 1964. The country became a republic, as the Republic of Malta, in December 1974. In 1972, the Office of the Prime Minister of Malta moved from Auberge d'Aragon to Auberge de Castille. The Prime Minister leads the business of the government from the auberge, and the name Castille (or Kastilja in Maltese) is often used as a metonym to refer to the Prime Minister and his office.

Over the years, some of the stonework began to crumble and the façades were blackened. The building was restored between 2009 and 2014.

The building was included on the Antiquities List of 1925 together with the other auberges in Valletta. It is now scheduled as a Grade 1 national monument by the Malta Environment and Planning Authority, and it is also listed on the National Inventory of the Cultural Property of the Maltese Islands.

== Architecture ==
Auberge de Castille is built in the Baroque style, and it is a two-storey building with a rectangular plan and a central courtyard. Its façade is divided into eleven bays defined by pilasters in the central bays or plain panelling in the outer bays. Ornate windows are set within recessed panels. The building has a continuous cornice, and its corners are rusticated.

The main entrance is approached by a flight of steps, and the doorway is flanked by columns which support a trophy of arms and a bronze bust of Grand Master Manuel Pinto da Fonseca. A moulded window located above the bust is surmounted by Pinto's coat of arms. The centrepiece above the window bears the coats of arms of Castile and León and of Portugal. Just in front of the entrance are two historic canons, now used for decoration.

The auberge has been called "probably the finest building in Malta". Both the exterior and the interior, especially the ornate façade and the steps leading to the doorway, were designed to be imposing.

Auberge de Castille is linked to Auberge d'Italie across Merchants Street through a World War II-era underground air-raid shelter.

== Commemorative coins ==
Auberge de Castille was depicted on two commemorative coins minted in 2008 by the Central Bank of Malta. The coins show the auberge's portico on the reverse and the coat of arms of Malta on the obverse.

== See also ==
- Palazzo della Consulta, from which Architect Belli may have taken inspiration to design the auberge.
