= Maltese pataca =

The pataca of Malta was a large copper coin minted between the 16th and 17th centuries as a fiduciary coin – that is, a coin whose face value was worth more than its composition.

In 1530, the Maltese Islands (Malta and Gozo) were donated to the Order of Saint John by Emperor Charles V. Following the Siege of Malta of 1565, during the reign of Grandmaster Jean de Valette, a new fortified city, Valletta, had to be built. Due to the financial impact of the siege, in order to afford the labour of the several thousand people employed, the Maltese pataca was minted as fiduciary copper coins. The coins were inscripted with the words "Not money, but trust" (Latin: Non aes sed fides).

The last minting dates to the reign of Grandmaster Jean de Lascaris.
