= Pertti Mäkinen =

Finnish sculptor

Pertti Kalervo Mäkinen, born 16 September 1952 in Tyrvää, is a Finnish sculptor who is the designer of the Finnish 1 euro coin. He has also designed several commemorative coins for the Mint of Finland.

Mäkinen worked as a metal worker before entering an art school in the Finnish town Kankaanpää in 1976. After his graduation in 1979, Mäkinen has worked as a sculptor. He lives and works in Lavia.

== Works ==
=== Commemorative coins ===
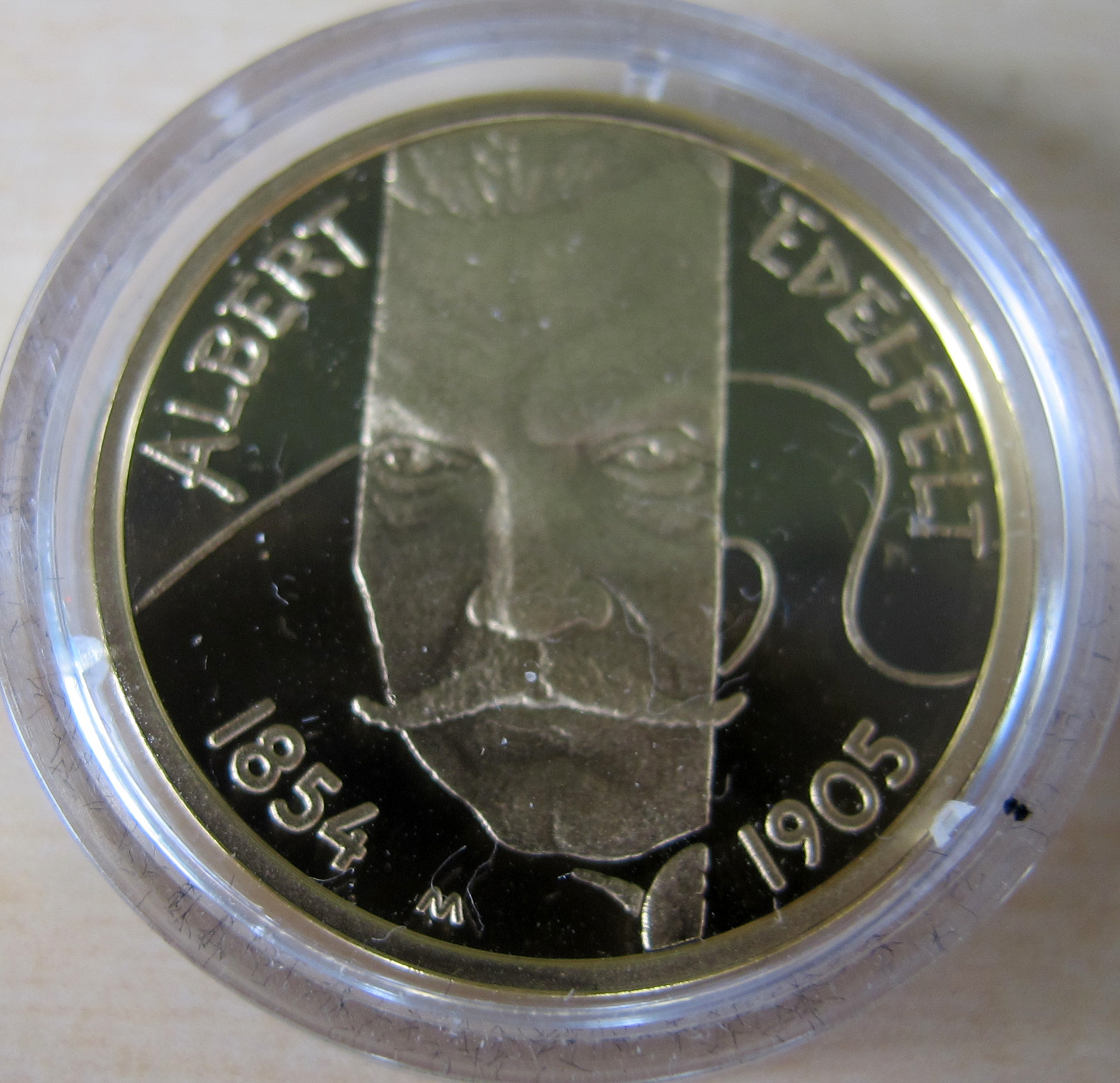
Albert Edelfelt 100€ commemorative coin (2004)

- 1983 World Championships in Athletics, 100mk, 1983.
- The Finnish European Union membership, 10mk, 1995.
- Elias Lönnrot, 10€, 2002.
- 2003 Ice Hockey World Championships, 5€, 2003.
- 2004 enlargement of the European Union, 2€, 2004.
- Tove Jansson, 10€, 2004.
- Albert Edelfelt, 100€, 2004.
- 60 years of peace, 10€, 2005.
- Åland convention 150 years, 5€, 2006.
- Parliament of Finland 100 years, 2€/10€, 2006.
- Women's suffrage 100 years, 2€, 2006.
- Fredrik Pacius 200 years, 10€, 2009.
- Henrik Wigström 150 years, 10€/20€, 2012.
- Literacy, 10€, 2014.
- Eino Leino, 2€/100€, 2016.

=== Public sculptures ===
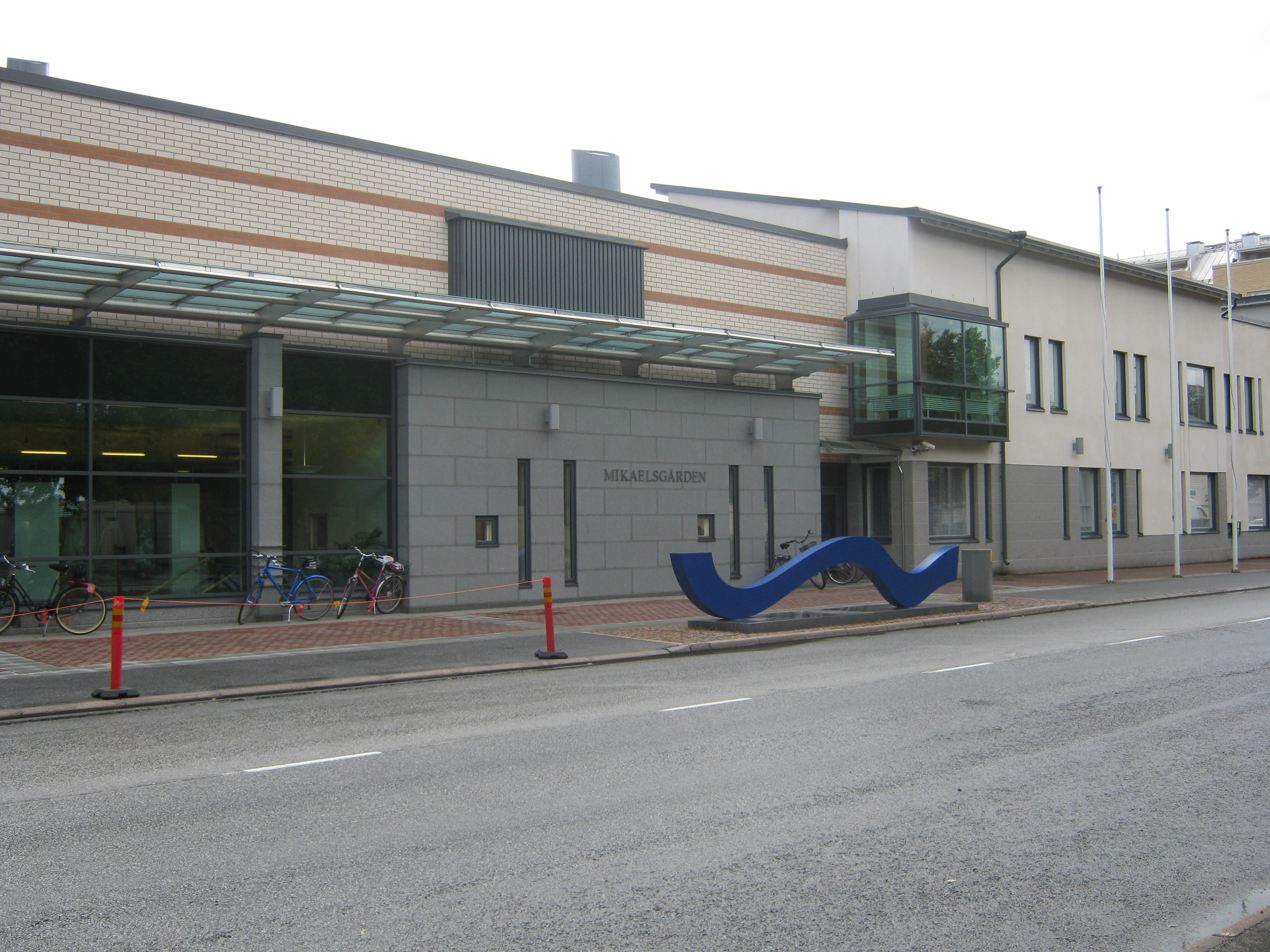
Vanavesi – Kölvattnet (2009)

- Raivaajapatsas, Lapua, 1983.
- Merenkulun muistomerkki, Oulu, 1985.
- Päivänkierto, Pori 1990.
- Lauri Viita monument, Tampere, 1991.
- Uittomiehen kosinta, Sastamala, 1992.
- Memorial of the Battle of Sampakoski, Lavia, 1998.
- Haitarijazz, Kouvola, 2003.
- Rakastunut viulu ja mandoliini, Kiikoinen, 2003.
- Toriparlamentti, Pori, 2008.
- Vanavesi – Kölvattnet, Pori, 2009.
