= Commemorative coins of Ireland =

Location of Ireland

Various commemorative coins denominated in Irish currency were issued until 2002, when the Irish pound (IEP/IR£) came to an end and was superseded by the euro. Since then there have been Irish commemorative coins denominated in euro.

== Irish pound ==
=== Silver ten-shilling piece (1966) ===
Topic: Easter rising of 1916		Designer: T. Hugh Paget	
Value: 10s	Alloy: .8333 Ag (.4858 oz)	Quantity: 2,000,000 20,000	Quality: Reg Proof
Issued: 1966	Diameter: 28.6 mm	Weight: 18.14 g	Market Value: -
The obverse depicted Patrick Pearse, while the dying Cúchulainn was on the reverse. 1,270,000 of the ten-shilling coins were melted in 1971.

=== Dublin Millennium 50p (1988) ===
Topic: Dublin Millennium		Designer: Thomas Ryan	
Value: 50p	Alloy: Cu 750 Ni 250	Quantity: 5,000,000 50,000	Quality: Reg Proof
Issued: 1988	Diameter: 30.0 mm	Weight: 13.5g	Market Value: -
The obverse depicts the Irish harp. The reverse design features the coat of arms of the City of Dublin and the coat of arms of the Lord Mayor of Dublin

=== UN anniversary pound coin (1995) ===
Topic: 50th Anniversary of the United Nations		Designer: -	
Value: £1	Alloy: Ag 925	Quantity: 25,000 Authorised (2,750 actual mintage?)	Quality: Proof -
Issued: 1995	Diameter: 38.61 mm	Weight: 28.28 g	Market value: -
The obverse depicts the Irish harp and the dates 1945 and 1995. The reverse design features a dove carrying in its beak a banner announcing the anniversary dates of 1945 and 1995.

=== Millennium pound coin (2000) ===
Topic: Millennium		Designer: Alan Ardiff & Garrett Stokes	
Value: £1	Alloy: -	Quantity: 5,000,000 95,000	Quality: Reg Proof
Issued: 2000	Diameter: 31.1 mm	Weight: 20 g	Market value: -
The obverse depicts the Irish harp. The reverse design features the Broighter Boat that dates from the first century BC.

== European Currency Unit (ECU) ==
Topic: Irish European Community Presidency & European integration		Designer: Thomas Ryan	
Value: 5ecu	Alloy: Ag 925	Quantity: 20,000 -	Quality: Proof -
Issued: 25.06.1990	Diameter: 28mm	Weight: 10g	Market Value: -
The obverse depicts the Irish harp surrounded by stars. The reverse design features an Irish red deer stag with mountains in the background
Topic: Irish European Community Presidency & European integration		Designer: Thomas Ryan	
Value: 10ecu	Alloy: Ag 925	Quantity: 20,000 -	Quality: Proof -
Issued: 25.06.1990	Diameter: 37.5mm	Weight: 28 g	Market Value: -
The obverse depicts the Irish harp surrounded by stars. The reverse features the Irish red deer with a Mountains background
Topic: Irish European Community Presidency & European integration		Designer: Thomas Ryan	
Value: 50ecu	Alloy: -	Quantity: 5,000 -	Quality: Proof -
Issued: 25.06.1990	Diameter: -	Weight: 15g	Market Value: -
The obverse depicts the Irish harp surrounded by stars The reverse design features the Irish Red Deer with a Mountains background

== See also ==
- Euro gold and silver commemorative coins (Ireland)
