= Europa Coins 2007 =

In 2007, the common theme for the Europa coins was European Realisation. At least 11 countries have participated:

- Austria – Reform of Voting Rights 1907
- Belgium – Treaty of Rome
- Czech Republic – 650th anniversary of the laying of the foundation stone of the Charles Bridge in Prague
- Finland – Adolf Erik Nordenskiöld and the finding of the North-East Passage
- France – Vauban
- Hungary – 200th anniversary of the birth of Lajos Batthyány
- Ireland – Influence of Celtic Culture on Europe
- Italy – Treaty of Rome
- Malta – Jean Parisot de la Valette
- Portugal – The passarola of Bartolomeu de Gusmão, 1709
- Spain – Treaty of Rome

== Belgium ==
Topic: Treaty of Rome		Designer: ?	
Value: €10	Alloy: Ag 925 (Silver) & Cu 75 (Copper)	Quantity: 40,000	Quality: Proof
Issued: 2007	Diameter: 33 mm	Weight: 18.75 g	Market Value: €32.50
The obverse shows a goose feather on top of a document, symbolizing the signature of the Treaty of Rome in 1957, the very first step in the creation of the European Union. Six lines can be seen coming out of the pen, each of them representing one of the original members. The reverse shows a map of the countries of the European Union. For the first time the map includes new members Bulgaria and Romania.
Topic: Treaty of Rome		Designer: ?	
Value: €50	Alloy: Au 999 (Gold)	Quantity: 2,500	Quality: Proof
Issued: 2007	Diameter: 21 mm	Weight: 6.22 g	Market Value: €170
Similarly to the 10 euro Treaty of Rome coin, the obverse shows a goose feather on top of a document, symbolizing the signature of the Treaty of Rome in 1957, the very first step in the creation of the European Union. Six lines can be seen coming out of the pen, each of them representing one of the original members. The reverse shows a map of the European Union as of 2007. The word "Belgium" is written in the three official languages, with the face value of 50 euro.

== Malta ==
Topic: Jean de la Valette		Designer: Noel Galea Bason	
Face Value: Lm5	Alloy: Silver 0.925	Quantity: 15,000	Quality: Silver Proof
Issued: 2007	Diameter: 38.61mm	Weight: 28.28g	Market Value: unknown
In 2007, the Central Bank of Malta issued the "La Valette" commemorative coin as the last silver coin denominated in Maltese lira. The obverse of the coins shows the Emblem of Malta with the year of issue 2007. The reverse depicts Grandmaster La Valette with the dates of his birth and death (1494–1568). These coins are being issued under the Europa Programme 2007 with the theme "European Realisation". The "Europa Star", the official logo of this programme, is also shown on the reverse. This coin was designed by Maltese engraver Mr Noel Galea Bason and has been minted at the Royal Dutch Mint.

Topic: Jean de la Valette		Designer: Noel Galea Bason	
Face Value: Lm25	Alloy: Gold 0.92	Quantity: 2,000	Quality: Gold Proof
Issued: 2007	Diameter: 21.00mm	Weight: 6.5g	Market Value: unknown
In 2007, the Central Bank of Malta issued the 'La Valette' commemorative coin as the last gold coin denominated in Maltese lira. The obverse of the coin shows the Emblem of Malta with the year of issue 2007. The reverse depicts Grandmaster La Valette with the dates of his birth and death (1494–1568). These coins are being issued under the Europa Programme 2007 with the theme "European Realisation". The "Europa Star", the official logo of this programme, is also shown on the reverse. This coin was designed by Maltese engraver Mr Noel Galea Bason and has been minted at the Royal Dutch Mint.
