= Europa coin programme =

Initiative for the issuance of collector-oriented coins in Europe

Eurostar logo

The Europa Coin Programme, also known as the European Silver Programme, or the Eurostar Programme, is an initiative dedicated to the issuance of collector-oriented legal tender coins in precious metals to celebrate European identity. The issuing authorities of EU member countries voluntarily contribute coins to the Europa Coin Programme. Multiple countries have participated in the programme, beginning in 2004. Some coins are denominated in euro, others are denominated in other currencies. Europa coins are legal tender.

== Eurostar logo ==
The Eurostar logo is the special mark used on coins to indicate participation in the Europa Coin Programme. It is a stylised combination of an "E" for Europe (or the euro sign), and a star (often used to symbolize a nation, e.g. on the EU flag). Coins must show the Eurostar distinctly and visibly to the naked eye, but not be integral to the coin's design.

== Coin features ==
- Coins must be at least 900 fine silver and of proof quality.
- Coins should be approximately "crown sized" -this allows for national traditions and customs.
- Coins must show the Eurostar logo (pictured above) distinctly, and visible to the naked eye, but not be integral to the coin's design.

== History ==
- 2004 – EU enlargement
- 2005 – Peace & freedom
- 2006 – Distinguished European figures
- 2007 – European Realisation
- 2008 – Cultural heritage
- 2009 – European Heritage
- 2010 – European Architecture
- 2011 – European Explorers
- 2012 – European Visual Artists
- 2013 – European Writers
- 2014 – European Composers
- 2015 – Anniversary of the UN
- 2016 – Five Ages of Europe : Modern Age
- 2017 – Five Ages of Europe : Age of Glass and Steel
- 2018 – Five Ages of Europe : Baroque and Rococo
