= Haloo Helsinki! discography =

- Studio albums: 8
- EPs: 1
- Live albums: 1
- Compilation albums: 1
- Singles: 13
- Promotional singles: 3

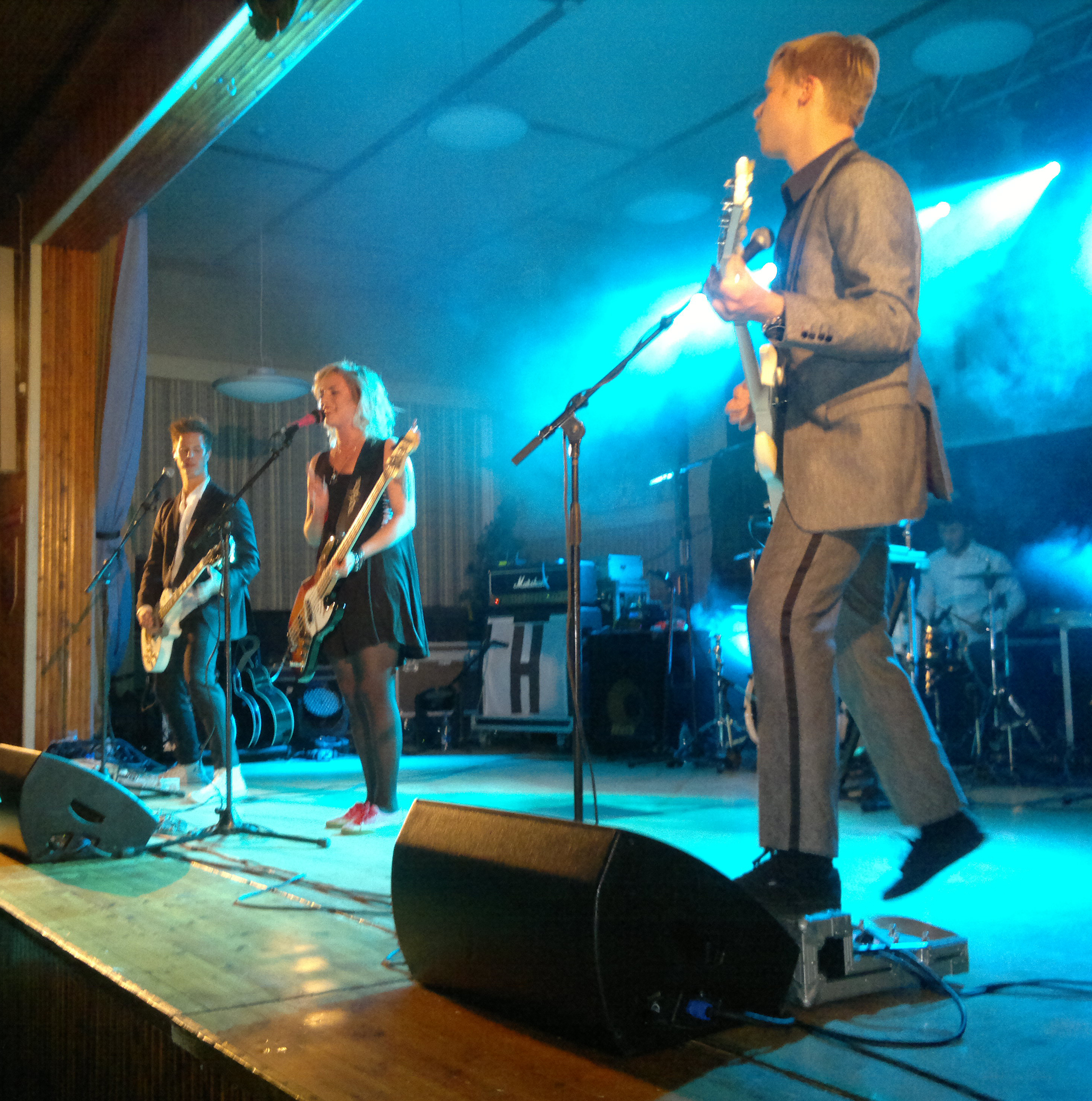

The discography of Haloo Helsinki!, a Finnish pop rock band, consists of eight studio albums, one live album, one compilation album, one extended play, 13 singles and three promotional singles. According to Musiikkituottajat, Haloo Helsinki! have sold over 73,000 certified records in Finland.

== Albums ==
=== Studio albums ===
List of studio albums, with selected details, chart positions, sales and certifications
Title	Album details	Peak chart positions	Sales	Certifications
Title	Album details	FIN	Sales	Certifications
Haloo Helsinki!	Released: 13 August 2008; Label: EMI Finland; Format: Digital download	6	N/A	
Enemmän kuin elää	Released: 28 August 2009; Label: EMI Finland; Format: Digital download	7	N/A	
III	Released: 25 February 2011; Label: EMI Finland; Format: Digital download	8	FIN: 22,264	FIN: Platinum
Maailma on tehty meitä varten	Released: 8 February 2013; Label: Ratas Music Group; Format: Digital download	1	FIN: 32,594	FIN: Platinum
Kiitos ei ole kirosana	Released: 3 October 2014; Label: Ratas Music Group; Format: Digital download	1		
Hulluuden Highway	Released: 10 March 2017; Label: Sony; Format: Digital download	1		
Älä pelkää elämää	Released: 10 September 2021; Label: Vallila, Sony; Format: Digital download, streaming	1		
Voiko enkelitkin eksyä	Released: 10 October 2025; Label: Vallila, Sony; Format: Digital download, streaming	2		

=== Live albums ===
List of live albums, with selected details and chart positions
Title	Album details	Peak chart positions
Title	Album details	FIN
Arena	Released: 27 November 2015; Label: Sony Music Entertainment Finland; Formats: CD+DVD, CD+Blu-ray, digital download	4

=== Compilation albums ===
List of compilation albums, with selected details and chart positions
Title	Album details	Peak chart positions
Title	Album details	FIN
Helsingistä maailman toiselle puolen – Parhaat 2007–2012	Released: 9 November 2012; Label: EMI Finland; Format: Digital download	49

== Extended plays ==
List of EPs, with selected details
Title	Details
Big-5: Haloo Helsinki!	Released: 26 November 2010; Label: EMI Finland; Formats: Digital download

== Singles ==
List of singles, showing title, year released, chart positions, sales and certifications
Title	Year	Peak chart positions			Sales	Certifications	Album
Title	Year	FIN	FIN Download	FIN Airplay	Sales	Certifications	Album
"Haloo Helsinki!"	2007	—	—	—			Haloo Helsinki!
"Perjantaina"	2008	—	—	—			Haloo Helsinki!
"Vieri vesi vieri"	2008	—	—	—			Haloo Helsinki!
"Jos elämä ois helppoo"	2009	—	25	—			Enemmän kuin elää
"Mun sydän sanoo niin"	2009	—	—	—			Enemmän kuin elää
"Valherakkaus"	2009	—	—	—			Enemmän kuin elää
"Kokeile minua"	2011	—	—	—			III
"Maailman toisella puolen"	2011	3	2	52	FIN: 12,226	FIN: Platinum	III
"Kuule minua"	2011	9	9	—			III
"Jos mun pokka pettää"	2012	8	7	54			III
"Huuda!"	2012	8	4	39			Maailma on tehty meitä varten
"Vapaus käteen jää"	2013	2	1	17	FIN: 6,041	FIN: Gold	Maailma on tehty meitä varten
"Beibi"	2014	1	1	1			Kiitos ei ole kirosana
"Rakas"	2016	2	2	1			Hulluuden Highway
"Hulluuden Highway"	2017	2	1	41			Hulluuden Highway
"Tuntematon"	2017	14	4	42			Non-album singles
"Joulun kanssas jaan" (featuring Cantores Minores)	2017	1	—	—			Non-album singles
"Texas" (featuring JVG)	2018	1	—	—			Non-album singles
"Kaksi ihmistä"	2018	5	—	—			Non-album singles
"Joulun kanssas jaan"	2018	3	—	—			Non-album singles
"Piilotan mun kyyneleet"	2021	1	—	—			Älä pelkää elämää
"Tulikärpäset"	2021	4	—	—			Älä pelkää elämää
"Reiviluola" (with Jambo and Etta)	2022	7	—	—			Non-album single
"Kaikki päättyy kyyneliin"	2024	11	—	—			Voiko enkelitkin eksyä
"Gardenia"	2025	11	—	—			Voiko enkelitkin eksyä
"Voiko enkelitkin eksyä"	2025	5	—	—			Voiko enkelitkin eksyä
"Huuda!" (featuring JVG)	2026	4	—	—			Non-album single
"—" denotes releases that did not chart.

=== Promotional singles ===
List of promotional singles, showing title, year released and chart positions
Title	Year	Peak chart positions			Album
Title	Year	FIN	FIN Download	FIN Airplay	Album
"Yksinäiset"	2008	—	—	—	Haloo Helsinki!
"Ei Eerika pääse taivaaseen"	2009	—	24	—	Enemmän kuin elää
"Maailma on tehty meitä varten"	2013	14	2	29	Maailma on tehty meitä varten
"Carpe diem"	2013	—	—	21	Maailma on tehty meitä varten
"Lähtövalmiina"	2014	—	—	33	Maailma on tehty meitä varten
"—" denotes releases that did not chart.

== Other charted songs ==
List of other charted songs, with selected chart positions
Title	Year	Peak chart positions	Album
Title	Year	FIN	Album
"Foliohattukauppias"	2021	17	Älä pelkää elämää
"Reiviluola"	2021	2	Älä pelkää elämää
"Tahdon"	2021	20	Älä pelkää elämää
"Pelikaani"	2021	13	Älä pelkää elämää
"Älä pelkää elämää"	2021	19	Älä pelkää elämää
"Ei suomalaiset tanssi"	2023	47	Texas EP
"Vegas"	2025	20	Voiko enkelitkin eksyä
