= Helsingistä maailman toiselle puolen – Parhaat 2007–2012 =

Compilation by Haloo Helsinki!

Compilation album by Haloo Helsinki!
- Released: 9 November 2012
- Genre: Pop rock
- Language: Finnish
- Label: EMI Finland

Haloo Helsinki! chronology
III (2011)	Helsingistä maailman toiselle puolen – Parhaat 2007–2012 (2012)	Maailma on tehty meitä varten (2013)

Helsingistä maailman toiselle puolen – Parhaat 2007–2012 (English: From Helsinki to the Other Side of the Globe – the Best of 2007–2012) is the first compilation album of the Finnish pop rock band Haloo Helsinki!. Released on 9 November 2012, the album peaked at number 49 on the Finnish Albums Chart.

== Track listing ==
No.	Title	Length
1.	"Haloo Helsinki!" (Hello, Helsinki!)	3:29
2.	"Perjantaina" (On Friday)	3:42
3.	"Vieri Vesi Vieri" (Run, Water, Run)	3:11
4.	"Yksinäiset" (The Lonely Ones)	4:01
5.	"Jos elämä ois helppoo" (If Life Were Easy)	3:33
6.	"Mun sydän sanoo niin" (My Heart Says So)	3:45
7.	"Ei Eerika pääse taivaaseen" (Eerika Won't Go to Heaven)	3:46
8.	"Valherakkaus" (Fake Love)	3:31
9.	"Kokeile minua" (Try Me)	3:54
10.	"Totuus ja valhe" (Truth and Lie)	3:34
11.	"Maailman toisella puolen" (On the Other Side of the Globe)	4:01
12.	"Entisessä elämässä" (In the Previous Life)	3:50
13.	"Kuule minua" (Hear Me)	4:51
14.	"Jos mun pokka pettää" (If I Can't Keep My Poker Face)	3:33
15.	"Maailman toisella puolen" (2012 Acoustic String Mix)	3:59

== Charts ==
Chart (2013)	Peak position
Finnish Albums (Suomen virallinen lista)	49
