= Songs for Mixed Chorus from the 1897 Promotional Cantata =

Choral song cycle by Jean Sibelius, arranged from the academic cantata (1897)

- Song cycle by Jean Sibelius
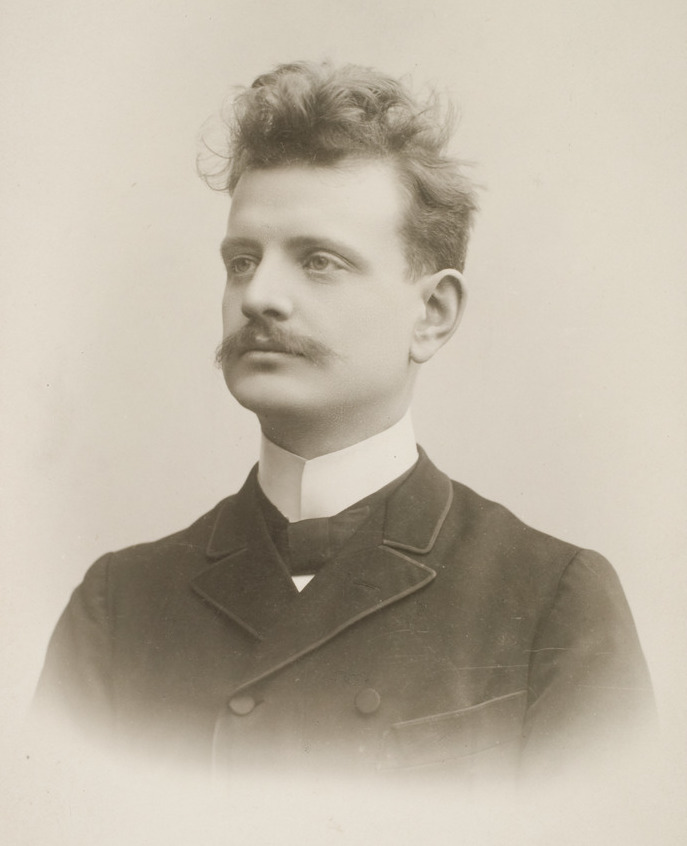
- The young composer (c. 1896)
- Native name: Lauluja sekaköörille 1897 vuoden promotiooni kantaatista
- Catalogue: JS 106 (original cantata)
- Opus: 23 (song cycle)
- Text: A. V. Koskimies
- Language: Finnish
- Composed: 1897, arr. 1897 or 1898
- Publisher: Fazer & Westerlund (1899) (Note: On 20 July 1905, the Helsinki-based music publisher Fazer & Westerlund (Helsingfors Nya Musikhandel) sold its Sibelius holdings (the publishing rights and printing plates) to the German firm of Breitkopf & Härtel.)
- Duration: 19.5 mins. (Op. 23) (Note: The duration of the original cantata is unknown, because the original score is lost.)

Premiere
- Date: 30 May 1897 (JS 104)
- Location: Helsinki, Grand Duchy of Finland
- Conductor: Jean Sibelius
- Performers: Helsinki Philharmonic Society; Ida Flodin (soprano); Abraham Ojanperä (baritone); amateur mixed choir

The Songs for Mixed Chorus from the 1897 Promotional Cantata (in Finnish: Lauluja sekaköörille 1897 vuoden promotiooni kantaatista; sometimes abbreviated as the Nine Songs), Op. 23, is a song cycle of a cappella pieces (Note: This excludes No. 8, for which bass drum, triangle, and cymbals provide accompaniment.) for soprano, baritone, and mixed choir a cappella arranged in 1898 by the Finnish composer Jean Sibelius. Sung in Finnish to words by the poet A. V. Koskimies, the songs were originally part of a larger orchestral work: the Cantata for the University Graduation Ceremonies of 1897 (Kantaatti tohtorinja maisterinvihkijäisissä 1897), JS 106. It is chronologically the third of Sibelius's nine orchestral cantatas, and belongs to a series of three such pieces—along with the Promotional Cantata of 1894 (JS 105) and the Coronation Cantata (JS 104, 1896)—that he wrote on commission from his employer at the time, the Imperial Alexander University (today the University of Helsinki). The complete score, however, is lost, although—in addition to the Op. 23 songs—some orchestral parts, as well as a rehearsal score with piano accompaniment, are extant.

== Performance history ==
The Songs for Mixed Chorus were performed for the first time in their entirety on 30 April 1904, in Viipuri, with the choral master and deputy judge Emil Forsström directing a group of thirty singers drawn from the area; the soloists were Ellen Relander and Edvard Ekström. The concert was at the Town Hall and had been organized by the Viipuri Friends of Music to raise funds for the local orchestra.

== Structure ==
The ten constituent songs in the cycle are as follows:

1. "March-like" (Marssin tapaan); "We the youth of Finland ..." ("Me nuoriso Suomen ...")
2. "Not too leisurely" (Ei lüan verkalleen); "The wind rocks ..." ("Tuuli tuudittele ...")
3. "Lightly" (Keveästi); "Oh hope, hope, you dreamer ..." ("Oi toivo, toivo, sä lietomieli ...")
4. "Quickly" (Nopeean); "Many on the sea of life ..." ("Montapa elon merellä ...")
5. "Leisurely" (Verkalleen); "The fading thoughts of the Earth ..." ("Sammuva sainio maan ...")
  - (a) Like a folk-song, briskly (Kansanlaulun tapaan, reippaasti); "We praise Thee, our Creator ..." ("Soi kiitokseksi Luojan ...")
  - (b) Simply (Yksinkertaisesti); "Blow, wind, more gently ..." ("Tuule, tuuli, leppeämmin ...")
6. "Briskly" (Reippaasti); "O love, your realm is limitless ..." ("Oi Lempi, sun valtas ääretön on ...")
7. "March-like" (Marssin tapaan); "As the swift current ..." ("Kun virta vuolas ...")
8. "Festively" (Juhlallisesti); "O precious Finland, Mother beyond compare ..." ("Oi kallis Suomi, äiti verraton ...")

Several of the song cycle's numbers, especially Nos. 1, 6a, and 6b, remain popular in Finland. Moreover, in 1913, Sibelius arranged No. 6a for female choir.

== Discography ==
External audio
- Sung by Pia Freund, Antti Suhonen, and the Tapiola Chamber Choir
- No. 1, "Me nuoriso Suomen"
- No. 2, "Tuuli tuudittele"
- No. 3, "Oi toivo, toivo, sä lietomieli"
- No. 4, "Montapa elon merellä"
- No. 5, "Sammuva sainio maan"
- No. 6a, "Soi kiitokseksi Luojan"
- No. 6b, "Tuule, tuuli, leppeämmin"
- No. 7, "Oi Lempi, sun valtas ääretön on"
- No. 8, "Kun virta vuolas"
- No. 9, "Oi kallis Suomi, äiti verraton"

The Finnish choral director Heikki Halme and the Eteläsuomalaisen Osakunnan Laulajatm (EOL) (Note: The literal English translation of Eteläsuomalaisen Osakunnan Laulajat is the "Singers Association of Southern Finland".) made the world premiere studio recording of the Op. 23 songs in 1975 for RCA Victor. The table below lists this and other commercially available recordings:

No.	Choral director	Ensemble	Soprano	Baritone	Runtime (Note: All runtimes are official, as printed on CD or LP liner notes.)	Rec. (Note: Refers to the year in which the performers recorded the work; this may not be the same as the year in which the recording was first released to the general public.)	Recording venue	Label	Ref.
1	Heikki Halme	Eteläsuomalaisen Osakunnan Laulajat	Terhikki Kilpiö	Kari Tamminen	19:23	1975	Helsinki German Church	RCA Victor	(Note: EOL–RCA Victor (YFPL 1–853) 1976)
2	Astrid Riska (1)	Jubilate Choir (1)	Monica Groop (1)	Juha Kotilainen	19:14	1992	Järvenpää Hall	Ondine	(Note: Jubilate Choir–Ondine (ODE 805–2) 1993)
3	Hannu Norjanen	Tapiola Chamber Choir	Pia Freund	Antti Suhonen	20:09	1997	Roihuvuori Church	Finlandia	(Note: Tapiola Chamber Choir–Finlandia (0630–19054–2) 1998)
4	Astrid Riska (2)	Jubilate Choir (2)	Monica Groop (2)	Sauli Tülikainen	19:18	1998	Tapiola Hall	BIS	(Note: Jubilate Choir–BIS (CD–998) 1999)
5	Heikki Seppanen	Estonian Philharmonic Chamber Choir	Jenny Carlstedt	Arttu Kataja	18:36	2014	Järvenpää Hall	Ondine	(Note: Estonian Phil. Chamber Choir–Ondine (ODE 1260–2D) 2015)

== Notes, references, and sources ==
Notes

Sources

- Barnett, Andrew (2007). Sibelius. New Haven, Connecticut: Yale University Press. ISBN 978-0-300-16397-1.
- Dahlström, Fabian [in Swedish] (2003). Jean Sibelius: Thematisch-bibliographisches Verzeichnis seiner Werke [Jean Sibelius: A Thematic Bibliographic Index of His Works] (in German). Wiesbaden: Breitkopf & Härtel. ISBN 3-7651-0333-0.
- Hovinen, Juha (1998). Sibelius: Complete Choral Songs for Mixed, Female, and Children's Voices (CD booklet). Translated by Mäntyjärvi, Jaakko. Hannu Norjanen & Tapiola Chamber Choir. Finlandia. p. 12–21. 0630–19054–2. OCLC 42657350
- Tawaststjerna, Erik (2008) [1965/1967; trans. 1976]. Sibelius: Volume I, 1865–1905. Translated by Layton, Robert. London: Faber and Faber. ISBN 978-0-571-24772-1.
- Virgin, Sheahan (2024). "Many on the Sea of Life: Sibelius's Op. 23 Songs". Sibelius One. 10 (January). International Sibelius One Society: 26–33. ISSN 2057-3464.
- Ylivuori, Sakari (2015). Sibelius: Complete Works for Mixed Choir (CD booklet). Translated by Mäntyjärvi, Jaakko. Heikki Seppänen & Estonian Philharmonic Chamber Choir. Ondine. p. 6–7. ODE 1260–2D. OCLC 907135077
