= Cantata for the University Graduation Ceremonies of 1894 =

Academic cantata by Jean Sibelius (1894)

Promotional Cantata of 1894
- Cantata by Jean Sibelius
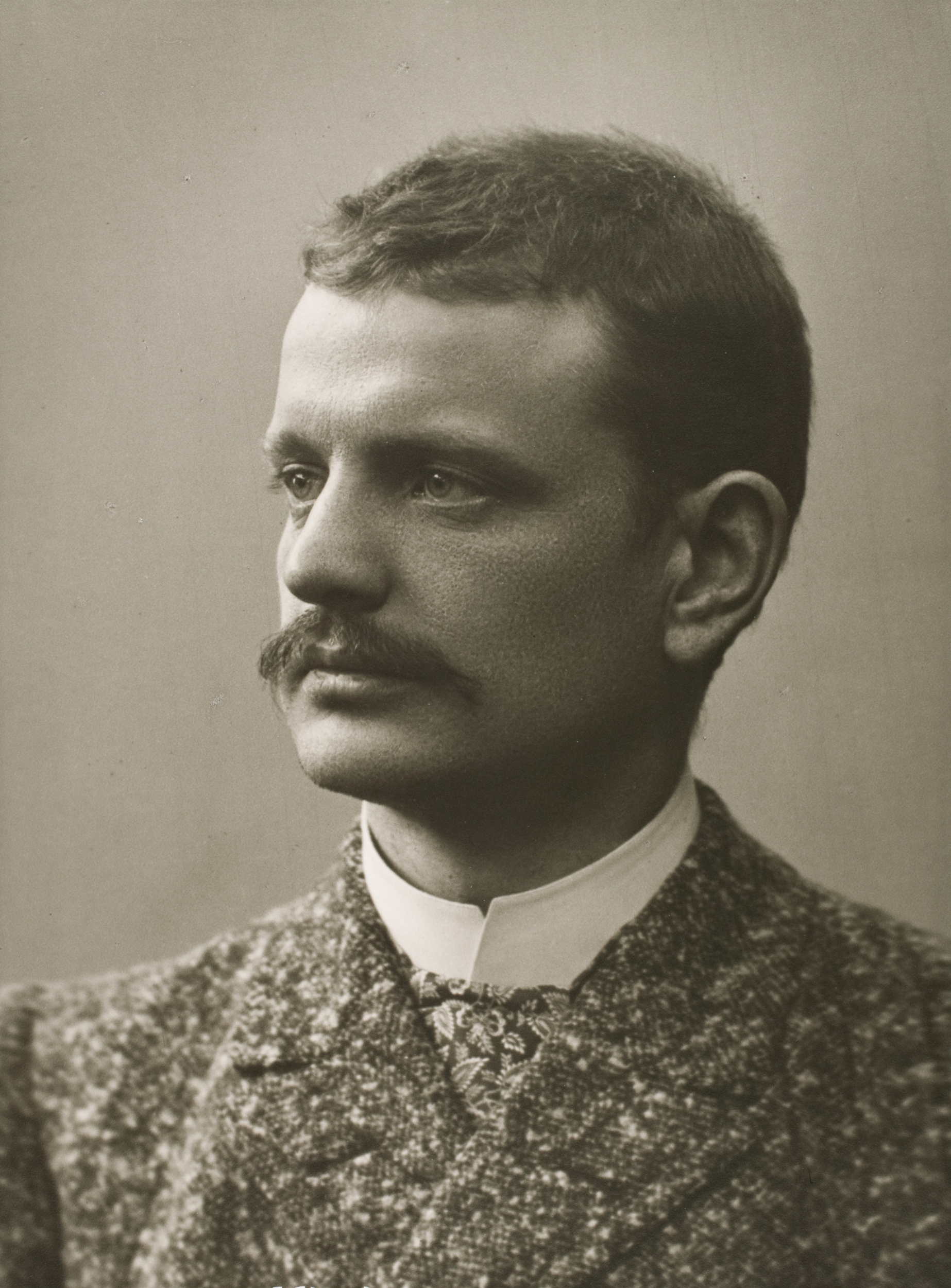
- The composer (c. 1891)
- Native name: Promootiokantaatti 1894
- Catalogue: JS 105
- Text: Kasimir Leino (né Lönnbohm)
- Language: Finnish
- Composed: 1894
- Duration: 28 minutes
- Movements: 3 (No. 3 only partially survives)

Premiere
- Date: 31 May 1894
- Location: Helsinki, Grand Duchy of Finland
- Conductor: Jean Sibelius
- Performers: Helsinki Orchestral Association; Aino Ackté (soprano); Abraham Ojanperä (baritone); amateur mixed choir

The Cantata for the University Graduation Ceremonies of 1894 (in Finnish: Kantaatti tohtorinja maisterinvihkijäisissä 1894; sometimes called the Promotional Cantata of 1894 (in Finnish: Promootiokantaatti 1894) for short), JS 105, is a three-movement cantata for soprano, baritone, mixed choir, and orchestra written in 1894 by the Finnish composer Jean Sibelius. It is chronologically the first of Sibelius's nine orchestral cantatas, and belongs to a series of three such pieces—along with the Coronation Cantata (JS 104, 1896) and the Promotional Cantata of 1897 (JS 106)—that he wrote on commission from his employer at the time, the Imperial Alexander University (today the University of Helsinki).

The cantata premiered on 31 May 1894 in Helsinki with Sibelius conducting the Helsinki Orchestral Association and an amateur choir; (Note: Newspapers advertisements listed it as the "Symphonic Choir" (in Finnish: "Sinfoniakuoro"; in Swedish: "Sinfonikören").) the soloists were the Finnish soprano Aino Ackté and the Finnish baritone Abraham Ojanperä.

In 1896, Sibelius arranged the conclusion of Movement II as the Festive March (Juhlamarssi) for mixed choir a cappella.

== Instrumentation ==
The Promotional Cantata of 1894 is scored for the following instruments and voices, organized by family (vocalists, woodwinds, brass, percussion, and strings):

- Soprano, baritone, and mixed choir (SATB)
- 2 flutes, 1 oboe, 2 clarinets, and 1 bassoon
- 2 horns, 2 trumpets, 3 trombones, and tuba
- Timpani, bass drum, cymbals, and triangle
- Violins (I and II), violas, cellos, and double basses

== Structure ==
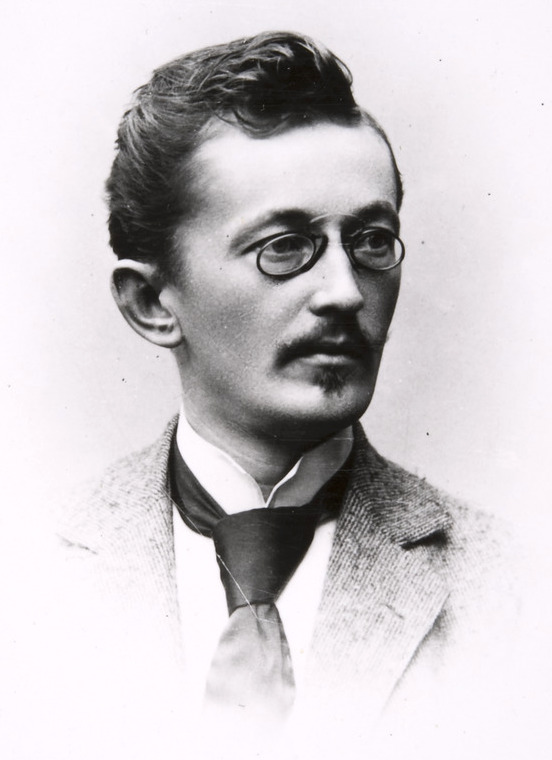
The Finnish author Kasimir Leino (né Lönnbohm)

The Promotional Cantata of 1894 is in three movements. They are:

1. Molto maestoso ed adagio; "When the world, when nature was created ..." ("Syntyi kun maailmat, luonto kun luotiin ...")
2. Allegro assai – Maestoso (alla marcia); "We burned the wilderness ..." ("Kaskeksi korvet ne raadettiin ...")
3. Andantino

Movement I is scored for mixed choir and orchestra, while Movement II adds to these forces solo parts for soprano and baritone. Finally, Movement III is for soprano and orchestra, although the solo part (which occurs during a brief, middle trio section) has not survived; however, according to the Sibelius biographer Andrew Barnett, "luckily the lack of a solo part does not render the piece unperformable [as a movement for orchestra alone]".

The cantata remains in manuscript, although will eventually be published as part of the Jean Sibelius Works (JSW) critical edition, an ongoing collaborative project between the National Library of Finland, Breitkopf & Härtel, and the Sibelius Society of Finland. (Begun in 1996, the series is projected at 52 volumes and will eventually cover all of Sibelius's completed original compositions and arrangements, including relevant JS-designated works.)

== Discography ==
The Finnish conductor Leif Segerstam and the Helsinki Philharmonic Orchestra, joined by the Finnish Philharmonic Choir, made the world premiere studio recording of the first two movements of Cantata for the University Graduation Ceremonies of 1894 in April 1999 for Ondine; the soloists were the Finnish soprano Soile Isokoski and the Finnish baritone Jaakko Kortekangas. To date, the only other recording dates to August 2004; it is by the Finnish conductor Osmo Vänskä, the Lahti Symphony Orchestra, and the Dominante, who recorded the piece for the Swedish label BIS Records. Importantly, Vänskä was the first to record what survives of Movement III (again, the soprano part is lost). The table below contains additional details about these two recordings:

No.	Conductor	Orchestra	Chorus	Soprano	Baritone	Rec. (Note: Refers to the year in which the performers recorded the work; this may not be the same as the year in which the recording was first released to the general public.)	Time (Note: All runtimes are official, as printed on CD or LP liner notes.)	Venue	Label	Ref.
1	Leif Segerstam	Helsinki Philharmonic Orchestra	Finnish Philharmonic Choir	Soile Isokoski	Jaakko Kortekangas	1999	17:13 (Note: Movements I and II only.)	Finlandia Hall	Ondine	(Note: L. Segerstam—Ondine (ODE 936–2) 1999)
2	Osmo Vänskä	Lahti Symphony Orchestra	Dominante Choir	Helena Juntunen	Juha Hostikka	2004	31:47	Sibelius Hall	BIS	(Note: O. Vänskä—BIS (CD–1365) 2005)

In addition, the Finnish choral director Astrid Riska and the Jubilate Choir made the world premiere studio recording of the Festive March for mixed choir a cappella in the spring of 1992 for Ondine. The table below lists this and other commercially available recordings:

No.	Choral director	Ensemble	Runtime (Note: All runtimes are official, as printed on CD or LP liner notes.)	Rec. (Note: Refers to the year in which the performers recorded the work; this may not be the same as the year in which the recording was first released to the general public.)	Recording venue	Label	Ref.
1	Astrid Riska (1)	Jubilate Choir (1)	3:05	1992	Järvenpää Hall	Ondine	(Note: Jubilate Choir—Ondine (ODE 805–2) 1993)
2	Astrid Riska (2)	Jubilate Choir (2)	4:02	1996	Danderyds gymnasium	BIS	(Note: Jubilate Choir—BIS (CD–825) 1996)
3	Hannu Norjanen	Tapiola Chamber Choir	3:05	1997	Roihuvuori Church	Finlandia	(Note: Tapiola Chamber Choir—Finlandia (0630–19054–2) 1998)
4	Heikki Seppanen	Estonian Philharmonic Chamber Choir	2:52	2014	Järvenpää Hall	Ondine	(Note: Estonian Phil. Chamber Choir—Ondine (ODE 1260–2D) 2015)

== Notes, references, and sources ==
Notes

Sources

- "The critical edition: Jean Sibelius Works". sibeliussociety.fi. Sibelius Society of Finland.
- Barnett, Andrew (2005). Sibelius: Song of the Earth (booklet). Osmo Vänskä, Lahti Symphony Orchestra, & Dominante Choir. BIS. BIS CD-1365. OCLC 62255940
- Barnett, Andrew (2007). Sibelius. New Haven: Yale University Press. ISBN 978-0-300-11159-0.
- Dahlström, Fabian [in Swedish] (2003). Jean Sibelius: Thematisch-bibliographisches Verzeichnis seiner Werke [Jean Sibelius: A Thematic Bibliographic Index of His Works] (in German). Wiesbaden: Breitkopf & Härtel. ISBN 3-7651-0333-0.
- Tiilikainen, Jukka; Salmenhaara, Erkki (1999). Sibelius: Cantata for the Concerment Ceremony of 1894 / Coronation Cantata / Academic March / Andante festivo / Finlandia (booklet). Translated by Hallberg-Rautalin, Irma. Leif Segerstam, Helsinki Philharmonic Orchestra, & Finnish Philharmonic Choir. Ondine. ODE 936-2.
