= Six Partsongs =

Choral songs by Jean Sibelius (1893–1901)

- Choral works by Jean Sibelius
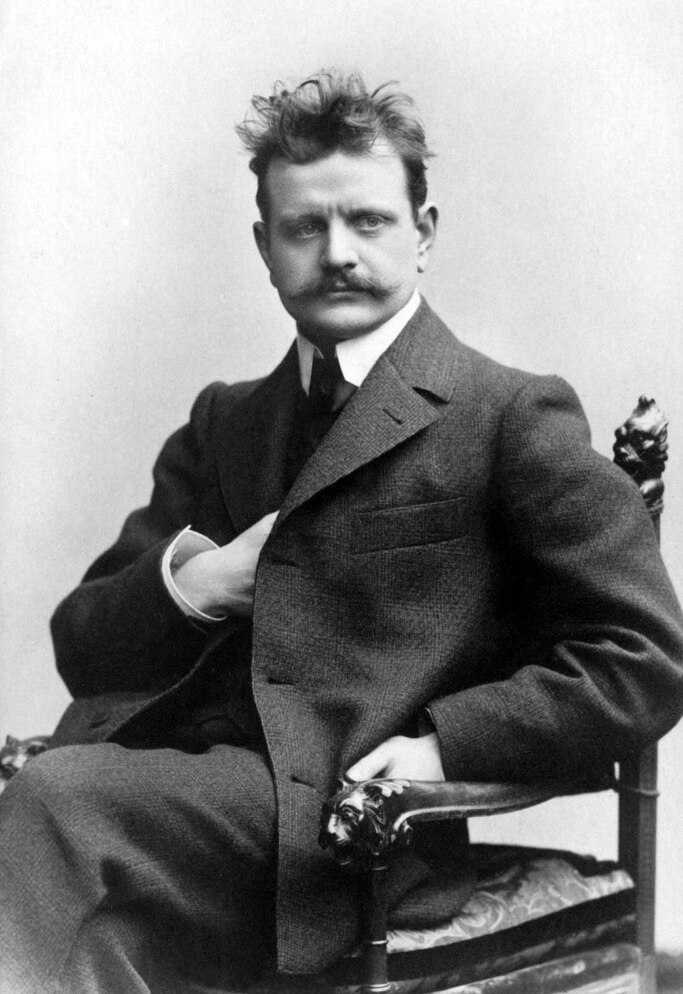
- The composer (c. 1899)
- Opus: 18
- Text: Nos. 1, 4: Kanteletar; Nos. 2–3: Kalevala; Nos. 5–6: Aleksis Kivi
- Language: Finnish
- Composed: 1893–1901
- Publisher: piecemeal by several firms

The Six Partsongs (sometimes listed as the Six Songs; deprecated title Nine Partsongs or Nine Songs), Op. 18, is a collection of Finnish-language a cappella choral pieces written from 1893 to 1901 by the Finnish composer Jean Sibelius. Originally composed for male choir, the composer subsequently arranged Nos. 1, 3–4, and 6 (under the same catalogue number) for mixed choir. The Six Partsongs are as follows:

- "Sortunut ääni" ("The Broken Voice"), Op. 18/1 (1898–1899, arr. for SATB 1898–1899)
- "Terve kuu" ("Hail, Moon"), Op. 18/2 (1901)
- "Venematka" ("The Boat Journey"), Op. 18/3 (1893, arr. for SATB 1914)
- "Saarella palaa" ("Fire on the Island"), Op. 18/4 (1895, arr. for SATB 1898)
- "Metsämiehen laulu" ("The Woodsman's Song"), Op. 18/5 (1899)
- "Sydämeni laulu" ("Song of My Heart"), Op. 18/6 (1898, arr. for SATB 1904)

The lyrics for Nos. 2–3 come from Finland's national epic, the Kalevala, while Nos. 1 and 4 draw on its companion book of poetry, the Kanteletar; finally, for Nos. 5–6 Sibelius set excerpts from the novel Seven Brothers (Seitsemän veljestä) by Aleksis Kivi.

== Music ==
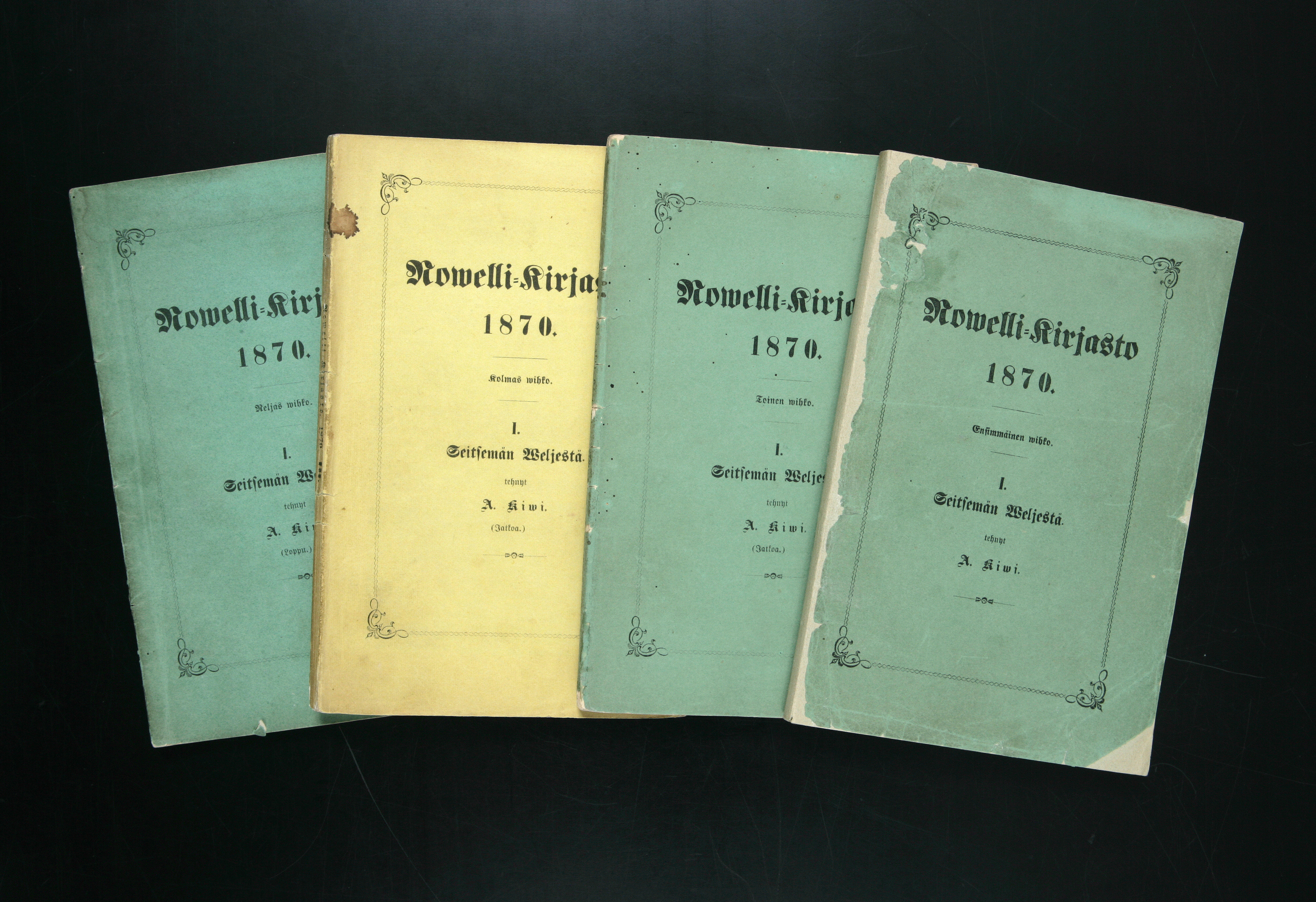
Aleksis Kivi's Seven Brothers (1870), verses from which Sibelius set in Op. 18, Nos. 5–6

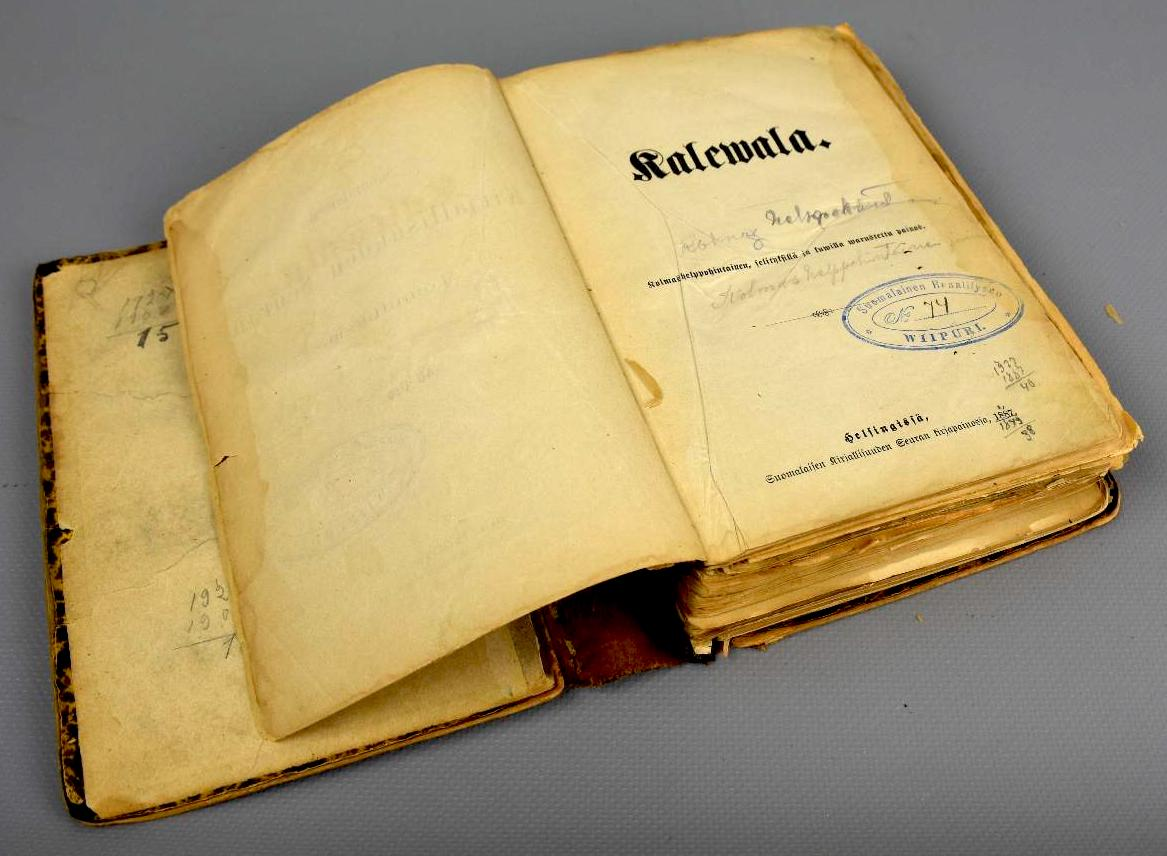
Finland's national epic, the Kalevala, verses from which Sibelius set in Op. 18, Nos. 2–3

=== No. 1: "Sortunut ääni" ===
- 1898–1899 for male choir; arranged for mixed choir in 1898–1899
- The tempo marking is: Ei liian hitaasti [Not too slowly; Nicht zu langsam].
- It has a duration of about 1.5 minutes.
- The text comes from poem No. LVII (57) of the Kanteletar.
- Version for male choir premiered on 21 April 1899 in Helsinki by Heikki Klemetti and the YL Male Voice Choir.
- The male choir version was published by YL.
- Dahlström does not report the premiere of the version for mixed choir.
- The mixed choir version was published by K. E. Holm in 1898 as part of Sävelistö music magazine, edited by Emil Forsström

=== No. 2: "Terve kuu" ===
- 1901 for male choir
- The tempo marking is: Reippaasti, musta vakavasti [Briskly, but solemnly; Frisch, aber ernst].
- It has a duration of about three minutes.
- The text comes from the Kalevala, Runo XLIX (49) (lines 403–422).
- Premiered on 30 May 1901 by Klemetti and Suomen Laulu.
- Published by Fazer & Westerlund in 1902.
- Was not arranged for mixed choir.

=== No. 3: "Venemakta" ===
- 1893 for male choir; arranged for mixed choir in 1914
- The tempo marking is: Reippaasti [Briskly; Frisch]
- It has a duration of about two minutes.
- The text comes from the Kalevala, Runo XL (40) (lines 1–16).
- Version for male choir premiered on 4 April 1893 in Helsinki by Jalmari Hahl and the YL Male Voice Choir.
- The male choir version was published by K. E. Holm in 1895.

=== No. 4: "Saarella palaa" ===
- Op. 18/4 (1895; arranged for mixed choir in 1898)
- The text is the Kanteletar
- arr. for SATB

=== No. 5: "Metsämiehen laulu" ===
- Op. 18/5 (1899)
- The tempo marking is: Alla marcia
- The text is from Seven Brothers

=== No. 6: "Sydämeni laulu" ===
- Op. 18/6 (1898; arranged for mixed choir in 1904)
- The tempo marking is: Lento assai
- The text is from Seven Brothers

=== Partsongs related to Op. 18 ===
The following three partsongs were at one time listed by Sibelius under the Op. 18 catalogue number but were removed subsequently. The deprecated title of Nine Partsongs, then, refers to their inclusion:

- "Isanmaalle" ("To the Fatherland"), JS 98 (1899; revised and arranged for mixed choir 1900; revised version arranged for male choir in 1908) ... text by Paavo Cajander
- "Veljeni vierailla maalla" ("My Brothers Abroad"), JS 217 (1904) ... text by Juhani Aho
- "Min rastas raataa" ("Busy as a Thrush"), JS 129 (1898) ... for mixed choir only ... text from the Kanteletar

== Discography ==
External audio
- Sung by the YL Male Voice Choir
- No. 1, "Sortunut ääni"
- No. 2, "Terve kuu"
- No. 3, "Venemakta"
- No. 4, "Saarella palaa"
- No. 5, "Metsämiehen laulu"
- No. 6, "Sydämeni laulu"
- JS 98, "Isanmaalle"
- JS 217, "Veljeni vierailla maalla"

External audio
- Sung by the Dominante Choir
- No. 1, "Sortunut ääni"
- No. 3, "Venemakta"
- No. 4, "Saarella palaa"
- No. 6, "Sydämeni laulu"
- JS 98, "Isanmaalle"
- JS 129, "Min rastas raataa"

The sortable table below lists commercially available recordings of the Op. 18 partsongs, as well as the three related partsongs noted above:

| No. | Ensemble | Conductor | Partsong runtime (Note: All runtimes are official, as printed on CD or LP liner notes.) | | | | | | | | | Rec. (Note: Refers to the year in which the performers recorded the work; this may not be the same as the year in which the recording was first released to the general public.) | Recording venue | Label | Ref. |
| No. | Ensemble | Conductor | Op. 18/1 | Op. 18/2 | Op. 18/3 | Op. 18/4 | Op. 18/5 | Op. 18/6 | JS 98 | JS 129 | JS 217 | Rec. | Recording venue | Label | Ref. |
|---|---|---|---|---|---|---|---|---|---|---|---|---|---|---|---|
| 1 | YL Male Voice Choir (1) | Matti Hyökki (1) | 1:33 | 3:28 | 2:00 | 1:25 | 1:40 | 2:38 | 2:01 | —N/a | 3:31 | 1986 | German Church, Helsinki | Finlandia | (Note: YL Male Voice Choir–Finlandia (FACD 205 S) 1987) |
| 2 | Candomino Choir | Tauno Satomaa | 1:30 | —N/a | —N/a | 1:34 | —N/a | 2:09 | —N/a | —N/a | —N/a | 1987 | [Unknown], Espoo | Finlandia | (Note: Candomino Choir–Finlandia (FACD 918 S) 1987) |
| 3 | Jubilate Choir (1) | Astrid Riska (1) | 1:24 | —N/a | 2:17 | 1:07 | —N/a | 2:06 | —N/a | 1:15 | —N/a | 1992 | Järvenpää Hall | Ondine | (Note: Jubilate Choir–Ondine (ODE 805–2) 1993) |
| 4 | Jubilate Choir (2) | Astrid Riska (2) | 1:22 | —N/a | 2:16 | 1:12 | —N/a | 2:56 | 2:19 | 1:17 | —N/a | 1996 | Danderyds gymnasium | BIS | (Note: Jubilate Choir–BIS (CD–825) 1996) |
| 5 | Tapiola Chamber Choir | Hannu Norjanen | 1:25 | —N/a | 1:51 | 1:32 | —N/a | 2:55 | 2:01 | 1:22 | —N/a | 1997 | Roihuvuori Church | Finlandia | (Note: Tapiola Chamber Choir–Finlandia (0630–19054–2) 1998) |
| 6 | Accentus Chamber Choir | Eric Ericson | 1:49 | —N/a | —N/a | —N/a | —N/a | —N/a | 2:11 | —N/a | —N/a | 2001 | Church Notre Dame de Liban | Naive | (Note: Accentus Chamber Choir–Naive (V4924) 2002) |
| 7 | YL Male Voice Choir (2) | Matti Hyökki (2) | 1:20 | 3:10 | 1:34 | 1:23 | 1:36 | 2:12 | 1:47 | —N/a | 3:13 | 2006 | New Pavilon, Kauniainen | BIS (Note: This recording is of the original 1899 version of Isanmaalle, JS 98) | (Note: YL Male Voice Choir–BIS (CD–1433) 2008) |
| 8 | Polytech Choir | Juha Kuivanen | 1:09 | 2:56 | —N/a | 1:10 | —N/a | 2:26 | —N/a | —N/a | —N/a | 2007 | Riihimäki Garrison Church | PK | (Note: Polytech Choir–PK (PKCD20) 2008) |
| 9 | Dominante Choir | Seppo Murto | 1:32 | —N/a | 1:37 | 1:19 | —N/a | 3:01 | 2:03 | 1:17 | —N/a | 2010 | New Pavilon, Kauniainen | BIS | (Note: Dominante Choir–BIS (CD–1889) 2012) |
| 10 | Klemetti Institute Chamber Choir | Heikki Liimola | 1:37 | —N/a | 1:43 | —N/a | —N/a | —N/a | —N/a | —N/a | —N/a | 2010 | Tampere Hall | Alba | (Note: Klemetti Institute Chamber Choir–Alba (ABCD 329) 2010) |
| 11 | Estonian Philharmonic Chamber Choir | Heikki Seppanen | 1:23 | —N/a | 1:44 | 1:13 | —N/a | 2:55 | 2:05 | 1:10 | —N/a | 2014 | Järvenpää Hall | Ondine | (Note: Estonian Phil. Chamber Choir–Ondine (ODE 1260–2D) 2015) |
| 12 | Ensemble Nobiles | —N/a | 1:46 | —N/a | —N/a | —N/a | —N/a | 2:32 | 2:08 | —N/a | —N/a | 2016 | Zur Ratte, Leipzig | Genuin | (Note: Ensemble Nobiles–Genuin (GEN 17469) 2017) |

== Notes, references, and sources ==
=== Sources ===
- Barnett, Andrew (2007). Sibelius. New Haven, Connecticut: Yale University Press. ISBN 978-0-300-16397-1.
- Dahlström, Fabian [in Swedish] (2003). Jean Sibelius: Thematisch-bibliographisches Verzeichnis seiner Werke [Jean Sibelius: A Thematic Bibliographic Index of His Works] (in German). Wiesbaden: Breitkopf & Härtel. ISBN 3-7651-0333-0.
