= Op. 18 =

In music, Op. 18 stands for Opus number 18. Compositions that are assigned this number include:

- Balakirev – Islamey
- Beethoven – String Quartets Nos. 1–6, Op. 18
- Berlioz – Tristia
- Brahms – String Sextet No. 1
- Britten – Les Illuminations
- Chopin – Grande valse brillante in E-flat major
- Finzi – Let Us Garlands Bring
- Larsson – A Winter's Tale (En vintersaga), a suite for orchestra (1938)
- Mendelssohn – String Quintet No. 1
- Nielsen – Søvnen
- Oswald – Piano Quintet
- Rachmaninoff – Piano Concerto No. 2
- Ries – Violin Sonata No. 9
- Saint-Saëns – Piano Trio No. 1
- Schoenberg – Die glückliche Hand
- Schumann – Arabeske
- Sibelius – Six Partsongs, collection of a cappella choral songs (1893–1901)
- Strauss – Violin Sonata
- Tchaikovsky – The Tempest
- Zdeněk – The Bride of Messina
- Zemlinsky – Lyric Symphony
