= Cantata for the Coronation of Nicholas II =

Celebratory cantata by Jean Sibelius (1896)

Coronation Cantata
- Cantata by Jean Sibelius
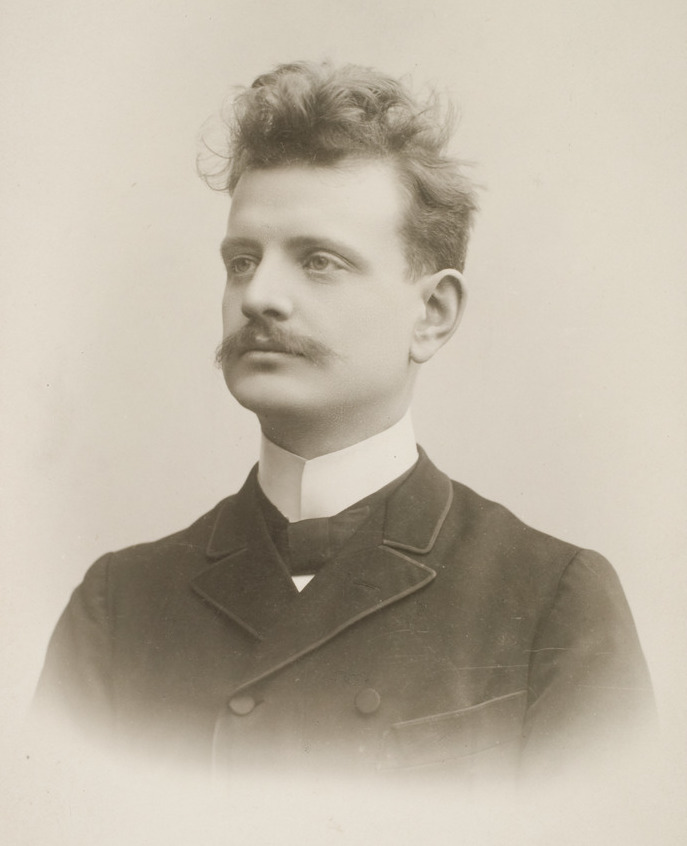
- The young composer (c. 1896)
- Native name: Kruunajaiskantaatti
- Catalogue: JS 104
- Text: Paavo Cajander
- Language: Finnish
- Composed: 1896
- Duration: 18 minutes
- Movements: 2

Premiere
- Date: 2 November 1896
- Location: Helsinki, Grand Duchy of Finland
- Conductor: Jean Sibelius
- Performers: Helsinki Philharmonic Society; amateur choir

The Cantata for the Coronation of Emperor Nicholas II (in Finnish: Kantaatti ilo- ja onnentoivotusjuhlassa marraskuun 2 päivänä 1896; sometimes referred to as Coronation Cantata (in Finnish: Kruunajaiskantaatti) for short), JS 104, is a two-movement cantata for mixed choir and orchestra written in 1896 by the Finnish composer Jean Sibelius. It is chronologically the second of Sibelius's nine orchestral cantatas, and belongs to a series of three such pieces—along with the Promotional Cantata of 1894 (JS 105) and the Promotional Cantata of 1894 (JS 106)—that he wrote on commission from his employer at the time, the Imperial Alexander University (today the University of Helsinki). Sibelius composed the cantata in honor of Nicholas II's accession to the Russian throne, because the University, as a state-financed institution, was required to pay its respects to the new sovereign. (At the time, Finland was a grand duchy in the tsar's possession.) The piece premiered on 2 November 1896 during a ceremony in Helsinki, with Sibelius conducting the Helsinki Philharmonic Society and an amateur chorus.

In 1896, Sibelius arranged for orchestra a section of Movement I as the Coronation March (Kröningsmarsch). Finally, in 1913, he arranged a portion of Movement I (bars 115–153) as Hail, O Princess (Terve ruhtinatar), for female choir (or children's choir) a cappella.

== Instrumentation ==
The Coronation Cantata is scored for the following instruments and voices, organized by family (vocalists, woodwinds, brass, percussion, and strings):

- Mixed choir (SATB)
- 1 flute (doubling on piccolo), 1 oboe, 2 clarinets, and 1 bassoon
- 2 horns, 2 trumpets, and 3 trombones
- Bass drum, cymbals, and triangle
- Violins (I and II), violas, cellos, and double basses

== Structure ==
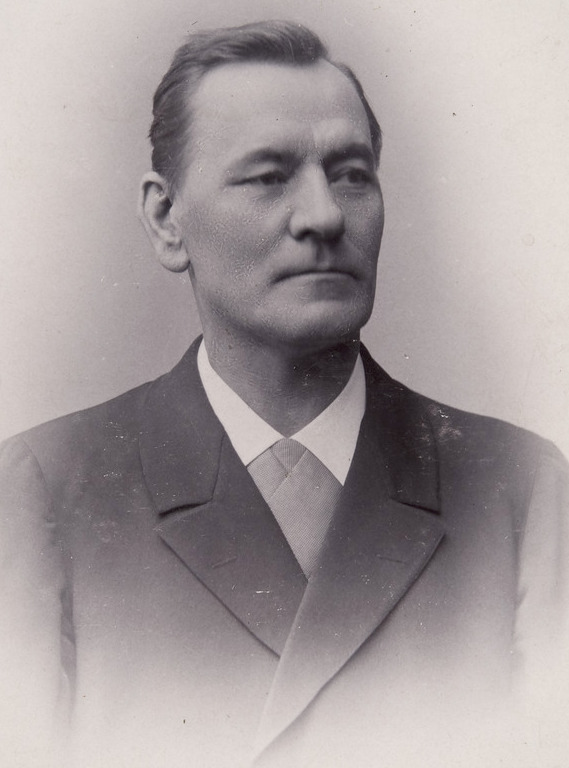
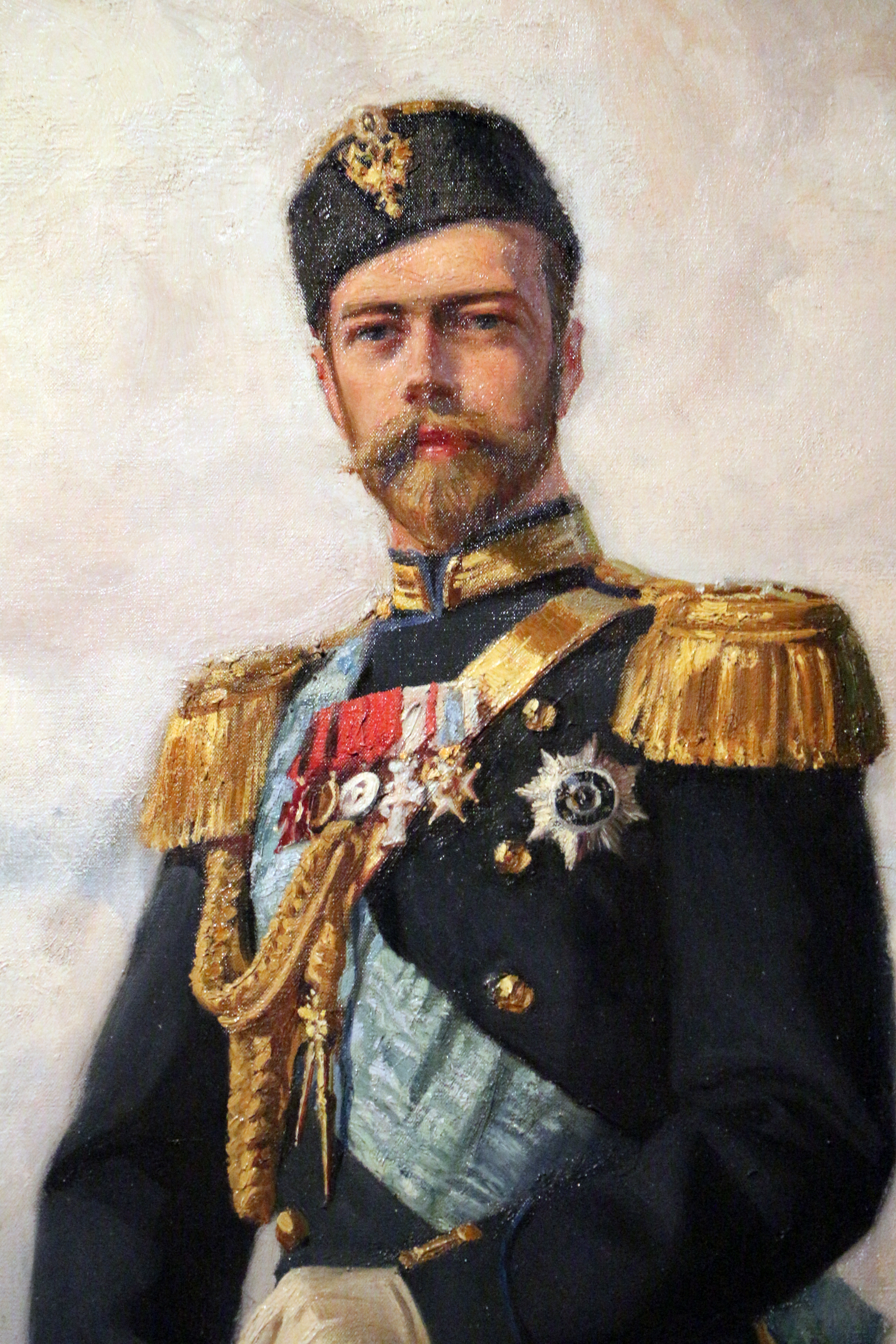
The Finnish author Paavo Cajander (left) wrote the text to Coronation Cantata honoring Nicholas II (right); both he and Sibelius, as Fennomans, likely resented the commission.

The Coronation Cantata is in two movements. They are:

1. Allegro; "Hail, young prince ..." ("Terve nuori ruhtinas ...")
2. Allegro; "In the sure security of justice ..." ("Oikeuden varmassa turvassa ...")

The cantata remains in manuscript, although will eventually be published as part of the Jean Sibelius Works (JSW) critical edition, an ongoing collaborative project between the National Library of Finland, Breitkopf & Härtel, and the Sibelius Society of Finland. (Begun in 1996, the series is projected at 52 volumes and will eventually cover all of Sibelius's completed original compositions and arrangements, including relevant JS-designated works.)

== Discography ==
The Finnish conductor Leif Segerstam and the Helsinki Philharmonic Orchestra, joined by the Finnish Philharmonic Choir, made the world premiere studio recording of the Coronation Cantata in April 1999 for Ondine. The table below lists this and other commercially available recordings:

No.	Conductor	Orchestra	Chorus	Rec. (Note: Refers to the year in which the performers recorded the work; this may not be the same as the year in which the recording was first released to the general public.)	Time (Note: All runtimes are official, as printed on CD or LP liner notes.)	Venue	Label	Ref.
1	Leif Segerstam	Helsinki Philharmonic Orchestra	Finnish Philharmonic Choir	1999	17:13	Finlandia Hall	Ondine	(Note: L. Segerstam—Ondine (ODE 936–2) 1999)
2	Osmo Vänskä	Lahti Symphony Orchestra	Jubilate Choir	2001	18:37	Sibelius Hall	BIS	(Note: O. Vänskä—BIS (CD–1265) 2004)

In addition, the Finnish choral director Hannu Norjanen and the Tapiola Chamber Choir made the world premiere studio recording of the Hail, O Princess for female choir a cappella c. 1997 for Finlandia. The table below lists this and other commercially available recordings:

No.	Choral director	Ensemble	Runtime	Rec.	Recording venue	Label	Ref.
1	Hannu Norjanen	Tapiola Chamber Choir	0:49	1997	Roihuvuori Church	Finlandia	(Note: Tapiola Chamber Choir—Finlandia (0630–19054–2) 1998)
2	Astrid Riska	Jubilate Choir	0:48	1998	Tapiola Hall	BIS	(Note: Jubilate Choir—BIS (CD–998) 1999)
3	Seppo Murto	Dominante Choir	1:18	2010	New Pavilon, Kauniainen	BIS	(Note: Dominante Choir—BIS (CD–1889) 2012)
4	Heikki Seppanen	Estonian Philharmonic Chamber Choir	0:50	2014	Järvenpää Hall	Ondine	(Note: Estonian Phil. Chamber Choir—Ondine (ODE 1260–2D) 2015)

Finally, the Finnish conductor Osmo Vänskä and the Lahti Symphony Orchestra made the world premiere studio recording (and, to date, only) of the Coronation March in January 2002 for BIS. The table below contains additional details about this recording:

No.	Conductor	Orchestra	Runtime	Rec.	Recording venue	Label	Ref.
1	Osmo Vänskä	Lahti Symphony Orchestra	2002	2:10	Sibelius Hall	BIS	(Note: O. Vänskä—BIS (CD–1445) 2003)

== Notes, references, and sources ==
Notes

Sources

- "The critical edition: Jean Sibelius Works". sibeliussociety.fi. Sibelius Society of Finland.
- Barnett, Andrew (2007). Sibelius. New Haven: Yale University Press. ISBN 978-0-300-11159-0.
- Dahlström, Fabian [in Swedish] (2003). Jean Sibelius: Thematisch-bibliographisches Verzeichnis seiner Werke [Jean Sibelius: A Thematic Bibliographic Index of His Works] (in German). Wiesbaden: Breitkopf & Härtel. ISBN 3-7651-0333-0.
- Tiilikainen, Jukka; Salmenhaara, Erkki (1999). Sibelius: Cantata for the Concerment Ceremony of 1894 / Coronation Cantata / Academic March / Andante festivo / Finlandia (booklet). Translated by Hallberg-Rautalin, Irma. Leif Segerstam, Helsinki Philharmonic Orchestra, & Finnish Philharmonic Choir. Ondine. ODE 936-2.
