= Kiitos ei ole kirosana =

Studio album by Haloo Helsinki!
- Released: 3 October 2014
- Genre: Pop rock
- Length: 46:28
- Language: Finnish
- Label: Ratas Music

Haloo Helsinki! chronology
Maailma on tehty meitä varten (2013)	Kiitos ei ole kirosana (2014)

Singles from Kiitos ei ole kirosana
- 1. "Beibi" Released: 15 August 2014; 2. "Vihaan kyllästynyt" Released: October 2, 2014; 3. "Kiitos ei ole kirosana" Released: January 30, 2015; 4. "Kuussa tuulee" Released: April 13, 2015; 5. "Pulp Fiction" Released: June 12, 2015

Kiitos ei ole kirosana is the fifth studio album of the Finnish pop rock band Haloo Helsinki!. It was released on 3 October 2014 by Sony Music Entertainment. The album debuted at number one on the Finnish Albums Chart.

== Track listing ==
Standard edition
No.	Title	Length
1.	"Köpis 2012 (Copenhagen 2012)"	3:52
2.	"Beibi (Baby)"	4:10
3.	"Nainen jonka ympärille tuolit tuodaan (Woman that is surrounded by chairs)"	4:22
4.	"Kiitos ei ole kirosana (Thank you isn't a swear word)"	4:00
5.	"Vihaan kyllästynyt (Fed up with anger)"	4:42
6.	"Kuussa tuulee (It's windy in the moon)"	4:05
7.	"Pulp Fiction"	4:14
8.	"Ihmisen kuvat (Pictures of humans)"	4:25
9.	"Kevyempi kantaa (Easier To Carry)"	4:36
10.	"Teräslinnut (Steel Birds)"	4:15
11.	"Go Saimaa"	3:47

== Charts ==
Chart (2014)	Peak position
Finnish Albums (Suomen virallinen lista)	1

== See also ==
- List of number-one albums of 2014 (Finland)
