= Amici Cantus =

Finnish choir

The male voice choir Amici Cantus was founded in 1983 in Helsinki, Finland. The choir's repertoire contains both sacred and secular music, with main emphasis on Finnish music. Amici Cantus has recorded a collection of male choir songs from both Leevi Madetoja (1987) and Selim Palmgren (1990), and has also put out a complete collection of Einojuhani Rautavaara’s unaccompanied male choir repertoire (1997). In 2001, the choir published the complete male choir repertoire of Nils-Eric Fougstedt and in 2013, the complete a cappella male choir work of Toivo Kuula. In the fall of 2015, the choir made Finnish cultural history by making the premiere recording of the complete (if small) male choir output of Ernst Mielck for the Finnish Broadcasting Company.

== Conductors ==
- Sakari Hildén (1983–1987)
- Juha Korkeamäki (1987–1988)
- Johanna Kallio (1988–1990)
- Hannu Norjanen (1990–1997)
- Keimo Joensuu (1990–1992)
- Märt Krell (1997)
- Kari Kaarna (1998–1999)
- Teppo Lampela (2000)
- Esko Kallio (2001–2003)
- Taru Muranen (2013-)

== Discography ==
- ACLP-87, ACCD-90 (1-CD), in 1987 with conductor Sakari Hildén (songs by composers Leevi Madetoja, Darius Milhaud, Francis Poulenc, Einojuhani Rautavaara, and Arvo Pärt).
- ACCD-91 (1-CD), in 1991 with conductor Hannu Norjanen ("Selim Palmgren, Lauluja mieskuorolle/Songs for a male choir")
- ACCD-95 (maxi-CD), in 1995 with conductor Hannu Norjanen and solo singer Jore Marjaranta ("Silent Night")
- Finlandia Records, 3984-21444-2 (2-CD), in 1998 with conductor Hannu Norjanen ("Einojuhani Rautavaara, Elämän kirja/Book of Life, Mieskuorolaulut/Complete songs for male voice choir")
- Fuga Records, FUGA-9148 (2-CD), in 2001 with conductor Kari Kaarna ("Nils-Eric Fougstedt, Sjunger i stilla kvällar, Mieskuorolaulut/Complete male choir works")
- Fuga Records, FUGA-9350 (1-CD), released 21 March 2013, with conductor Hannu Norjanen and soloist Sauli Tiilikainen ("Kesän mentyä, Toivo Kuula, Complete Male Choir Works a cappella")
