= Cantores minores =

Cantores Minores
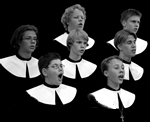

Background information
- Origin: Helsinki, Finland
- Genres: Classical music
- Years active: 1952 - Present

Cantores Minores is a choir of the Helsinki Cathedral, and Finland's oldest and most successful boys' choir. The patron of the choir is the President of Finland. The choir consists of around four hundred 4- to 25-year-old boys and young men.

== History ==
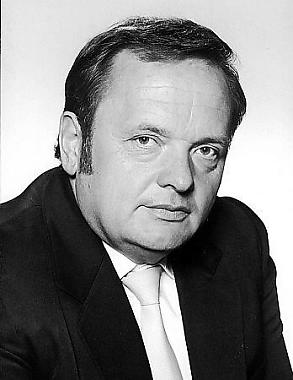
Professor Christian Hauschild directed Cantores Minores from 1987 to 2004.

The choir was founded in 1952 by Tarmo Nuotio and Ruth Ester Hillilä. Since then, the choir has also established several smaller groups. The choir's long-term conductors include Austrian Peter Lacovich, who acted as choir's leader from 1954 to 1958 and 1960 to 1962, and German Heinz Hofmann (1919-1987), who directed the choir from 1962 until his death in 1987.

From 1987 to 2004, the choir, along with the Cantores Minores Musical Institute established in 1990, were led by the German Professor Christian Hauschild. During his time the repertoire of the choir expanded and its reputation abroad grew due to long concert tours around the globe. The choral repertoire is well represented by the performances in 2004, when the major pieces included Bach's St John Passion, St Matthew Passion, Christmas Oratorio (cantatas 1-3), Mozart's Requiem and Brahms's Ein deutsches Requiem.

Hannu Norjanen has been the choir's artistic leader since 2005, and sang in Cantores Minores as a boy. He graduated as conductor from the Sibelius Academy.

== Chorus ==
The performing choir comprises ca. 140 8-to-25-year-old boys and men. The assembly of the choir is SSAATTBB (1st and 2nd soprano, 1st and 2nd alto, 1st and 2nd tenor, 1st and 2nd bass). After puberty, boys proceed from boy voices to male voices. Each voice has its own prefect, who is the "leader" of his voice and is responsible for keeping order. The prefect is the position of trust appointed by conductor of the choir. The choir actively practices several times a week and give concerts both at home and abroad.

The choir operates in connection with training groups named B-, Choral- and Cappellachoir, which prepare 7- to 12-year-old boys to perform in the main chorus (A-Choir). CM-Music Institute also runs musical kindergartens for 4-to-7-year-old boys in the Helsinki metropolitan area. Boys may also choose to have classical singing, piano and flute lessons, as well as education in music theory.

== Repertoire ==
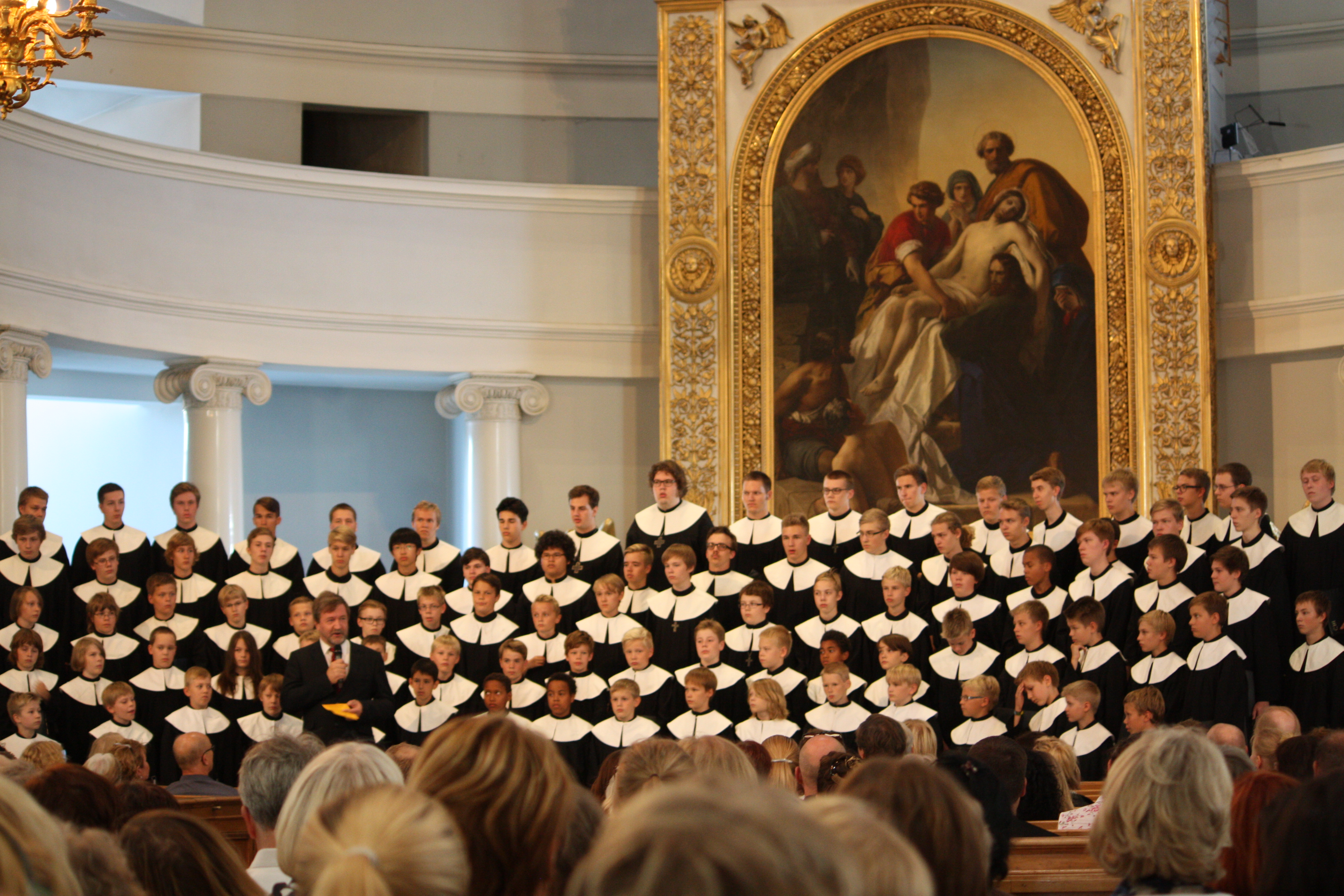
Cantores Minores in Helsinki Cathedral, 2013.

Cantores Minores' permanent repertoire includes, inter alia, Johann Sebastian Bach's major works: St Matthew Passion and St John Passion, (which sets out in alternate years), Christmas Oratorio, and Mass in B Minor, as well as the composer's motets. Other notable major works are the requiems of Brahms and Mozart. The choir's a cappella program is a cross-section of the entire history of classical choral music, ranging from Orlando di Lasso to Olli Kortekangas. Finnish choral music is strongly represented in their repertoire, with songs from composers including Einojuhani Rautavaara, Jukka Linkola, Joonas Kokkonen and Leevi Madetoja. During the Christmas season, the choir sings traditional Christmas carols at their concerts.

== Small Groups ==
From the main choir of Cantores Minores, several small bands have arisen, such as "CM Vocal" (SATB) and "CM Swing", as well as Christmas CM-Star Boys' Singing (SATB and SA, TB). Some of these groups also have lighter a cappella program ranging all the way to popular music. CM-boys continues to perform for private occasions such as weddings and funerals, corporate conferences, and other events.

== Choir directors ==
- 1952-1954 Ruth Ester Hillilä
- 1954-1958 Peter Lacovich
- 1959-1960 Harald Andersén
- 1960-1962 Peter Lacovich
- 1962-1987 Heinz Hofmann
- 1987-2004 Christian Hauschild
- 2005 - Hannu Norjanen

== Recordings ==
- Cantores Minores (LP) (1971)
- Jouluyö, juhlayö (LP) (1972)
- Cantores Minores (LP) (1972)
- Joulukertomus (LP) (1986)
- Cantores Minores (LP) (1990)
- In Dulci Jubilo (1993)
- Kaunis ääni Suomesta (1995)
- Jauchzet! (1995)
- Mozart: Coronation Mass (1996, recorded live in 1954)
- Suomelle (1997)
- Puer Natus in Betlehem (2000)
- Joululauluja - Christmas carols (2007)
- Iiro Rantala: Jouluoratorio (2013)
- Haloo Helsinki! - "Joulun kanssas jaa" (2017)
