= Kuule minua =

Single by Haloo Helsinki!

from the album III
- Released: 15 July 2011
- Genre: pop rock
- Length: 4:51
- Label: EMI Finland
- Songwriters: Marko Annala (lyrics); Annala (composition); Elli Haloo, Jere Marttila, Leo Hakanen, Jukka Soldan, Erno Laitinen, Rauli Eskolin (arrangement)

Haloo Helsinki! singles chronology
"Maailman toisella puolen" (2011)	"Kuule minua" (2011)	"Jos mun pokka pettää" (2012)

Music video
- "Kuule minua" on YouTube

"Kuule minua" (English: Hear Me) is a Finnish-language song by Finnish pop rock band Haloo Helsinki!. It was released on 15 July 2011 by EMI Finland as the third single from their third studio album III.

== Track listing ==
No.	Title	Length
1.	"Kuule minua" (Hear me)	51:04

== Charts ==
Chart (2011)	Peak position
Finland (Suomen virallinen lista)	9
