= Haloo Helsinki! (album) =

Studio album by Haloo Helsinki!
- Released: 13 August 2008
- Genre: Pop, rock
- Length: 40:38
- Language: Finnish
- Label: EMI Finland

Haloo Helsinki! chronology
Haloo Helsinki! (2008)	Enemmän kuin elää (2009)

Singles from Haloo Helsinki!
- 1. "Haloo Helsinki!" Released: 31 October 2007; 2. "Perjantaina" Released: 9 April 2008; 3. "Vieri vesi vieri" Released: 23 July 2008

Haloo Helsinki! (Hello, Helsinki!) is the debut studio album by Finnish pop rock band Haloo Helsinki!. It was released by EMI Finland digitally on 13 August 2008. It debuted at number six on the Finnish Albums Chart and charted for seven weeks.

== Track listing ==
Standard edition
No.	Title	Length
1.	"Haloo Helsinki!" (Hello, Helsinki!)	3:30
2.	"Vieri vesi vieri" (Run, Water, Run)	3:11
3.	"Yksinäiset" (The Lonely Ones)	4:00
4.	"Perjantaina (album version)" (On Friday)	3:43
5.	"Silmät kii" (With Our Eyes Closed)	3:46
6.	"Kaaos ei karkaa" (Chaos Is Not Ending)	3:43
7.	"Elävät ja kuolleet" (The Living and the Dead)	3:54
8.	"Rakkauden jälkeen" (After Love)	3:38
9.	"Mua ei oo" (I Don't Exist)	3:58
10.	"Mannerheimintie" (Mannerheim's Street)	3:50
11.	"Melkein sekaisin" (Almost Out of My Mind)	3:25

== Charts ==
Chart (2008)	Peak position
Finnish Albums (Suomen virallinen lista)	6
