= Vapaus käteen jää =

Single by Haloo Helsinki!

from the album Maailma on tehty meitä varten
- Released: 1 February 2013
- Genre: pop rock
- Length: 4:02
- Label: Ratas Music Group
- Songwriters: Elli Haloo (lyrics); Jere Marttila, Rauli Eskolin (composition)

Haloo Helsinki! singles chronology
"Huuda!" (2012)	"Vapaus käteen jää" (2013)	"Beibi" (2014)

Music video
- "Vapaus käteen jää" on YouTube

"Vapaus käteen jää" (English: Freedom Is All You Have Left) is a Finnish-language song by Finnish pop rock band Haloo Helsinki!. It was released on 1 February 2013 by Ratas Music Group as the second single from their platinum-selling fourth studio album Maailma on tehty meitä varten. The song peaked at number one on the Finnish download chart and number two on the Finnish singles chart. According to Turun Sanomat, the single had sold gold by late August 2013, with officially certified sales of 6,000 copies to date.

== Track listing ==
No.	Title	Length
1.	"Vapaus käteen jää" (Freedom Is All You Have Left)	4:02

== Charts and certifications ==
=== Weekly charts ===
Chart (2013)	Peak position
Finland (Suomen virallinen lista)	2

=== Certifications ===
Region	Certification	Certified units/sales
Finland (Musiikkituottajat)	Gold	6,041
