= Huuda! =

Single by Haloo Helsinki!

from the album Maailma on tehty meitä varten
- Released: 30 November 2012
- Genre: pop rock
- Length: 4:02
- Label: Ratas Music Group
- Songwriters: Elli Haloo (lyrics); Haloo, Leo Hakanen, Rauli Eskolinen (composition); Hakanen, Eskolin, Gabi Hakanen (arrangement)

Haloo Helsinki! singles chronology
"Jos mun pokka pettää" (2012)	"Huuda!" (2012)	"Vapaus käteen jää" (2013)

Music video
- "Huuda!" on YouTube

"Huuda!" ("Scream!") is a Finnish-language song by Finnish pop rock band Haloo Helsinki!. It was released on 30 November 2012 by Ratas Music as the lead single from their fourth studio album Maailma on tehty meitä varten.

== Track listing ==
No.	Title	Length
1.	"Huuda!" (Scream!)	4:02

== Charts ==
Charts (2013)	Peak position
Finland (Suomen virallinen lista)	8
