= Enemmän kuin elää =

Studio album by Haloo Helsinki!
- Released: 28 August 2009
- Genre: Pop, rock
- Length: 38:41
- Language: Finnish
- Label: EMI Finland

Haloo Helsinki! chronology
| Haloo Helsinki! (2008) | Enemmän kuin elää (2009) | III (2011) |

Singles from Enemmän kuin elää
- 1. "Jos elämä ois helppoo" Released: 6 May 2009; 2. "Mun sydän sanoo niin" Released: 3 June 2009; 3. "Valherakkaus" Released: 20 November 2009

Enemmän kuin elää (English: More Than to Just Live) is the second studio album by Finnish pop rock band Haloo Helsinki!. It was released by EMI Finland digitally on 28 August 2009.

== Track listing ==
Standard edition
| No. | Title | Length |
|---|---|---|
| 1. | "Linnanmäki palaa" (Linnanmäki Is Burning) | 3:32 |
| 2. | "Ei Eerika pääse taivaaseen" (Eerika Won't Go to Heaven) | 3:45 |
| 3. | "Hukatut miljoonat" (Lost Millions) | 3:26 |
| 4. | "Yksi ilta unohdusta" (One Night of Oblivion) | 3:23 |
| 5. | "Valherakkaus" (Fake Love) | 3:32 |
| 6. | "Eerika" | 3:27 |
| 7. | "Sinisissä valoissa" (In Blue Lights) | 3:14 |
| 8. | "Mun sydän sanoo niin" (My Heart Says So) | 3:44 |
| 9. | "Jos elämä ois helppoo" (If Life Were Easy) | 3:33 |
| 10. | "Toiset lähtee, toiset jää" (The Others Stay, the Others Go) | 7:05 |

== Charts ==
| Chart (2009) | Peak position |
|---|---|
| Finnish Albums (Suomen virallinen lista) | 7 |
