= Jos elämä ois helppoo =

Finnish-language song by Haloo Helsinki!

Single by Haloo Helsinki!

from the album Enemmän kuin elää
- Released: 6 May 2009
- Length: 3:29
- Label: EMI Finland

Haloo Helsinki! singles chronology
"Vieri vesi vieri" (2008)	"Jos elämä ois helppoo" (2009)	"Mun sydän sanoo niin" (2009)

Music video
- "Jos elämä ois helppoo" on YouTube

"Jos elämä ois helppoo" ("If Life Were Easy") is a Finnish-language song by Finnish pop rock band Haloo Helsinki!. It was released on 6 May 2009 by EMI Finland as the lead single from their second studio album Enemmän kuin elää. The song peaked at number 25 on the Official Finnish Download Chart.

== Charts ==
Chart (2009)	Peak position
Finland Download (Latauslista)	25
