= Maailma on tehty meitä varten =

Studio album by Haloo Helsinki!
- Released: 8 February 2013
- Genre: Pop rock
- Length: 46:30
- Language: Finnish
- Label: Ratas Music
- Producer: Gabi Hakanen, Rauli Eskolin

Haloo Helsinki! chronology
Helsingistä maailman toiselle puolen – Parhaat 2007–2012 (2012)	Maailma on tehty meitä varten (2013)	Kiitos ei ole kirosana (2014)

Singles from Maailma on tehty meitä varten
- 1. "Huuda!" Released: 30 November 2012; 2. "Vapaus käteen jää" Released: 1 February 2013; 3. "Maailma on tehty meitä varten" Released: 23 May 2013; 4. "Carpe Diem" Released: 30 September 2013

Maailma on tehty meitä varten is the fourth studio album of the Finnish pop rock band Haloo Helsinki!. It was released on 8 February 2013 by Ratas Music Group. In its first week of release, the album debuted at number two on the Finnish Albums Chart and peaked at number one in its 26th week. The album charted for 69 weeks. In a month from its release, the album had sold gold according to the radio station The Voice and according to Turun Sanomat the album had sold platinum by late August 2013, with officially certified sales of 32,000 copies to date.

== Singles ==
Two singles have been released so far: "Huuda!", released on 30 November 2012, peaked at number eight on the Finnish Singles Chart and the second single "Vapaus käteen jää", released on 1 February 2013, reached number two and had sold gold by late August 2013. The title track was released as a radio-only promotional single on 23 May 2013 and peaked at number 14 on the Finnish Singles Chart.

== Track listing ==
Standard edition
No.	Title	Writer(s)	Length
1.	"Avautumisraita" (Opening Track)	Leo Hakanen, Rauli Eskolin, Elli Haloo	4:21
2.	"Carpe diem"	Hakanen, Haloo	4:10
3.	"Taivaanlaiva" (Skyship)	Haloo	4:06
4.	"Vapaus käteen jää" (Freedom Is All That's Left)	Jere Marttila, Eskolin, Haloo	4:03
5.	"Huuda!" (Shout!)	Haloo, Hakanen, Eskolin	4:02
6.	"Maailma on tehty meitä varten" (The World Has Been Made for Us)	Hakanen, Haloo, J. Mykkänen	4:35
7.	"Hetki on kaunis" (A Moment Is Beautiful)	Haloo, Marttila, Hakanen, Eskolin	3:40
8.	"Lähtövalmiina" (Ready to Go)	Hakanen, Haloo, Mykkänen	5:45
9.	"Rakkaus" (Love)	Hakanen, Haloo	3:58
10.	"Syvälle silmiin" (Deep into the Eyes)	Marttila, Eskolin, Haloo	3:48
11.	"Onneton blondi" (Unhappy Blonde)	Hakanen, Eskolin, Mykkänen	4:12

Bonus tracks for Spotify
No.	Title	Length
15.	"Sun kanssa pakenen"	3:29

Bonus tracks for iTunes
No.	Title	Length
15.	"Lehdet kellastuu"	3:54

== Charts and certifications ==
=== Weekly charts ===
Chart (2013)	Peak position
Finnish Albums (Suomen virallinen lista)	1

=== Certifications ===
Region	Certification	Certified units/sales
Finland (Musiikkituottajat)	Platinum	32,594

== See also ==
- List of number-one albums of 2013 (Finland)
