= Beibi =

Single by Haloo Helsinki!

from the album Kiitos ei ole kirosana
- Released: 15 August 2014
- Genre: pop rock
- Length: 4:10
- Label: Sony Music Entertainment
- Songwriters: Elli Haloo (lyrics); Leo Hakanen, Jere Marttila (composition)

Haloo Helsinki! singles chronology
"Vapaus käteen jää" (2013)	"Beibi" (2014)	"Viihan kyllästynyt" (2014)

Music video
- "Beibi" on YouTube

"Beibi" (English: Baby) is a song by Finnish pop rock band Haloo Helsinki!. It was released on 15 August 2014 by Sony Music Entertainment as the lead single from their upcoming, fifth studio album Kiitos ei ole kirosana. In September 2014, the song peaked at number one on the Official Finnish Singles Chart, Download Chart and Airplay Chart.

== Track listing ==
No.	Title	Length
1.	"Beibi" (Baby)	4:10

== Charts ==
Chart (2013)	Peak position
Finland (Suomen virallinen lista)	1
