= Ei Eerika pääse taivaaseen =

Promotional single by Haloo Helsinki!

from the album Enemmän kuin elää
- Released: 11 August 2013
- Length: 3:45
- Label: EMI Finland

"Ei Eerika pääse taivaaseen" ("Eerika Won't Go to Heaven") is a song recorded by Finnish pop rock band Haloo Helsinki! for their second studio album Enemmän kuin elää (2009). The song was released by EMI Finland as a promotional single for airplay on 11 August 2009 and peaked at number 24 on the Official Finnish Download Chart.

== Charts ==
Chart (2009)	Peak position
Finland Download (Latauslista)	24
