= III (Haloo Helsinki! album) =

Studio album by Haloo Helsinki!
- Released: 25 February 2011
- Genre: Pop, rock
- Length: 42:17
- Language: Finnish
- Label: EMI Finland

Haloo Helsinki! chronology
Enemmän kuin elää (2009)	III (2011)	Helsingistä maailman toiselle puolen – Parhaat 2007–2012 (2012)

Singles from III
- 1. "Kokeile minua" Released: 7 January 2011; 2. "Maailman toisella puolen" Released: 8 April 2011; 3. "Kuule minua" Released: 15 July 2011; 4. "Jos mun pokka pettää" Released: 13 January 2012

III is the third studio album by Finnish pop rock band Haloo Helsinki!. It was released by EMI Finland digitally on 25 February 2011.

== Track listing ==
CM Store edition
No.	Title	Length
1.	"Hyvää matkaa" (Have a Nice Trip)	3:52
2.	"Kuule minua" (Hear Me)	4:51
3.	"Kokeile minua" (Try Me)	3:53
4.	"Miltä nyt tuntuu" (How Does It Feel Now)	3:58
5.	"Jos mun pokka pettää" (If I Can't Keep My Poker Face)	3:31
6.	"Sairastun sinuun" (You Become My Disease)	4:04
7.	"Teidän lapset" (Your Children)	3:55
8.	"Moshpit"	3:20
9.	"Viimeinen maalissa" (The Last One at the Finish Line)	3:34
10.	"Ihan sattumaa" (A Total Coincidence)	3:20
11.	"Maailman toisella puolen" (On the Other Side of the Globe)	3:59

Bonus tracks for iTunes
No.	Title	Length
12.	"Entisessä elämässä" (In the Previous Life)	3:49

== Charts and certifications ==
=== Weekly charts ===
Chart (2011)	Peak position
Finnish Albums (Suomen virallinen lista)	8

=== Year-end charts ===
Chart (2011)	Position
Finnish Albums (Suomen virallinen lista)	50
Chart (2012)	Position
Finnish Albums (Suomen virallinen lista)	45

=== Certifications ===
Region	Certification	Certified units/sales
Finland (Musiikkituottajat)	Platinum	22,264
