= A. V. Koskimies =

Finnish educationalist and linguist

August Valdemar Koskimies (Note: In some sources shown instead as Aukusti and/or Waldemar) (né Forsman until 1906; 7 January 1856, in Pihlajavesi – 5 June 1929, in Helsinki), better known as A. V. Koskimies, was a Finnish educationalist, researcher of language and literature, as well as writer and poet.

Koskimies received a PhD from the University of Helsinki in 1891.

He worked as a secondary school teacher from 1888 till 1926, teaching Latin in Porvoo and Pori, and later for over 30 years lecturing in Finnish and Swedish languages and literature at the Normal Lyceum of Helsinki. He was noted for his pedagogic skills, and later became influential in teacher training.

Alongside his teaching duties, Koskimies carried out extensive research into, and published several notable works on, philology, languages and literature of Finland (including Finnish, Swedish and Sámi).

In 1926, he published a poetry collection titled Vuosien varrella. Many of his poems provide the lyrics to songs by Jean Sibelius, among other composers. He has also written the lyrics to Kymmenen virran maa, the provincial anthem of Lapland and North Ostrobothnia, composed by Oskar Merikanto.

Koskimies was awarded the honorary title of Professori in 1926.
