= Maailma on tehty meitä varten (song) =

Single by Haloo Helsinki!

from the album Maailma on tehty meitä varten
- Released: 23 May 2013
- Length: 4:34
- Label: Ratas Music Group
- Songwriters: Hakanen, Haloo, J. Mykkänen

"Maailma on tehty meitä varten" (English: The World Is Made for Us) is a song recorded by Finnish pop rock band Haloo Helsinki! for their fourth studio album Maailma on tehty meitä varten (2013). The song was released by Ratas Music Group as a promotional single for airplay on 23 May 2013 and has peaked at number 14 on the Finnish Singles Chart and number two on the Official Download Chart.

== Charts ==
Charts (2013)	Peak position
Finland (Suomen virallinen lista)	14
