= Maailman toisella puolen =

Single by Haloo Helsinki!

Single by Haloo Helsinki!

from the album III
- Released: 8 April 2011
- Genre: pop rock
- Length: 3:50
- Label: EMI Finland
- Songwriters: Elli Haloo, Leo Hakanen, Jarmo Mykkänen (lyrics); Hakanen, Rauli Eskolin (composition); Haloo, Jere Marttila, Leo Hakanen, Jukka Soldan, Erno Laitinen, Eskolin (arrangement)

Haloo Helsinki! singles chronology
"Kokeile minua" (2011)	"Maailman toisella puolen" (2011)	"Kuule minua" (2011)

Music video
- "Maailman toisella puolen" on YouTube

"Maailman toisella puolen" (English: On the Other Side of the Globe) is a Finnish-language song by Finnish pop rock band Haloo Helsinki!. Released on 8 April 2011 by EMI Finland as the second single from the band's third studio album III, the song peaked at number three on the Finnish Singles Chart in April 2011 and has sold gold in the country with over 12,000 copies.

== Track listing ==
No.	Title	Length
1.	"Maailman toisella puolen" (On the Other Side of the Globe)	3:50

== Charts and certifications ==
=== Weekly charts ===
Chart (2011)	Peak position
Finland (Suomen virallinen lista)	3

=== Year-end charts ===
Chart (2011)	Position
Finland (Suomen virallinen lista)	5

=== Certifications ===
Region	Certification	Certified units/sales
Finland (Musiikkituottajat)	Platinum	12,226
