= Jos mun pokka pettää =

Single by Haloo Helsinki!

from the album III
- Released: 13 January 2012
- Genre: pop rock
- Length: 3:31
- Label: EMI Music
- Songwriters: Herra Ylppö (lyrics); Erno Laitinen, Rauli Eskolin,

Haloo Helsinki! singles chronology
"Kuule minua" (2011)	"Jos mun pokka pettää" (2012)	"Huuda!" (2012)

Music video
- "Jos mun pokka pettää" on YouTube

"Jos mun pokka pettää" (English: If I Can't Keep My Poker Face) is a Finnish-language song by Finnish pop rock band Haloo Helsinki!. It was released on 13 January 2012 by EMI Music as the fourth and closing single from their third studio album III.

== Track listing ==
No.	Title	Length
1.	"Jos mun pokka pettää" (If I Can't Keep My Poker Face)	3:31

== Charts ==
Chart (2012)	Peak position
Finland (Suomen virallinen lista)	8
