= Monica Groop =

Finnish opera singer

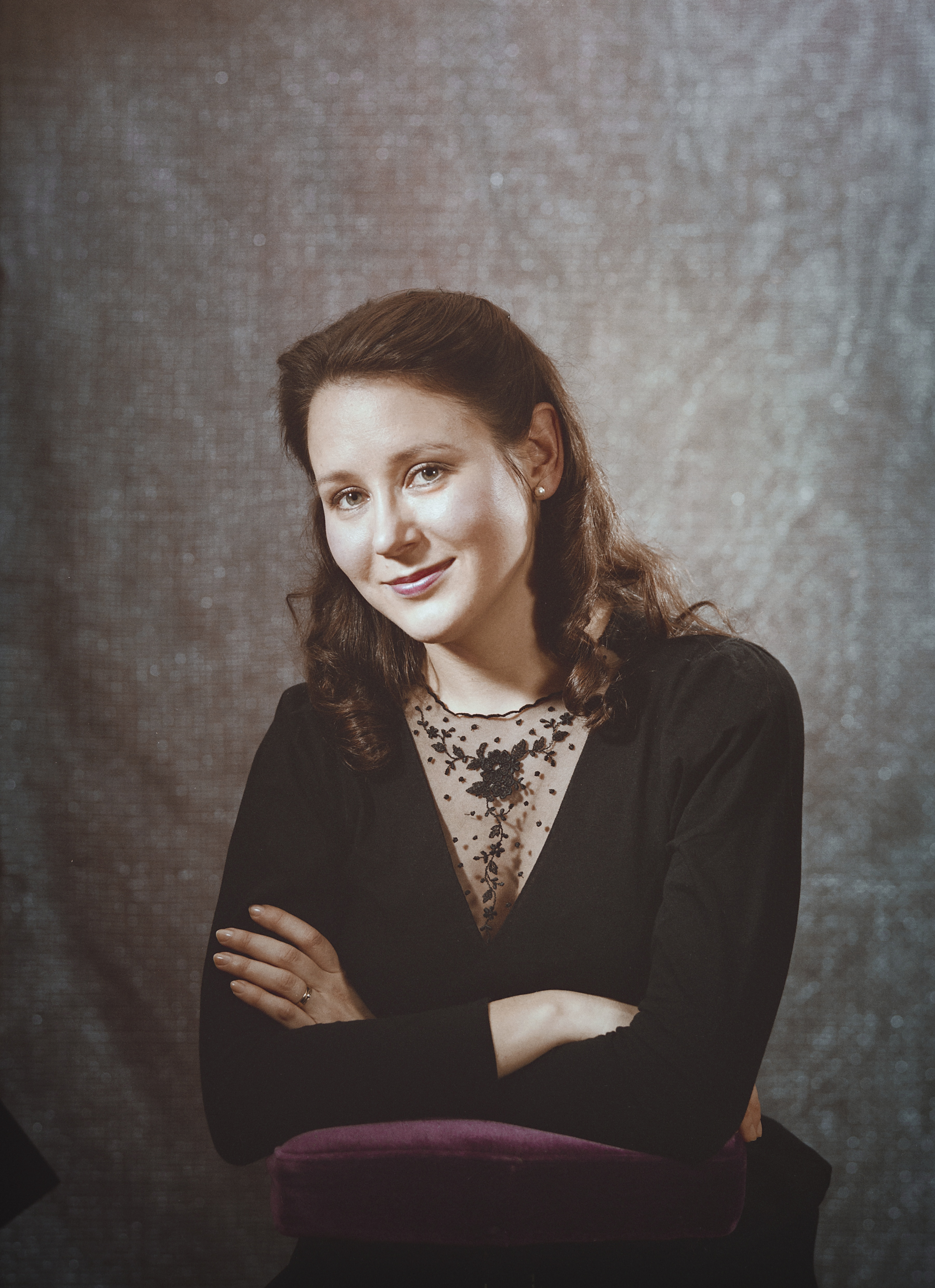
Groop in 1990

Gerd Monica Groop née Riska (born 14 April 1958 in Helsinki) is a Finnish operatic mezzo-soprano. After graduating from the Sibelius Academy, she joined the Finnish National Opera in 1986 where she remains a member. She has sung leading roles as a guest artist with several important theatres internationally, including the Los Angeles Opera, the Palais Garnier, the Royal Opera, London, and the Salzburg Festival to name just a few. She has also recorded the complete songs of Edvard Grieg on BIS Records.

== Memberships ==
Groop is foreign member of the Royal Swedish Academy of Music.
