= Astrid Riska =

Finnish organist

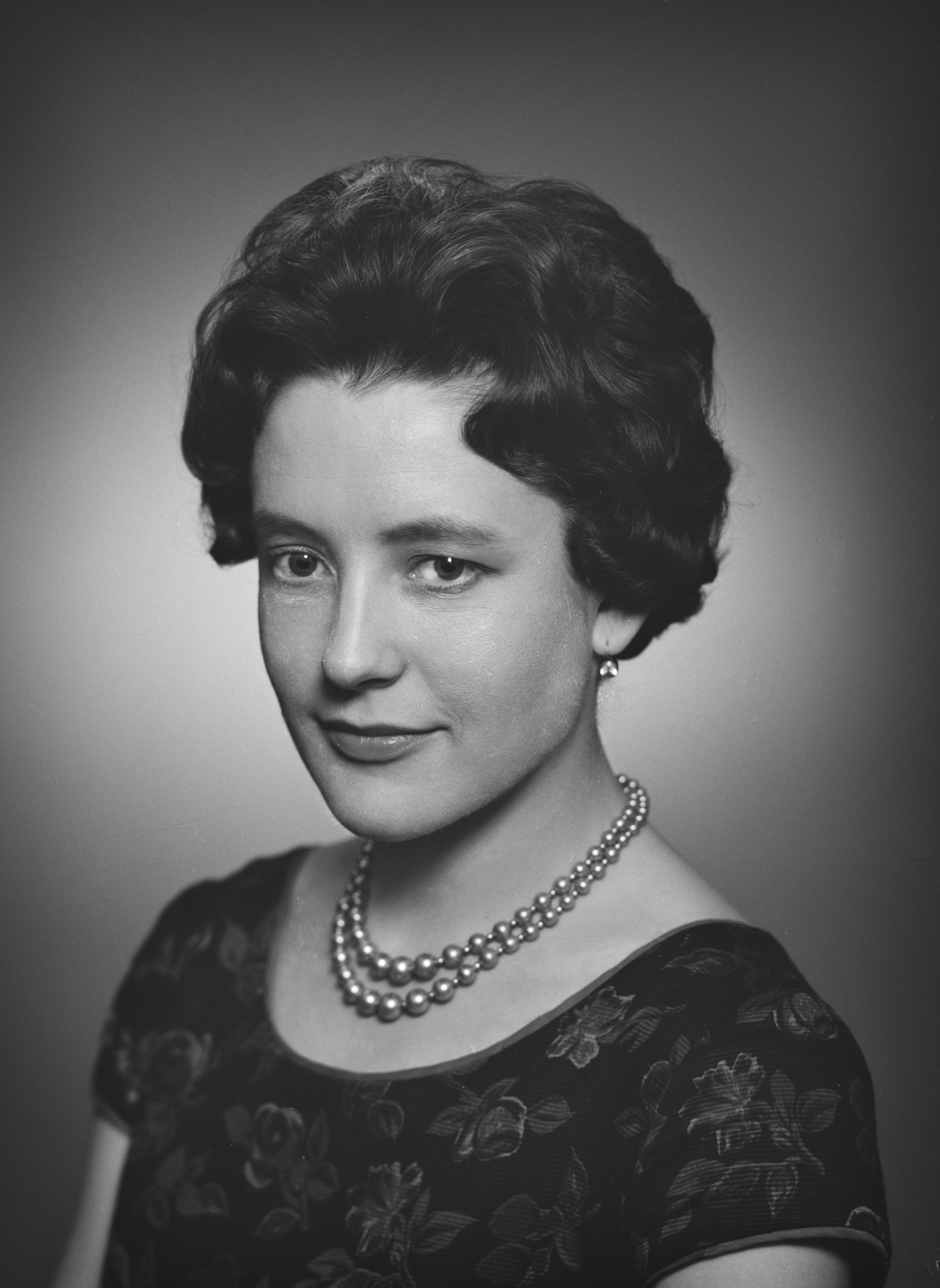
Astrid Riska

Astrid Riska (14 December 1932 – 13 April 2010) was a Finnish organist. She showed interest in children's choirs and voice training.

== Biography ==
Astrid Riska was born as Astrid Linnea Riska née Häggblom on 14 December 1932 in Korsholm, Finland. After completing her training as a primary school teacher, she continued her music studies at the Sibelius Academy. In 1963 she received a diploma in organ playing. She briefly worked as a music teacher in schools, and also taught organ playing at the Sibelius Academy.

In 1967 she founded Jubilate as a children's choir. She has the record of singing at the Finnish Radio Chamber Choir for 25 years. In 1989 she was awarded the Fazer Music Prize for her distinguished service in musical education.

Monica Groop, Finnish opera singer is the daughter of Astrid Riska.

She died in Helsinki on 13 April 2010.
