= Hannu Norjanen =

Hannu-Markus Tapio Norjanen (Mynämäki, 25 February 1964) is a conductor and has worked as the conductor of the Helsinki Cathedral Boy's Choir Cantores Minores since 2005. He is also a part of the Cantores Minores head council. In the years 1990-1997 Norjanen worked as the conductor of the male choir Amici Cantus, and during 2006-2011 as the conductor of Helsinki Philharmonic Choir. In the years 1998-2001 he was the main conductor of the city orchestra of Lappeenranta. Norjanen graduated from the Sibelius Academy as an organist (1990), choir director (1992), and as a conductor in 1997. Norjanen has also been taught by Eric Ericson and studied conducting in Sweden. He was appointed the conductor of the Tapiola Chamber Choir.

Hannu Norjanen has also been as a teacher in the Sibelius-Academy, and has also conducted many operas, for example: Mozart's Magic Flute, Donizetti's L'elisir d'amore, Puccini's La Bohème, Tosca, Verdi's La traviata and Falstaff.
