= Haloo Helsinki! =

Finnish pop rock band

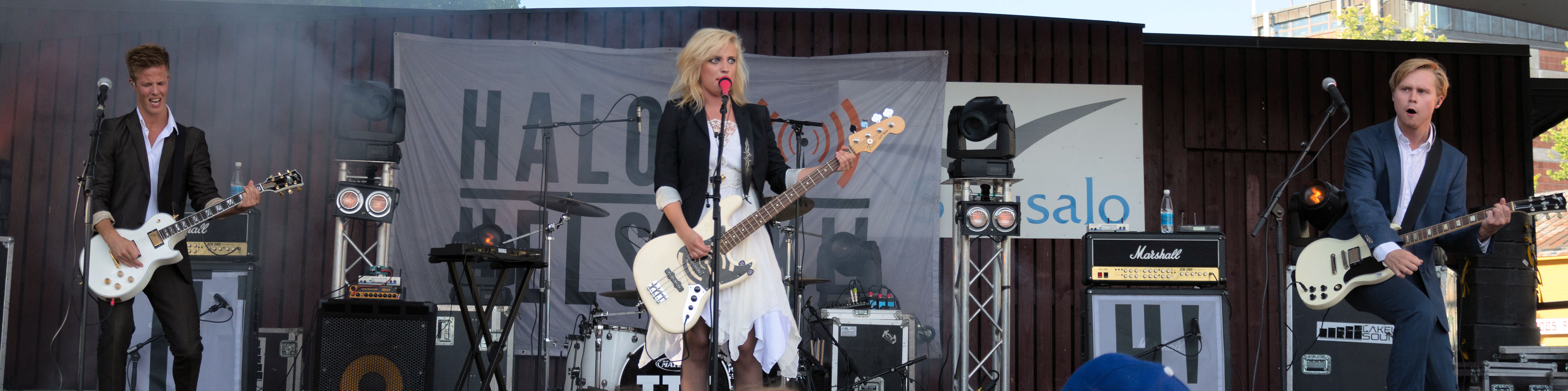

Background information
- Origin: Helsinki, Finland
- Genres: Pop; pop rock; rock
- Years active: 2006–
- Labels: EMI Finland (2007–2011); Ratas Music Group / Sony Music Finland (2012–)
- Members: Elisa Tiilikainen (voice and bass); Jere Marttila (guitar); Leo Hakanen (guitar); Jukka Soldan (drums)
- Website: www.haloohelsinki.fi

Haloo Helsinki! (English: Hello, Helsinki!) is a pop rock band from Finland, founded in 2006. They have released five studio albums, all of which have reached the top ten on the Finnish Albums Chart. From 2007 to 2012, the band were signed to EMI Finland and as their principal collaborators switched to a Sony sub-label, Ratas Music Group, the band followed suit. In 2013, Haloo Helsinki! became the first Finnish artist whose four consecutive singles ("Jos mun pokka pettää", "Huuda!", "Vapaus käteen jää", "Maailma on tehty meitä varten") have peaked at number one on the Chart of commercial Finnish radio stations.

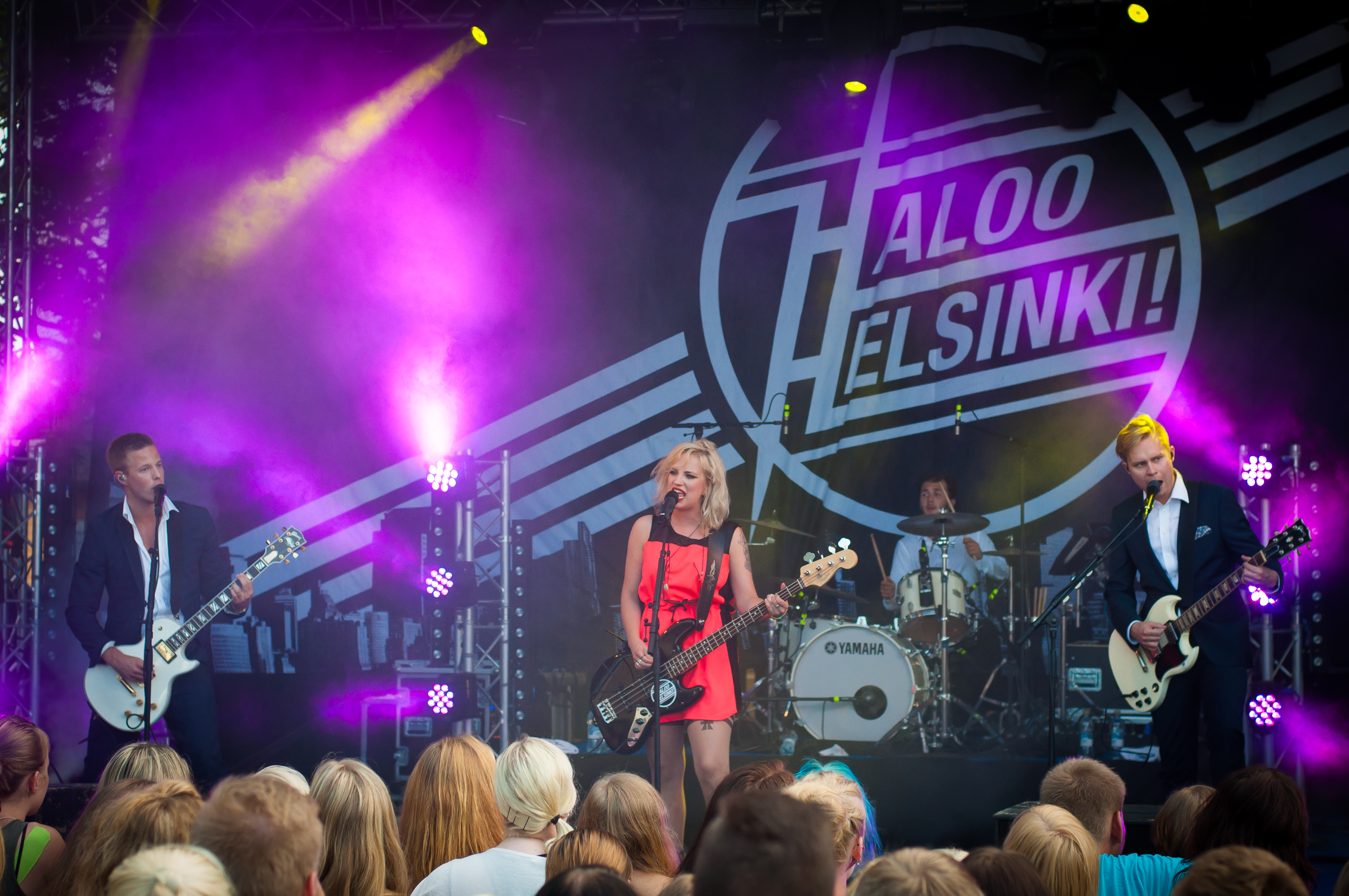
Haloo Helsinki - Rakuuna Rock 2014

== Founding of the band and the EMI years (2006–2011) ==
Guitarist of the band, Leo Hakanen and Jere Marttila have known each other since they went to day care. They both grew up in the Suutarila neighbourhood in northern Helsinki. During the last years of comprehensive school they recruited drummer Jukka Soldan into their band, as they knew that he was the most skillful drummer of the school.

In autumn 2006, Hakanen and Marttila were looking for a new singer for their band. They contacted their future manager Peter Kokljuschkin, who found the singer-bassist Elli (a.k.a. Elisa Tiilikainen, b. 30 July 1990). Elli is from Kallio, but her family background is in Eastern Finland, on the shores of Lake Saimaa.

The first album Haloo Helsinki! was released in August 2008, and it rose to no. 6 in the Finnish album charts. The album stayed on the charts for seven weeks.

In 2009, Haloo Helsinki! performed the YleX official summer rubber song, “Mun sydän sanoo niin” (‘My heart says so’), which was the second single of their second album Enemmän kuin elää (‘More than to be alive’), which was released in September 2009. The album went straight to no. 7 in the Finnish charts and stayed on the chart for four weeks.

The third album, III was released on 2 March 2011. It quickly rose to no 14 on the Finnish charts, and it remained on the charts for 36 weeks, with a peak position of no 8 on week 34/2011. The second single "Maailman toisella puolen" (‘On the other side of the world’) became a hit in the summer of 2011, going to top of the radio charts, and at best it was no. 2 on the download charts no. 3 of the singles chart. The single "Maailman toisella puolen" has sold over 12 000 copies, which qualifies it for a platinum disc.

The album III marked the breakthrough of the band in Finland, and the critics of Helsingin Sanomat and Keskisuomalainen gave it four out of five stars, and Savon Sanomat gave it five stars. The album III has been sold more than 22 000 units, which qualifies it for a platinum disc.

In the autumn of 2011, EMI Music Finland released the singles of the first three albums and three previously unreleased songs as a collection. The band’s co-operation with manager Peter Kokljuschkin ended after the album III.

== Return (2020–present) ==
In October 2020 the band released a single titled "Lady Domina" in advance of their anticipated 2021 return.

In February 2021, the band made their formal return, releasing the single "Piilotan mun kyyneleet". On 20 February 2021, the group made their first live performance in two-and-a-half years at Uuden Musiikin Kilpailu 2021, performing "Piilotan mun kyyneleet" as an interval act.

== Members ==
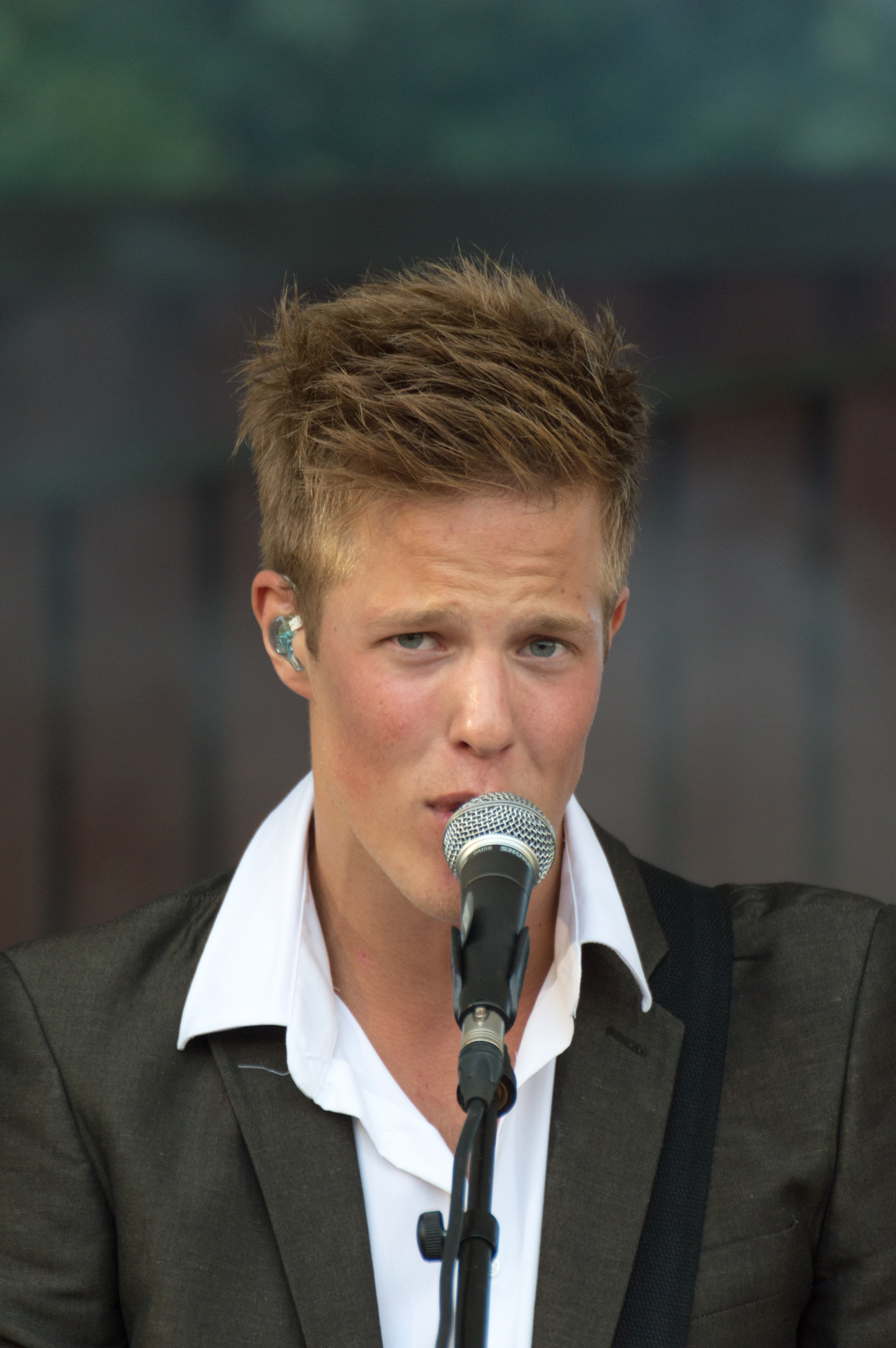
Jere Marttila - guitar, backing vocals

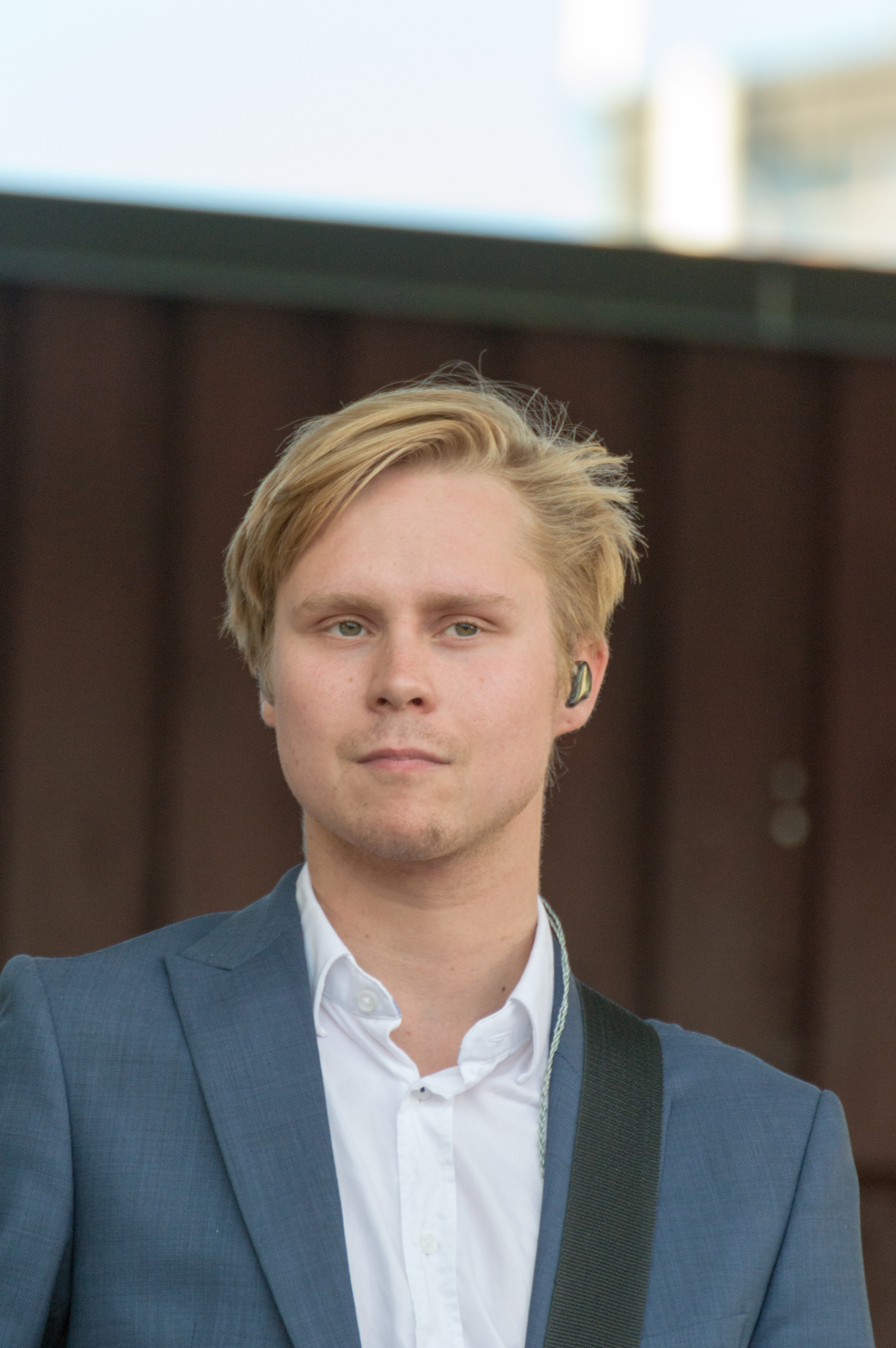
Leo Hakanen - guitar, backing vocals

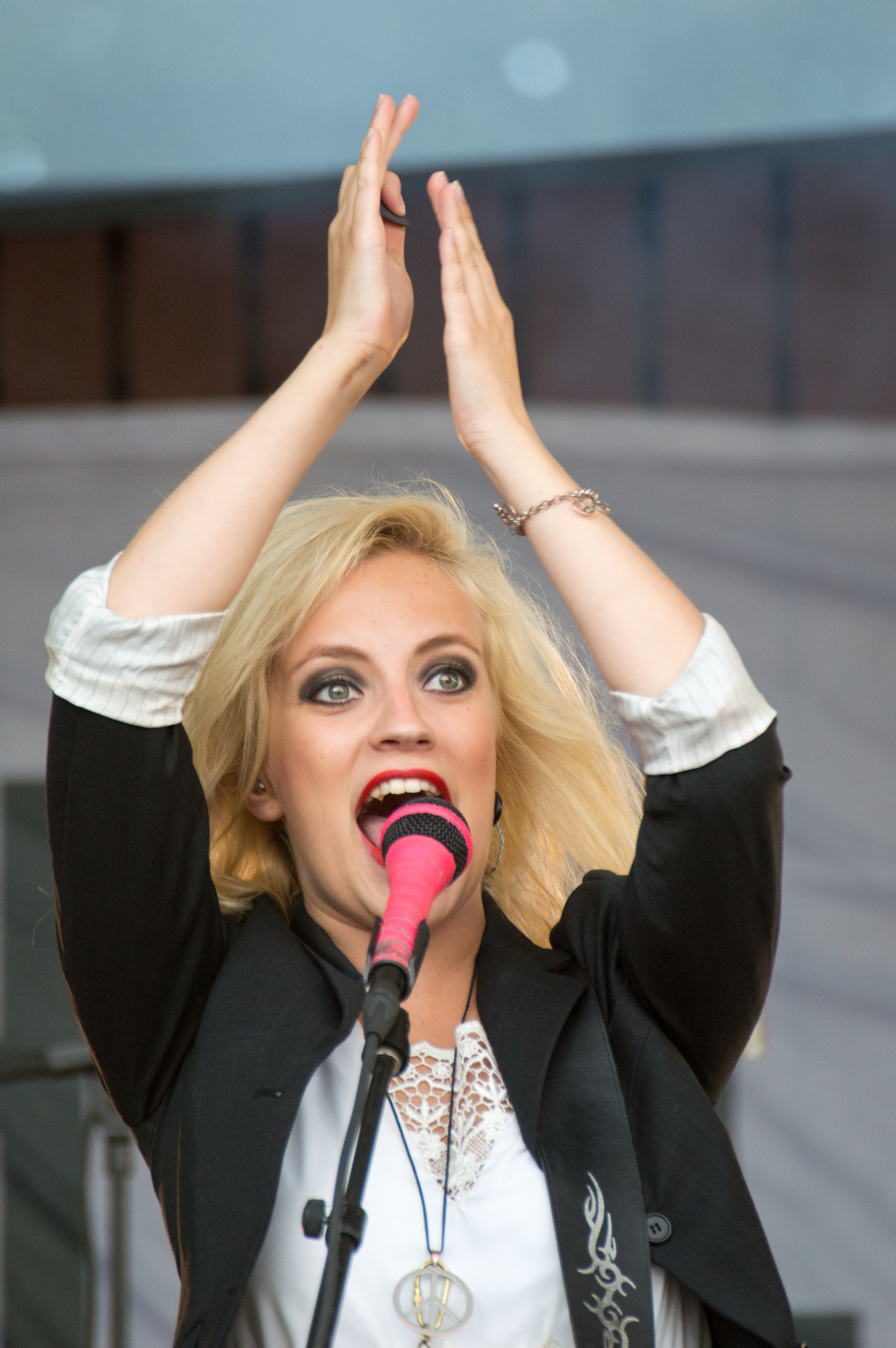
Elli Haloo ( real name Elisa Tiilikainen )- vocals, bass

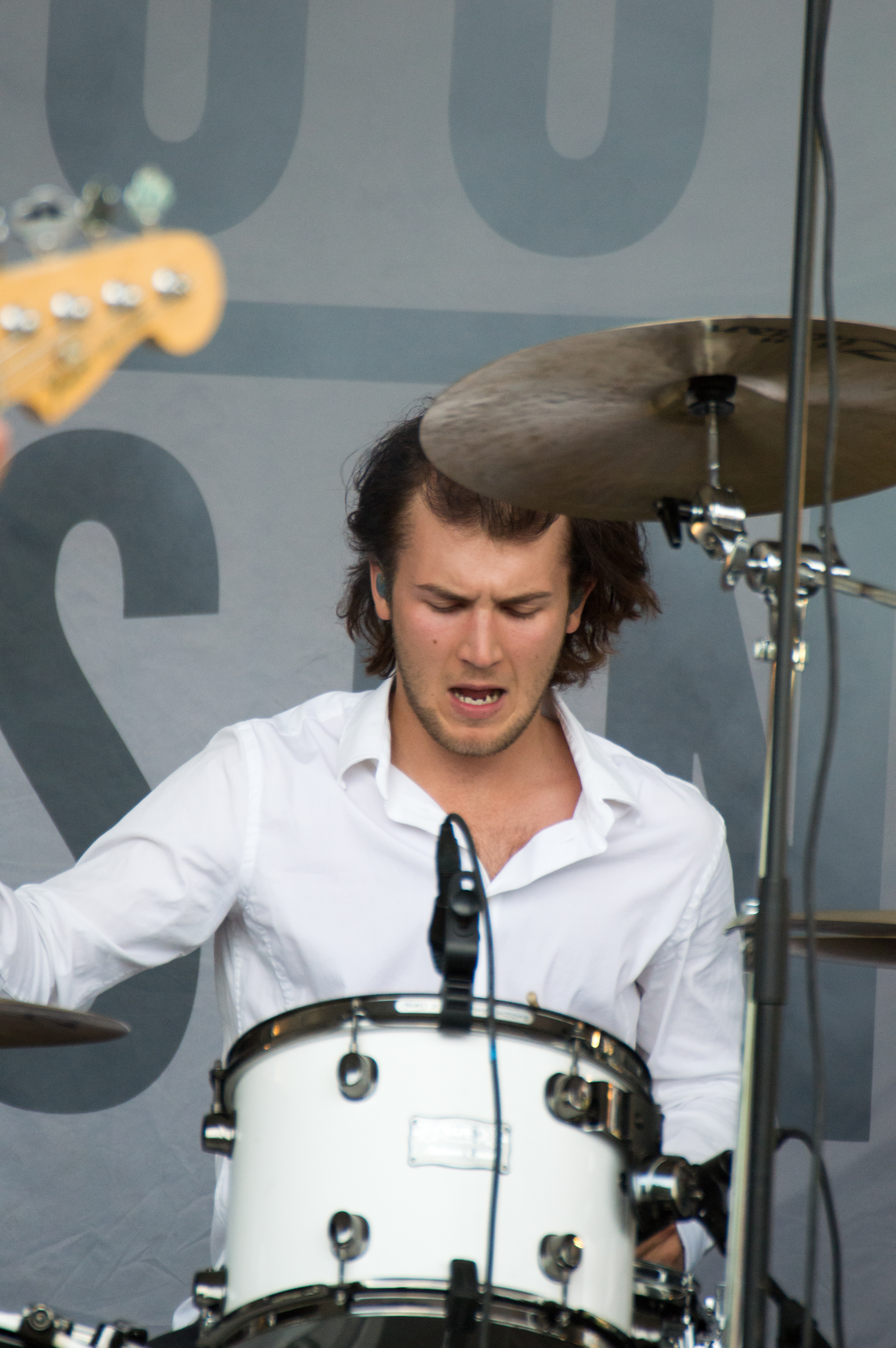
Jukka Soldan - drums

== Discography ==
- Haloo Helsinki! (2008)
- Enemmän kuin elää (2009)
- III (2011)
- Maailma on tehty meitä varten (2013)
- Kiitos ei ole kirosana (2014)
- Hulluuden Highway (2017)
- Älä pelkää elämää (2021)
- Voiko enkelitkin eksyä (2025)
