= Pan-Finnicism =

Pan-nationalist idea of Finno-Ugric unification

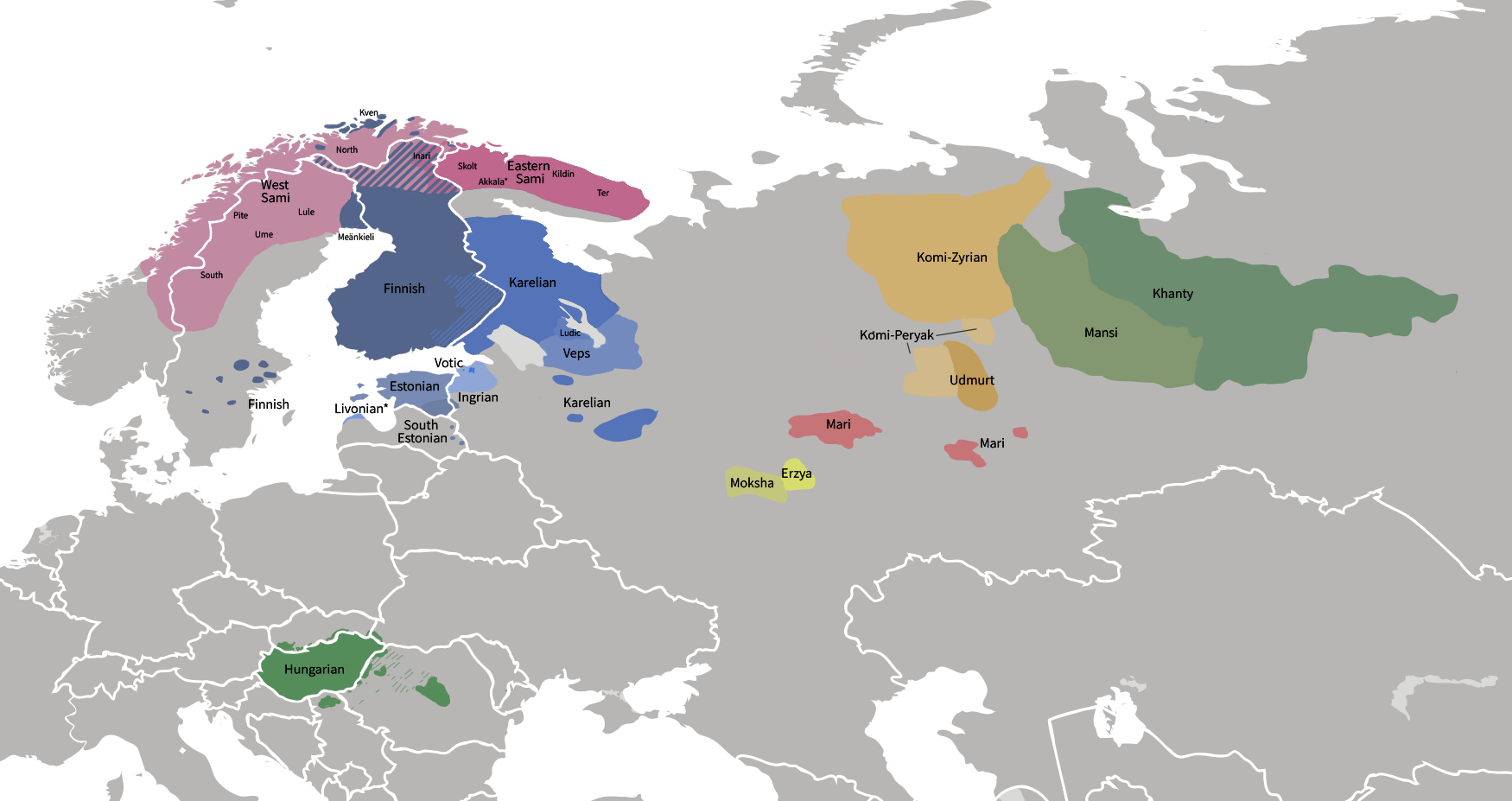
Approximate location of the Finno-Ugric peoples within scope of the ideology

Pan-Finnicism (Finnish: panfennismi), also known as Pan-Fennicism or sometimes even referred to as Finno-Ugrism or even heimoaate (transl. "Kinship Ideology/Thought") is a pan-nationalist idea which advocates for the political or economic unification of the Finno-Ugric peoples. The idea is broad in its meaning and oftentimes it simply refers to the Finno-Ugric peoples, however on rare occasion it can be limited to only the Baltic Finnic peoples or to the Finnic peoples.

== History ==
=== Origins ===
Pan-Finnicism was not an idea taken seriously until the formation of the Grand Duchy of Finland, and even with this sense of autonomy within the wider Russian Empire. Due to hundreds of years of Finland having been under Swedish Rule, a sense of Finnish identity was minor, even with the release of the Kalevala. Zacharias Topelius published an essay called “Den Finska Literaturen och dess Framtid" (transl. The Finnish Literature and Its Future) in 1844 where he states the following:

Two hundred years ago few would have believed that the Slavic tribe would attain the prominent (and constantly growing) position it enjoys nowadays in the history of culture. What if one day the Finnish tribe, which occupies a territory almost as vast, were to play a greater role on the world scene than one could expect nowadays? […] Today people speak of Pan-Slavism; one day they may talk of Pan-Fennicism, or Pan-Suomism. Within such a Pan-Finnic community, the Finnish nation should hold the leading position because of its cultural seniority […].

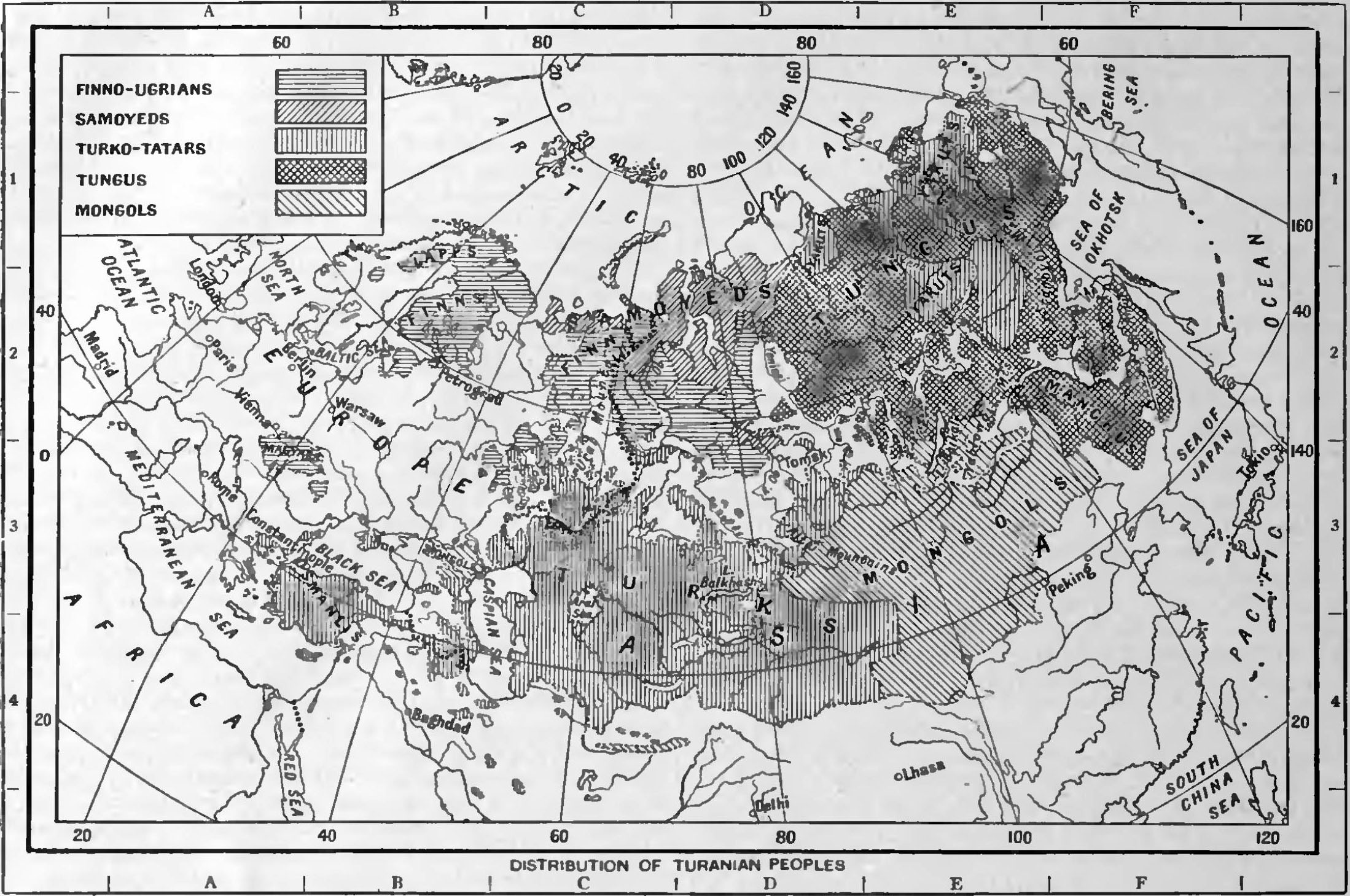
Distribution of Turanian (Turanic) peoples.

Within Pan-Fennicism, the idea that the Finns would hold superiority within such a union was not contested in Finland, as the idea that the Finns qualified as civilizers and awakeners within the Finno-Ugric community was not new, due to its aforementioned seniority. However, the Pan-Finnic Idea was often overlooked by the idea of Pan-Turanism, which was gaining ever more traction in the field of nationalist studies in academies in Finland. The field of studies on the Finno-Ugric peoples and their linguistic and cultural studies during these times often had a severe lack of Finnish scholars, due to a quite common consensus and hopes of many Finnish nationalists for the Finns and the Finno-Ugric peoples to not just be tribal people from nowhere, instead to showcase that the Finno-Ugric peoples and the larger Finno-Ugric family is a part of 'more respected cultures' and a civilizational affiliation. This led to Turanism becoming the mainstream in the Fennoman movement, and Arthur Castrén, who was a prominent fennomanist, believed that based on his research, the Finno-Ugric, Turkic, Mongolian and Tungusic languages were all of the same origins and family. He concluded that the Finns and their other ethnic relatives were from Central Asia, and were far from being a small, isolated people from the middle of nowhere:

I am determined to show the Finnish nation that we are not a solitary people from the bog, living in isolation from the world and from universal history, but are in fact related to at least one-sixth of mankind. Writing grammars is not my main goal, but without the grammars that goal cannot be attained.

Percentage of people speaking Uralic languages in the Russian Empire (1897)

August Ahlqvist, a close coworker of Castrén was of the opinion that the Finns were the perceived superior peoples within the Finno-Ugric family, due to the apparently more present fact of the Finns being more civilized than other Finno-Ugric peoples, however Ahlqvist's attitude had changed following research expeditions to the Volga, East Karelia and Siberia, he had become a suecophile, or at least an admirer of the Scandinavians for their bringing of Christianity and apparent civilization to the Finnish people. He changed his views to that of gratefulness towards the Swedes, and viewed the Finns as being privileged rather than explicitly superior. Ahlqvist's new opinions were proven controversial, and following a speech where he thanked the Swedes for saving the Finnish nation from the same fate as of that of the Finnic relative ethnic groups in Russia and said that the Finns owed a "debt of gratitude", this speech was antagonized much of the Fennoman milieu. Ahlqvist published the Suomen valta poem in 1860, in which Ahlqvist promoted the Greater Finland idea, advocating for the Finnish borders to expand, writing as follows; "Äänisjärvi, Pohjanlahti / Auranrantat, Vienansuu, / there is, Finnish, power / which is no one else's".

The developments of Pan-Finnicism were popular in Finland to an extent, however in other more literate regions such as Hungary, where ideas about being related to the ancient Scythians and other Turkic ideas about the Hungarian ethnic make-up were being formed due to their cultural isolation, the influence of the Turanian society and the perceived threat of Pan-Slavism which was promoted by the Russian Empire. Castrén says about the Hungarian reaction to Pan-Finnic ideas:

This is hardly surprising, for the idea of being related to the Lapps and the Samoyeds stirs us up, too. That same feeling—the commendable desire to have distinguished and splendid ancestors—has driven some of our scholars to seek our cradle in Greece or in the Holy Land. We must, however, give up all possible kinship with the Hellenes, with the ten tribes of Israel, with great and privileged nations in general, and console ourselves with the notion that “everyone is heir to his own deeds” and that real nobility has to be achieved with one's own skill. Whether the Finnish nation will manage to make itself a name in history is uncertain; what is certain is that the generations to come will judge us by our own achievements and not by those of our ancestors.

Estonia and many other regions with people considered to be Finno-Ugric peoples did not have much support or research into the idea of Pan-Fennicism, with Estonia adopting Pan-Finnicism much later on in the 20th century when many Finns had already embraced it in the 1800s. However Estonian colleagues largely adopted the Fennocentric perspective, that of the idea held by many Finns who viewed themselves and the Finnish nation as instrumental for the ideology to even exist and function at a basic level, therefore the Estonians acknowledging their own position within the Finno-Ugric world as secondary to Finland.

In Russian Karelia, Pan-Finnicism began to gain traction at the beginning of the 19th century, especially through various Lutheran missions into the region, and through organizations such as the Viena Karelian Association in 1906, which sought for Finland to annex East Karelia. The Russian Empire, specifically the Arkhangelsk Governorate began to react poorly to what they deemed harmful foreign influence, in Summer 1908, the Governor of Arkhangelsk, Ivan Vasilyevich Sosnovsky deemed that the effect of Pan-Finnicism was minimal, however still urged for the Russification of White Karelia, by building Russian-language educational facilities.

During the First World War, the German Empire had trained Jaegers, which were a part of the Jäger Movement, these Jaegers sought to annex Eastern Karelia into Finland. The Jäger Movement was highly influential within the society of White Finland, and was a key proponent of waging war against Bolshevik Russia, during the Russian Civil War.

=== Pan-Finnicism during the Interwar period and during World War II in Finland, Karelia, Estonia & Hungary ===
Following the achievement of the independence of Finland, there was a wave of nationalistic fervor. During the Heimosodat, various independent volunteers and men from the White Guard fought across the "Finno-Ugric World" in hopes uniting the countries into one or liberating many of them, examples of this were the Kirjasalo Republic and the Karelian United Government, which were de facto satellite states ruled by Finland. Organizations and political parties that supported Pan-Finnicism held a meeting in the New Student House, Helsinki, this meeting was organized by the Karjalan Kansalaisliitto (transl. Citizens' Association of Karelia), and was held in October 1919. The growth of Pan-Finnicism in Finnish society gave rise to such organizations as the Academic Karelia Society and the Patriotic People's Movement. National Tribal Day became a public national holiday in 1931, to celebrate the various Finnic tribes on the third Saturday of October.

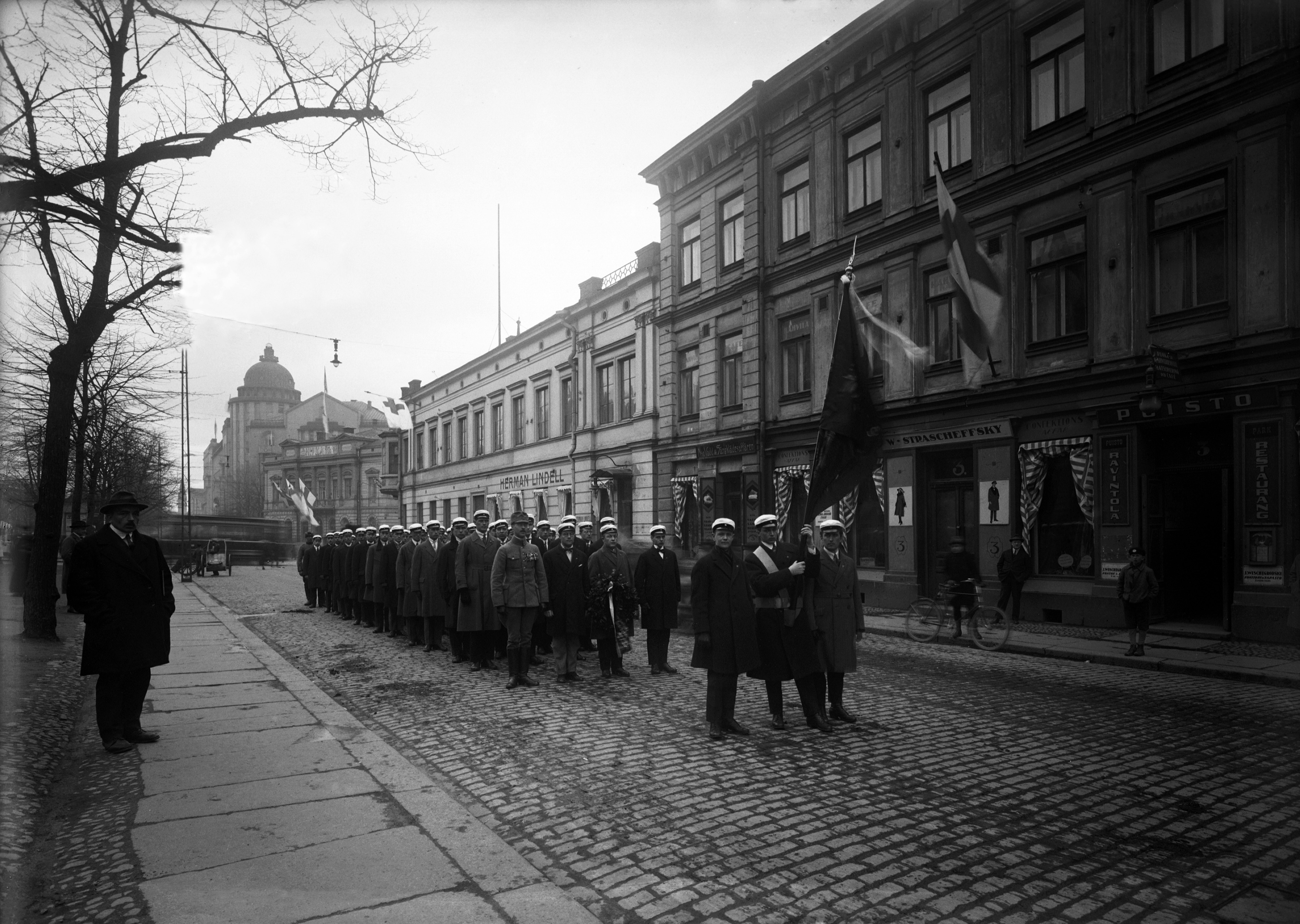
The Academic Karelia Society at Mannerheimintie in Helsinki, Finland

During the Winter War and Continuation War, Pan-Finnicism was at an all-time high and an off-set or form of Pan-Finnicism called the Greater Finland idea gained immense traction, with many Finnic people from across Europe joining to fight for Finland, this includes various Estonian and Ingrian Finnish volunteers, amongst others. Pan-Finnicism was also a major policy within the Eastern Karelian Military Administration until 1943, where Finno-Ugric peoples were set to a higher standard than the East Slavs, who were sent to camps, leading to an alleged genocide according to the Russian Federation.

In East Karelia, with the East Karelian uprising due to rising food shortages, growing nationalism and lack of respect for cultural autonomy by Bolshevik Russia, cultivated into the rise of various nationalistic and Pan-Finnic militias and paramilitary units being established, both in Karelia and Finland, most famously the Metsäsissit (Forest Guerillas). Even following the Red Army having capitulated the Karelians, Pan-Fennicism did not die out in Soviet Karelia, as there was always hopes, at least within the Red Finns who migrated to Soviet Karelia, many of whom were put into positions of power, such as with people like Edvard Gylling, who were accused of Pan-Fennicist ideas and chauvinism by the Soviet officials, to unite Soviet Karelia with Finland and to restore the FSWR. Pan-Fennicism, and its sub-ideology, the Greater Finland idea were now supported by many Karelian people following the Finnish Invasion of East Karelia due to their liberation from the Soviet Union and their new ability to use their language more.

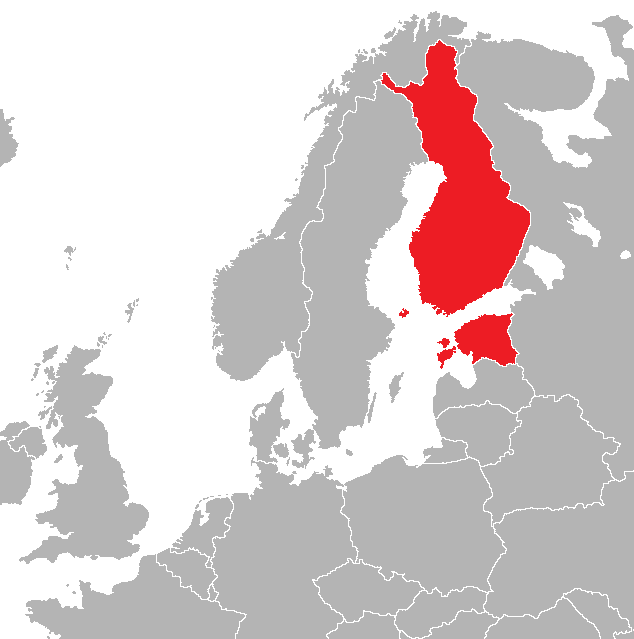
Map of a hypothetical Finno-Estonian union

Following the Estonian War of Independence, society was highly individualistic and unstable, leading to rise of the Vaps Movement, an Estonian nationalist and pan-nationalistic veterans' organization and political movement, who were on the path of winning public support, until a coup by moderate Konstantin Päts in 1934, leading to the banning of the Vaps Movement. However Päts, like many influential statesmen knew that Estonia could not stand alone against the Soviet Union and therefore was not opposed to Pan-Finnic ideas, with him advocating for the unification between Finland and Estonia for a Pan-Finnic Estonian–Finnish federation in 1940 to Risto Ryti. Estonian pan-nationalist sentiment was therefore limited to volunteers such as the Infantry Regiment 200 following the annexation of Estonia by the Soviet Union, as Finland was seen as the only country left to defend the Finno-Ugric peoples and therefore to unify them, which gave more way to the Greater Finland idea to become more mainstream than an equal union between nations, as all other "nations" had been occupied by the Soviets.

Hungary as a nation held strong relations with both Finland and Estonia during the Interwar period and during the Second World War, with the Horthy Government recognizing the Independence of Finland in 1920, strong bilateral relations were often developed by both sides due to linguistic kinship between the two nations, seeing each other as 'brotherly nations'. The Hungarians provided a volunteer battalion to the Finns during the Winter War and with the two nations fighting on the same side during Operation Barbarossa, relations only improved. This change in attitude from the years of the Victorian era could be explained with the relative collapse of the Turanian Society and the collapse of their influence.

=== After the Second World War ===
Following the Finnish defeat in the Continuation War, the idea faded towards obscurity within most of Finno-Ugric world, due to the strength of the Soviet Union and their hostility to the idea. It is widely believed that the Karelo-Finnish SSR was planned to encompass all of Finland and Karelia, given its Fennocentric naming.

=== Pan-Finnicism today ===
==== In Finland ====
Proposed Finno-Ugric flag, created by Szymon Pawlas in 2012

Pan-Finnicism in Modern Finland is not very popular, believed in or advocated for by many. Instead, organizations such as the Finland–Russia Society, advocate for rights for Finno-Ugric peoples and offer language studies. Pan-Finnicism in Finland is not a decisive political issue, most Finns instead do not wish for any territorial expansion or are only focused on the Karelia Question, for which a unification, the return of Finnish Karelia to Finland, seems more likely, than unification between Finland and Estonia. There were increasing demands from the Finns Party Youth, to re-annex Finnish Karelia and sometimes all of Karelia, until its dissolvement as the official Youth of the Finns Party.

==== In Estonia ====
Organizations such as the Tuglas Society are friendship societies that advocate for the deepening of Estonia-Finland relations. Estonia is also home to the World Congress of Finno-Ugric Peoples, the official mission of the Congress is to "develop and protect national identity, cultures and languages of Finno-Ugric peoples, to promote cooperation between Finno-Ugric peoples, to discuss topical issues and to identify solutions, and to realize the right of Finno-Ugric peoples to self-determination in accordance with international norms and principles". Politically there are no major parties which outright advocate for the unification of the Finno-Ugric peoples. However, polling from 2018 onward has shown that 34% of Estonians would vote "yes" in a referendum to join Finland.

==== In Karelia ====
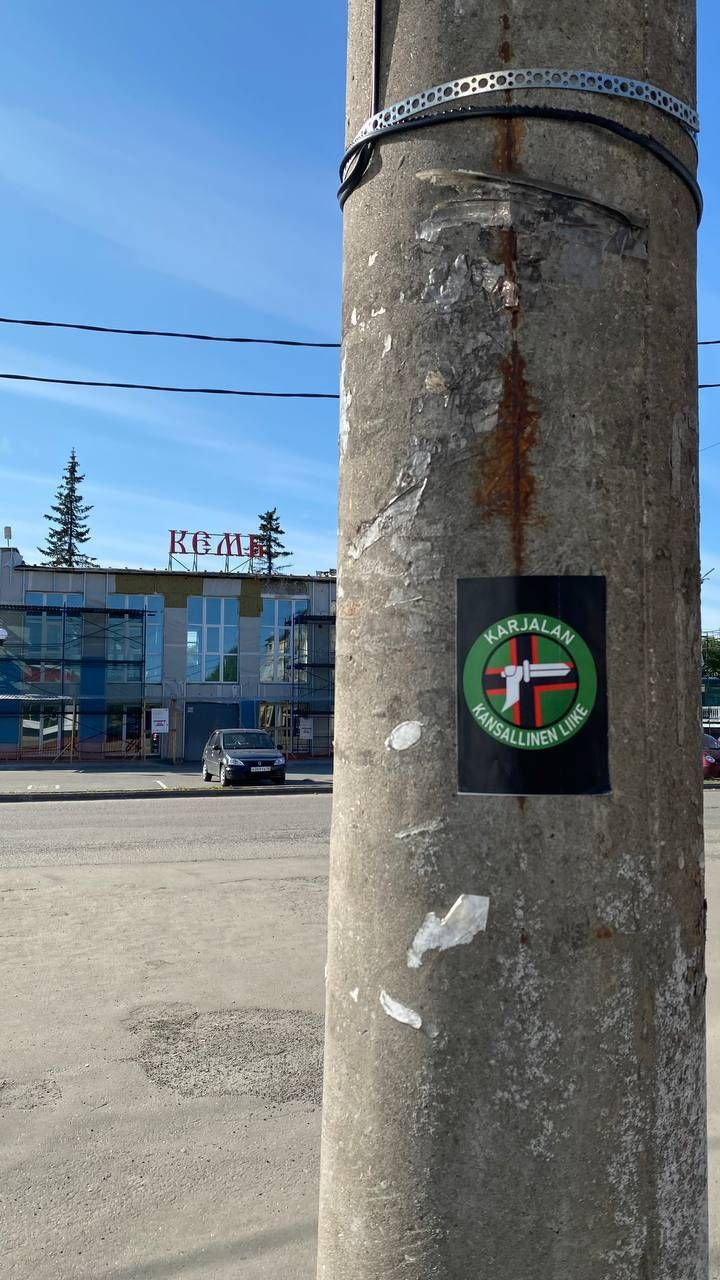
Karelian National Movement sticker in the Republic of Karelia

In the Republic of Karelia located within Russia, there are increasing Pan-Finnicist movements popping up across the region with organizations such as Suur-Suomen Sotilaat and the Karelian National Movement (Oleynik faction), which have advocated for Pan-Fennicist ideas such as the socio-economic cooperation in the form of a supranational union between the Finno-Ugric peoples within their own respective nation-states. The Karelian National Movement also holds strong ties to other nationalist organizations within Finland, Estonia and other Finno-Ugric nationalist movements within Russia, such as the Conservative People's Party of Estonia in Estonia and various with Finnish fight clubs, most notably Active Club.

==== In Hungary ====
In 1960, the first International Congress for Finno-Ugric Studies, the largest scientific meeting of scientists studying the culture and languages of Finno-Ugric peoples, was held in Budapest. In 2007, the 1st Festival of the Finno-Ugric Peoples was visited by then Hungarian Prime Minister Ferenc Gyurcsány.

World Congresses of Finno-Ugric Peoples have been held since 1992, alternately in Russia, Finland, Hungary and Estonia. In 2012, the 6th World Congress of Finno-Ugric Peoples was held in Siófok.

The Youth Association of Finno-Ugric Peoples was created in 1990. The association unites Finno-Ugric youth from more than 35 national organizations and facilitates cooperation between Finno-Ugric youth from Hungary, the Russian Federation, Finland, and Estonia.

Emblem of the Youth Association of Finno-Ugric Peoples

The association participated in the United Nations Permanent Forum on Indigenous Issues.

Since 2014, an annual Finno-Ugric Capital of Culture has been selected at the initiative of the association. These have been: 2014 – Starye Bygi (Udmurtia, Russia), 2015 – Obinitsa (Estonia), 2016 – Iszkaszentgyörgy and Veszprém (Hungary), 2017 – Voknavolok (Karelia, Russia), 2019 – Uncho (Mari El, Russia), 2020 – Miskino (Bashkiria, Russia), 2021 – Abja-Paluoja (Estonia), 2022 – Bayterek (Udmurtia, Russia), 2023 – Kuhmo (Finland), 2025 – Narva (Estonia), 2026 – Hancock (Michigan, United States).

== See also ==
- Pan-Scandinavianism
- Pan-Slavism
