= Finnish Institute =

Finnish Institute may refer to:

- Finnish Institute at Athens
- Finnish Institute in London
- Finnish Institute in Tallinn
