= Estonia–Finland relations =

Bilateral relations of Estonia and Finland

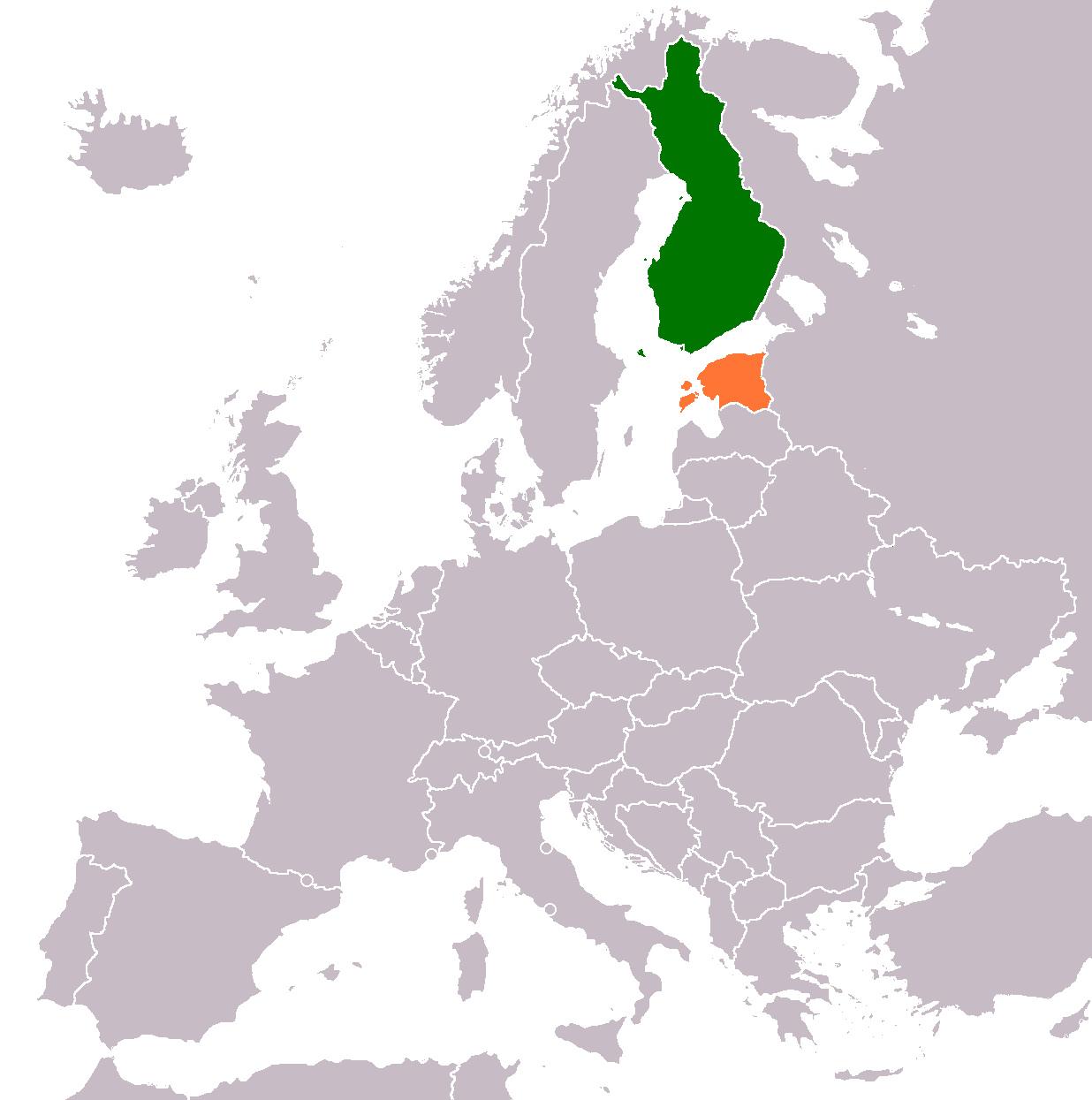
- Finland: Estonia

Estonia–Finland relations are the bilateral relations between Finland and Estonia. The independent Republic of Finland, established in 1917, and the independent Republic of Estonia, established in 1918, established diplomatic relations and formally recognised each other in 1920. Diplomatic relations between the two countries were interrupted during both World War II and the Cold War and officially restored on 29 August 1991. Finland has an embassy in Tallinn. Estonia has an embassy in Helsinki. Both countries are full members of the Council of the Baltic Sea States, Council of Europe, Joint Expeditionary Force, European Union, NATO and the Eurozone. Both countries share a border with Russia.

Finland has given full support to Estonia's membership of the European Union. Estonia also has strongly supported Finland's NATO membership. The majority of languages in both countries are Finnic languages, as Finland's main language, Finnish, is related to Estonian, and there is and has been a certain feeling of kinship. 76% of Finns have visited Estonia, and in 2004, 1.8 million Finns reported visiting Estonia. The excise tax on alcohol is lower in Estonia than in Finland, thus it is common to buy large volumes of alcohol when returning from Estonia: a study in 2014 indicated that 34% of alcohol sold in Estonia is bought by Finns. Finnish and Swedish investors are the largest foreign investors in Estonia.

Both Finland and Estonia are members of the European Union, Schengen agreement and the Eurozone, freeing international travel and trade between the countries. Finland is Estonia's top import partner, accounting for over 15% total import value in 2012, as well as the second-greatest market for Estonia's exports after Sweden. Finland's government recognised Estonia's independence in 1920. In response to the Soviet invasion, diplomatic missions were de facto removed. However, when Estonia restored its independence, this "temporary obstruction" was resolved. During the restoration of Estonia's independence, Finland secretly contributed with significant economic aid and know-how under the cover of "cultural co-operation" in order to not upset the Soviet Union. Finland continues to contribute militarily, such as officers' training, and the provision of equipment.

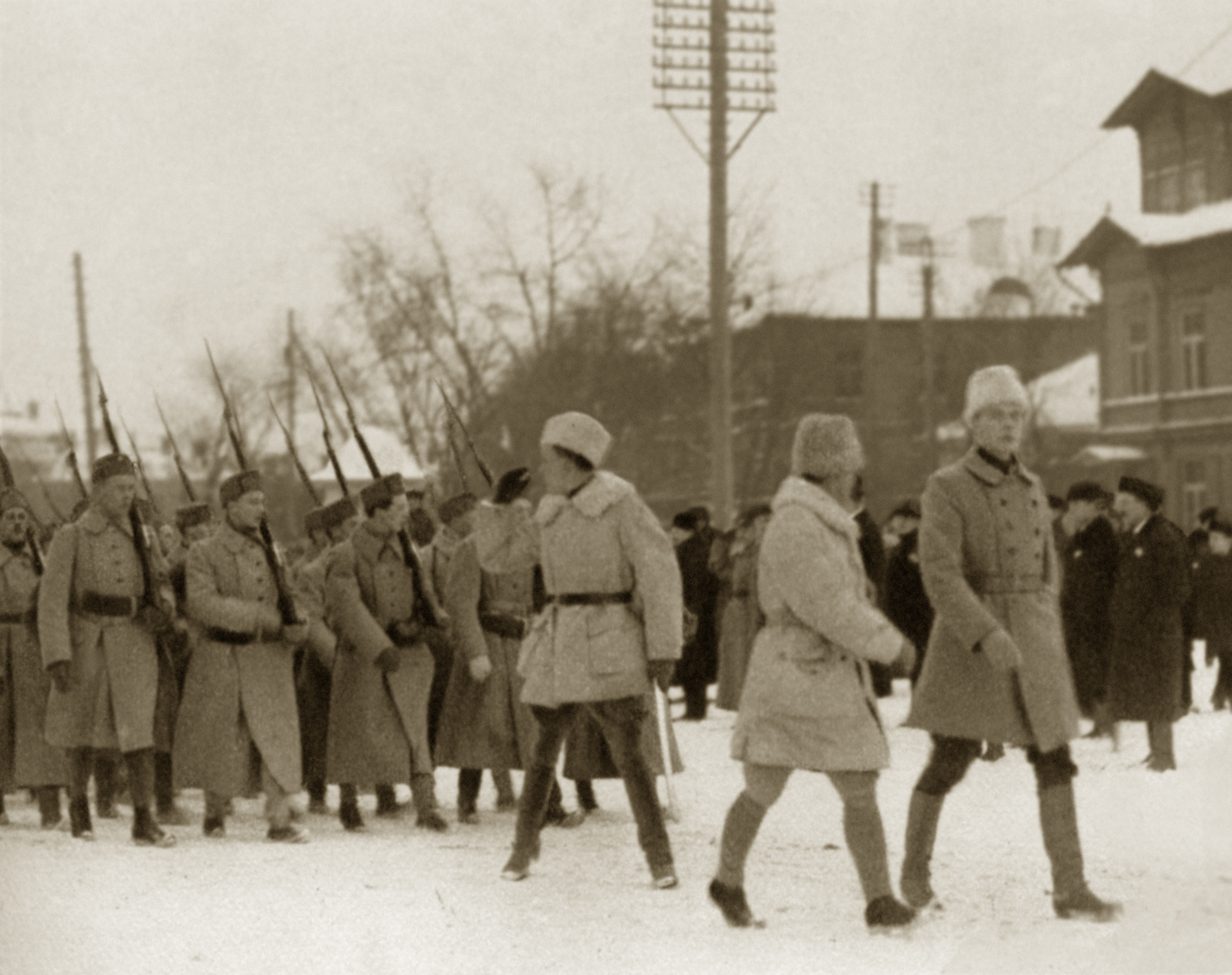
Finnish volunteers in Tallinn during the Estonian War of Independence

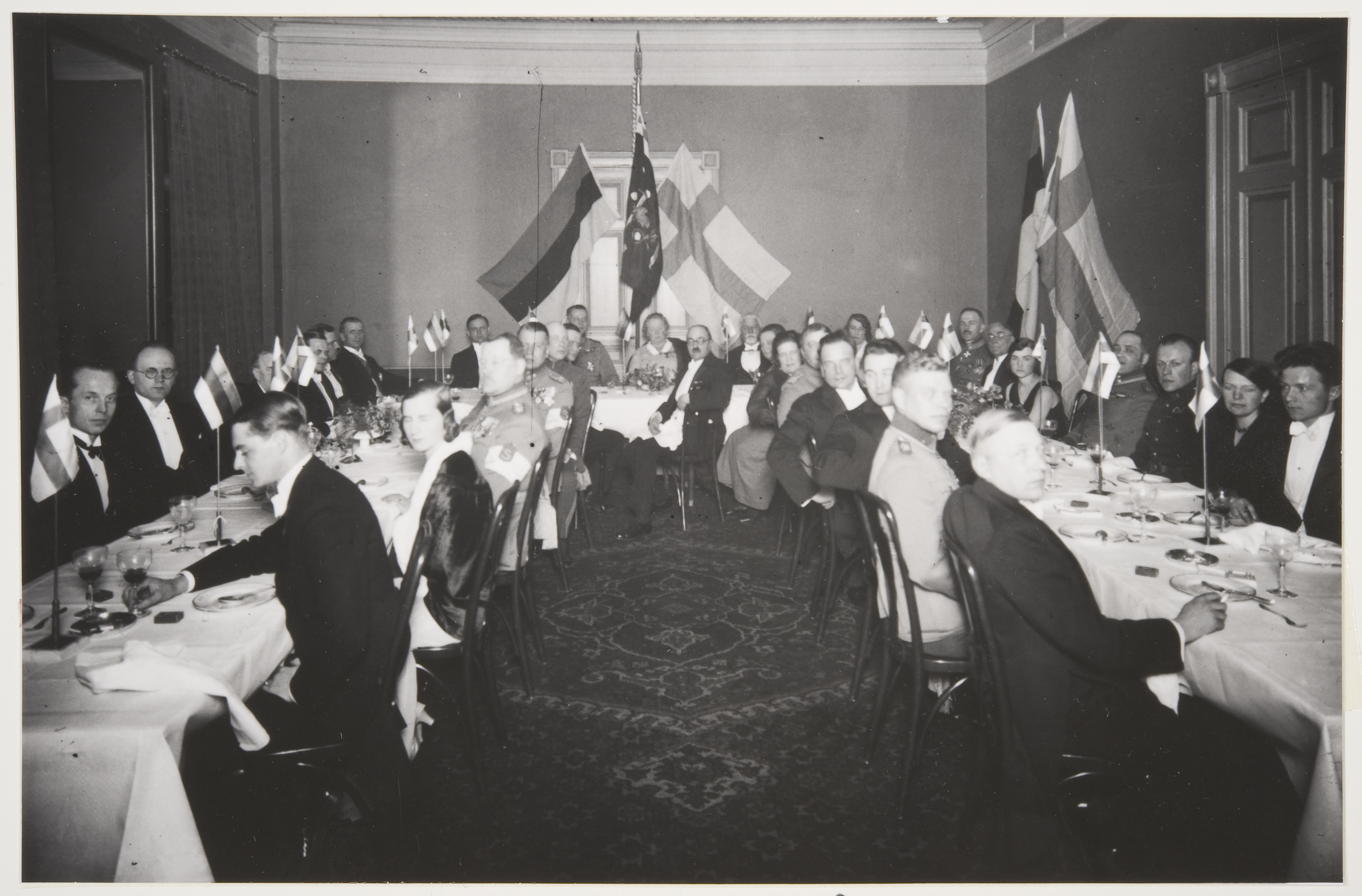
Finns with Estonian guests, 1931

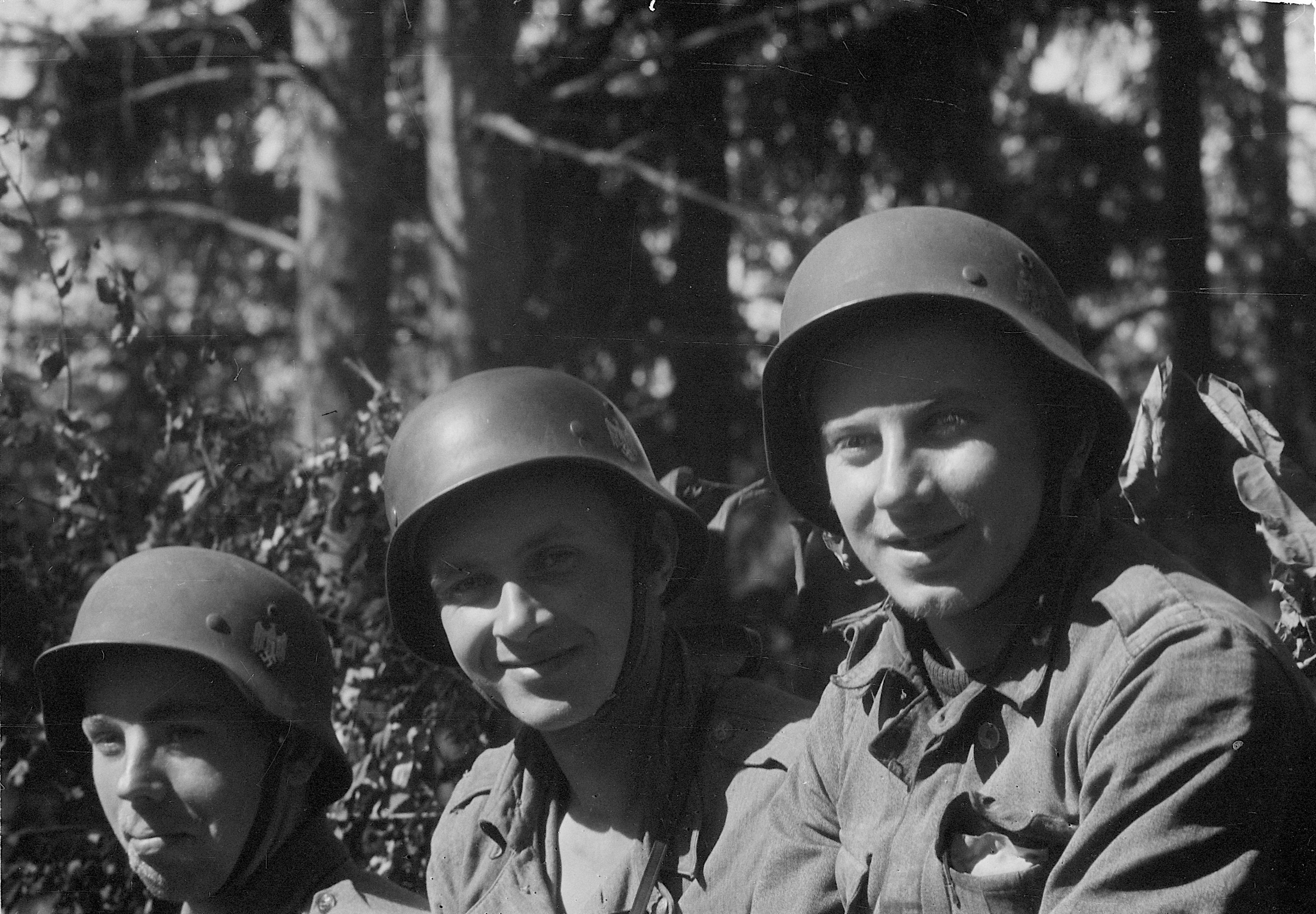
Estonian volunteers fighting for Finland against the Soviet Union during the Continuation War

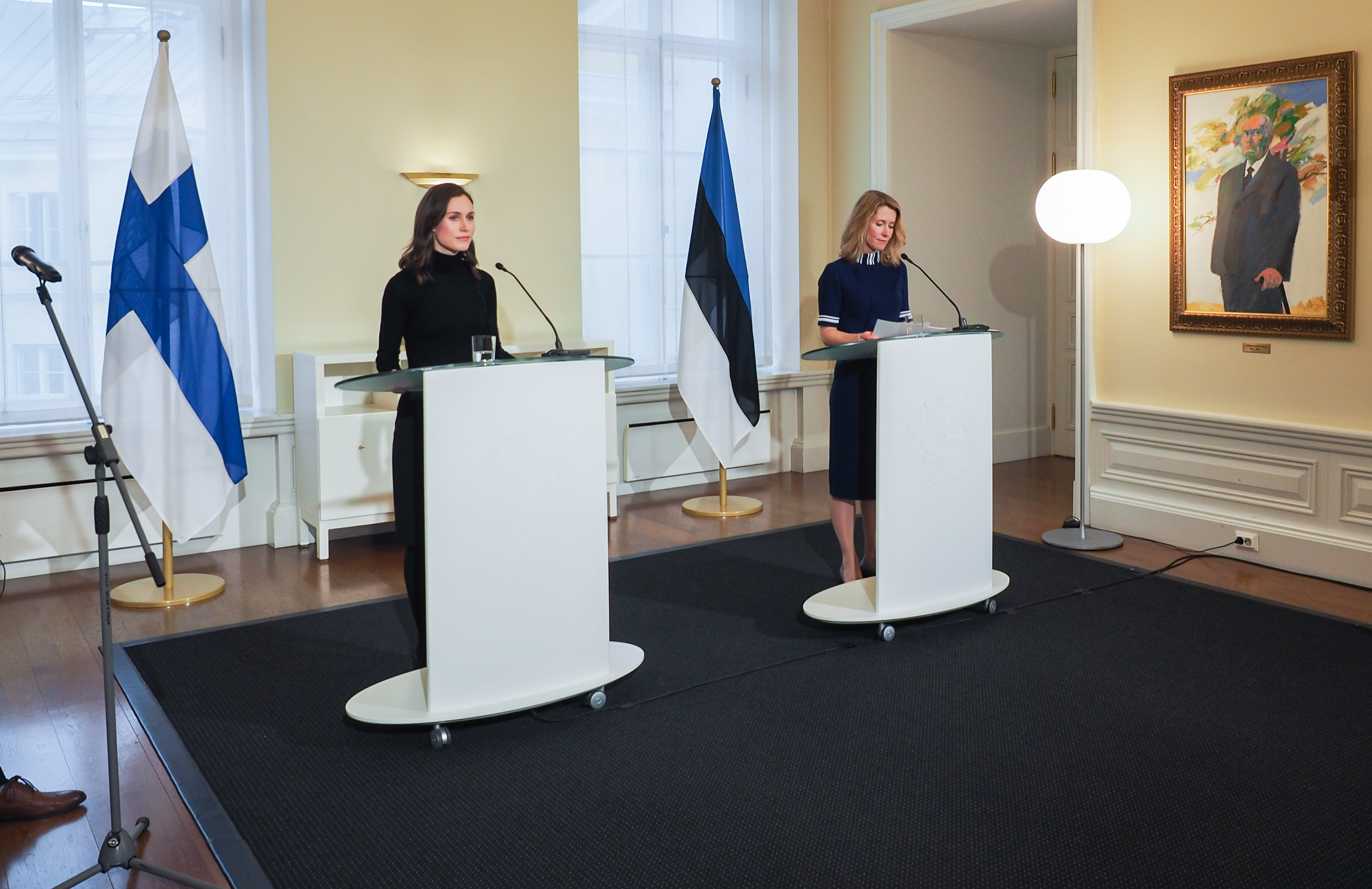
Finnish Prime Minister Sanna Marin and Estonian Prime Minister Kaja Kallas in Tallinn 7. March 2022

== History ==
The origins of the Finns and Estonians date back to the early Iron Age. Both populations trace their roots to Finno-Ugric tribes that settled north and south of the Gulf of Finland from Siberia in the 1st millennium BC at the latest. Linguistically, Finnish and Estonian belong to the Finno-Ugric group of the Uralic language family. Despite their linguistic proximity, the peoples developed independently of each other, with the Estonians coming into closer contact with Germanic and Baltic groups at an early stage. Archaeological finds and runestones prove that active trade and cultural exchange between present-day Estonia and southern Finland already existed in the Viking Age (8th–11th century).

In the Middle Ages, both peoples came under foreign rule – From the 13th century onwards, Estonia and Finland came under different foreign rulers: while Estonia gradually fell under Danish, later German-Baltic and finally Swedish control, Finland was completely under Swedish rule from 1323 onwards. With the Treaty of Nystad in 1721, Estonia became part of the Russian Empire. Finland followed with the Treaty of Fredrikshamn in 1809. In the 19th century, national movements arose in both countries, promoting their own languages and cultures. This connection created an awareness of mutual kinship, with ideas of Pan-Finnicism developing.

In the wake of the collapse of the Russian Empire after the World War I, two independent nation states emerged. Finland declared its independence in 1917, followed by Estonia on February 24, 1918. The two countries supported each other in their early struggles for independence: around 3,000–4,000 Finnish volunteers fought in the Estonian War of Independence (1918–1920) on the side of Estonia and in the Continuation War of 1944, many Estonian volunteers enlisted in the Finnish army in return. After the Treaty of Dorpat, Finland was the first country to recognize Estonia on June 8, 1920. In the interwar period, both countries established close cultural and economic ties and also cooperated secretly on military matters against a possible attack by the Soviet Union.

During the World War II, Estonia was occupied by the Soviet Union, severing official ties. Although Finland remained independent, it was under strong Soviet influence during the Cold War and could not openly challenge Estonia's annexation. Nevertheless, many Finns and Estonians maintained informal contacts; Finnish radio and television broadcasts were received in northern Estonia until the 1980s, forming a “window to the West” behind the Iron Curtain. In the late 1980s, Finland secretly supported Estonia's efforts to regain its freedom. President Mauno Koivisto provided a total of over 100 million Finnish markka to the Estonian independence movement, including expert assistance in establishing a market economy, even before the collapse of the Soviet Union.

After Estonia regained its independence in 1991, diplomatic relations were immediately reestablished. Finland and Estonia cooperated in building democratic institutions and a strong modern economy in Estonia. Since then, the two countries have maintained close contacts at all levels and often coordinate their foreign policy in the Baltic Sea region and in Europe. Finland was one of the strongest supporters in Europe of Estonia's accession to the EU, which took place in 2004. In 2020, both countries celebrated the 100th anniversary of the establishment of official diplomatic relations. The Russian invasion of Ukraine alarmed both countries, which stepped up their military cooperation. In 2023, Finland abandoned its long-standing foreign policy of neutrality and joined NATO, which Estonia had already joined in 2004.

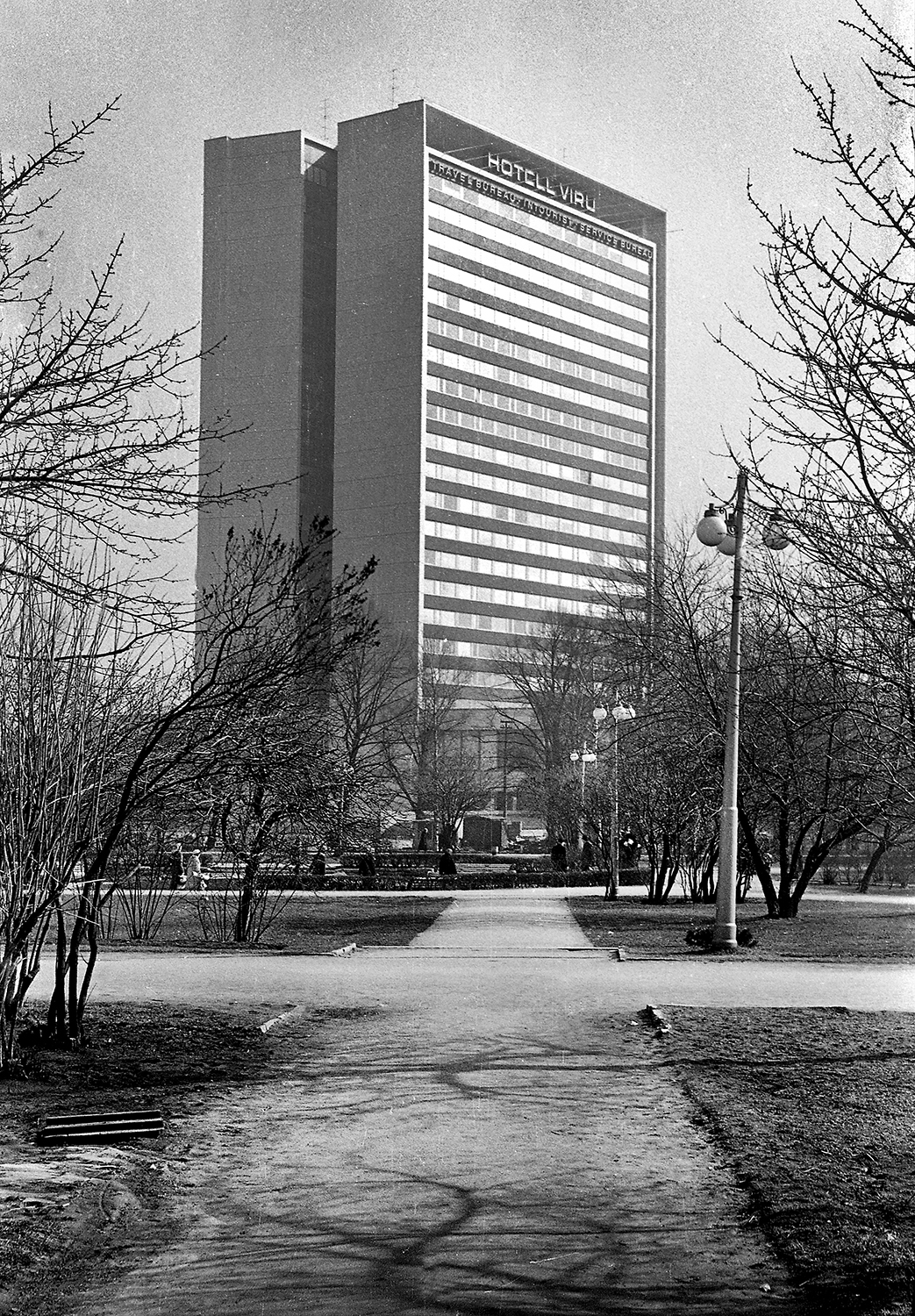
Finnish construction company Haka Oy finished the Hotel Viru in May 1972.

== Unification proposals ==
In Finland, the idea of a unified Greater Finland gained popularity and influence rapidly in 1917, but lost support after World War II and the Continuation War.

In 1917, 1918 and 1940, the Estonian president Konstantin Päts wished for a union of Finnic countries in his political testament, writing an outline of a unification plan. He used the term "soomesugu" in Estonian to point to the people and countries of Finland and Estonia when talking about common border law.

== Anthem ==
The Finnish anthem Maamme and the similarly themed Estonian anthem Mu isamaa, mu õnn ja rõõm (My Fatherland, My Happiness and Joy, 1869) share the same melody.

This song is also considered to be the ethnic anthem of Livonians, titled Min izāmō, min sindimō (My Fatherland, My Native Land).

== Regional cooperation ==
Both Finland and Estonia are members of the World Congress of Finno-Ugric Peoples

Finnish and Swedish investors are the largest foreign investors in Estonia. Both Finland and Estonia are members of the European Union, Schengen Agreement and the Eurozone. Finland is Estonia's fourth greatest import partner, accounting for 8.48% of its imports between 2017 and 2021, as well as the greatest market for Estonia's exports, accounting for 12.2% of Estonia's exports.

In July 2022, Estonia fully approved Finland's application for NATO membership.

Finland contributed and continues to contribute military aid to Estonia, such as officers' training, and the provision of equipment.

The Rail Baltica and Via Baltica, modern rail and road links of vital importance, connecting Finland with Estonia and Central Europe, remain under construction (as of 2022).

Balticconnector is a bi-directional natural gas pipeline between Finland and Estonia. Both countries are connected by the Estlink power cable.

== Resident diplomatic missions ==
- Estonia has an embassy in Helsinki.
- Finland has an embassy in Tallinn.
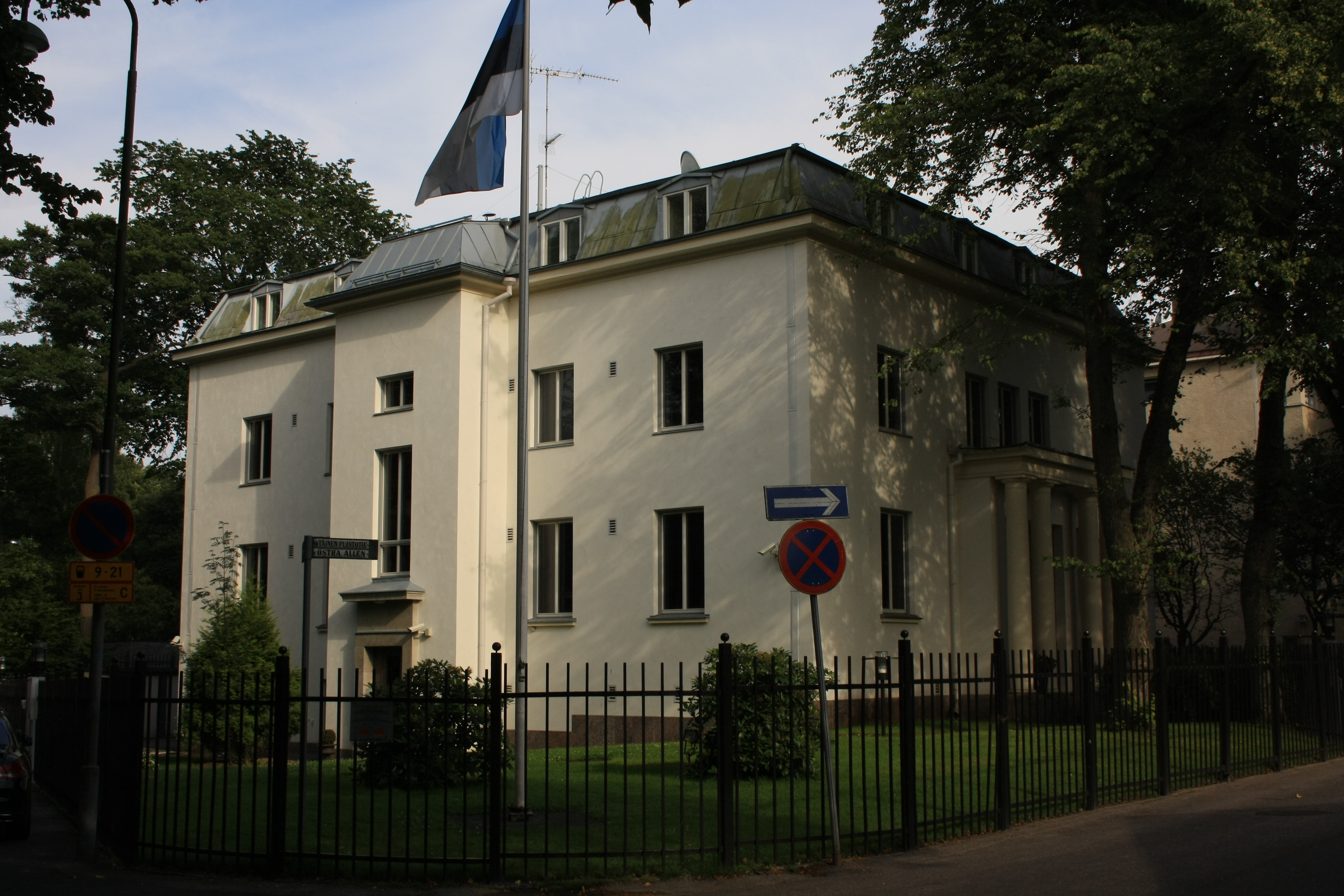
Embassy of Estonia in Helsinki

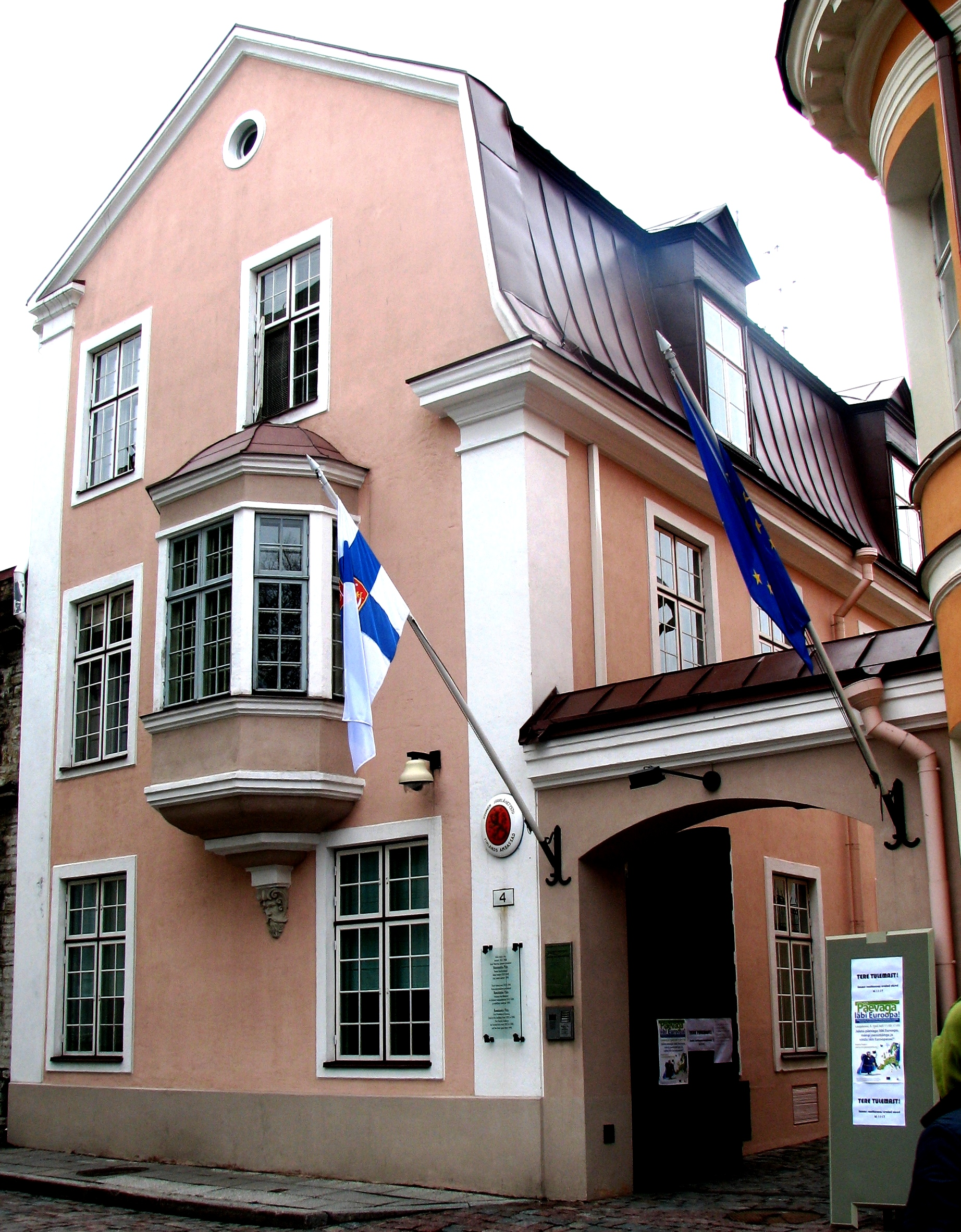
Embassy of Finland in Tallinn

== See also ==
- Foreign relations of Estonia
- Foreign relations of Finland
- Finnish–Estonian defence cooperation
- Finnish Infantry Regiment 200
- Estonians in Finland
- Estonian–Finnish federation
- Tuglas Society
