= Vasama =

Vasama may refer to:

== People ==
- Jaana Vasama (born 1966), Finnish politician
- Kaarlo Vasama (1885–1926), Finnish gymnast

== Other uses ==
- Lehtovaara PIK-16 Vasama, Finnish aircraft
