= Finnish Cultural and Academic Institutes =

- Founded: 2005; 21 years ago
- Founder: Government of Finland
- Type: Cultural institution
- Region served: Worldwide
- Product: Finnish cultural education

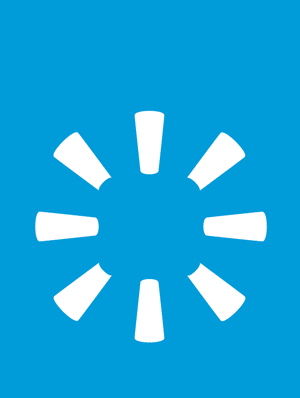
Finnish Cultural and Academic Institutes (SKTI)

The Finnish Cultural and Academic Institutes (in Finnish: Suomen kulttuuri- ja tiedeinstituutit) is a group of 17 independent, non-profit organisations around the world. The institutes advance and support international mobility, visibility and collaboration of Finnish professionals in the arts, culture and research.

== Goals ==
- Create networks and dialogue between Finnish and international cultural and academic organisations and professionals
- Organise exhibitions, seminars, courses and other events
- Collaborate actively with local organisations, partners, communities and professionals
- Run mobility and residency programmes for artists, curators and researchers
- Support the international work opportunities of Finnish arts professionals and researchers
- Conduct academic research

== The institutes ==
The institute network includes 17 institutes around the world

- Finnish Institute at Athens (Greece)
- Finnish Cultural Institute for the Benelux (Brussels),
- Finnish Institute in Germany (Berlin),
- Finnagora – Finnish Institute in Hungary (Budapest)
- Finnish Cultural Institute in Denmark (Copenhagen),
- Hanaholmen – Swedish-Finnish Cultural Centre (Espoo, Finland),
- The Finnish Institute in London (London)
- Finnish Cultural Institute in Madrid (Madrid),
- Finnish Institute in the Middle East (Beirut),
- Finnish Cultural Institute in New York (New York City),
- Finnish-Norwegian Cultural Institute (Oslo),
- Institut Finlandais (Paris),
- Institutum Romanum Finlandiae (Rome),
- Finnish Institute in Saint Peterburg (Russia),
- Finnish institute in Stockholm (Sweden),
- Finnish Institute in Estonia (Tallinn)
- Finnish Institute in Japan (Tokyo).

The Finnish Cultural and Academic Institutes (SKTI) is a Helsinki-based association that assists the institute network in communications, administration and lobbying in Finland. The institutes and SKTI are subsidised by the Ministry of Education and Culture in Finland. Their projects receive additional funding from private Finnish and foreign foundations, companies and partners.
