= Tuglas Society =

Finnish-Estonian friendship association

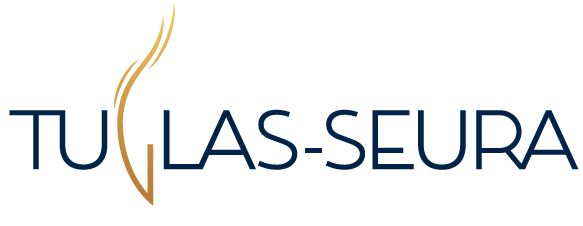
- Logo of the Tuglas Society
- Named after: Friedebert Tuglas
- Formation: May 3, 1982; 44 years ago
- Purpose: To collaborate Estonian-Finnish culture
- Headquarters: Suvilahti, Helsinki, Finland
- Members: ~3,000
- Chairman: Kirsti Narinen
- Executive Director: Jaana Vasama
- Website: www.tuglas.fi

Tuglas Society (Finnish: Tuglas-Seura, Estonian: Tuglase Selts) is a Finnish non-profit Friendship society to strengthen the cultural ties between Finns and Estonians. The society has eight local societies in Oulu, Lappeenranta, Lahti, Kotka, Hämeenlinna, Hyvinkää, Turku and Kuopio regions. The association organizes various cultural lectures, organizes group trips and organizes Finnish and Estonian language courses for Estonians and Finns.

The club is based in Suvilahti, Helsinki and the CEO of the society is Jaana Vasama and the chairman of the Board is Kirsti Narinen.

The best known of the Tuglas Society's events is the Martin Market, held at the end of November each year.

The number of members is around 3,000.

== Etymology ==
The name of the association derives from the name of Estonian writer and critic Friedebert Tuglas.

== History ==
The Tuglas Society was founded on 3 May 1982.

Due to the Singing Revolution, the number of members of the association grew strongly.

=== Magazine ===
The association publishes a membership magazine called Elo, which is published five times a year. The magazine has been publishing issues since 2009. Before that, the name of the magazine was the Tuglas Society. the Tuglas Society magazine was published at least since 1991. The club is based in Suvilahti, Helsinki.
