= Estonian–Finnish Union =

Possible federation between Estonia and Finland

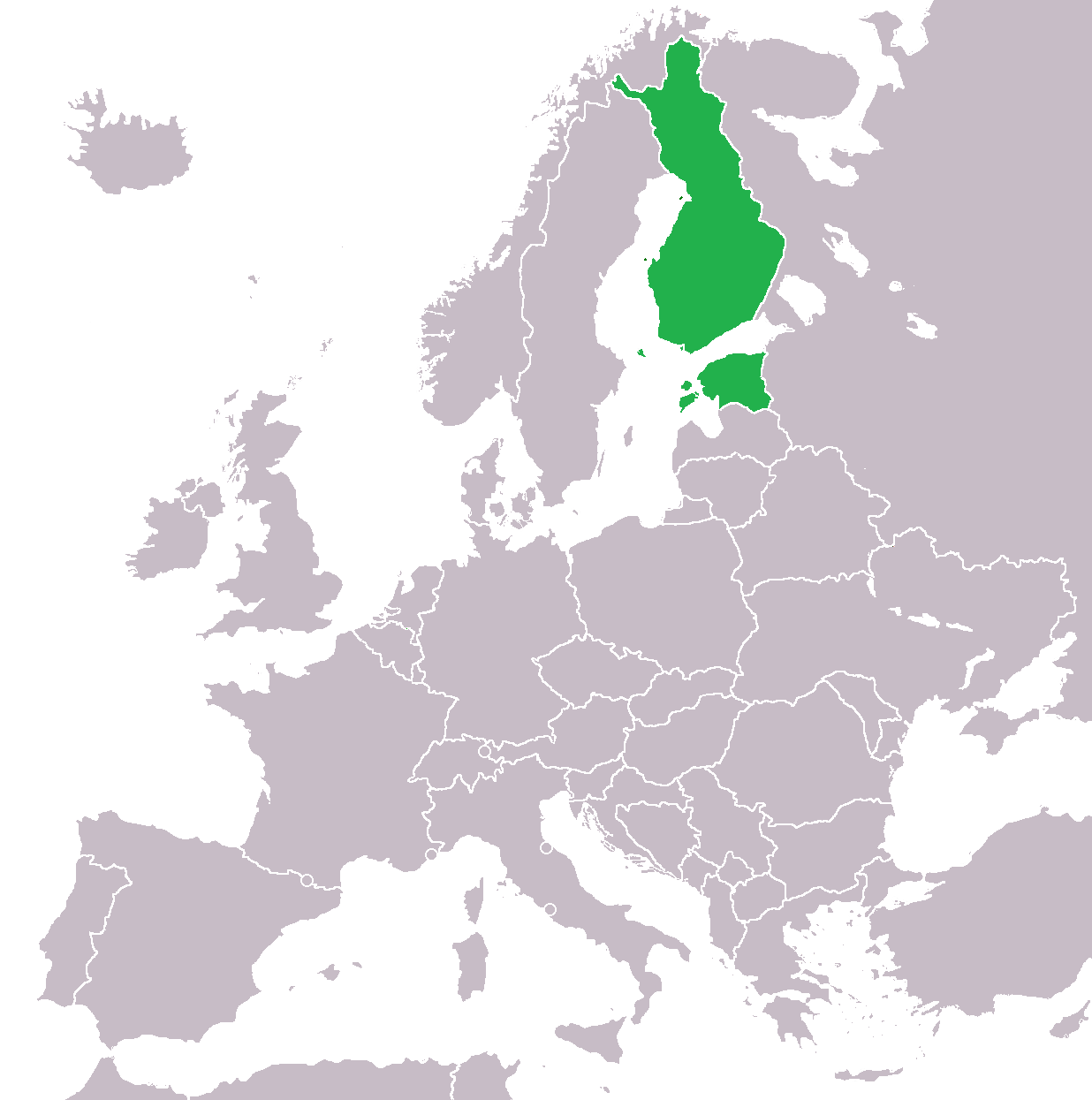
Map of a hypothetical Estonian–Finnish state

The idea of forming an Estonian–Finnish Union has been discussed several times in history, but has never been achieved. The idea of a Union was born as early as the 19th century, but it did not really take shape until the beginning of the 20th century. In Finland, views on the Union were mainly negative, and the idea of a union of countries was maintained mainly in Estonia. Finland did not want to focus on the Baltic states, but rather on relations with Scandinavia, particularly Sweden. The same reasons also led Estonia to seek allies in the Nordic countries. One of the most prominent supporters of an Estonian–Finnish union was the President of Estonia Konstantin Päts.

After the June 1940 coup, Konstantin Päts drew up a draft of the Estonian–Finnish union, which was handed over to Paavo Hynninen, an assistant to the Finnish Foreign Minister, through the commanding officer H. Grabb before Päts was deported to Russia.

Polling from 2018 onward has shown that 34% of Estonians would vote "yes" in a referendum to join Finland.

== History ==
Proposed Estonian flag from 1919, featuring a Nordic cross

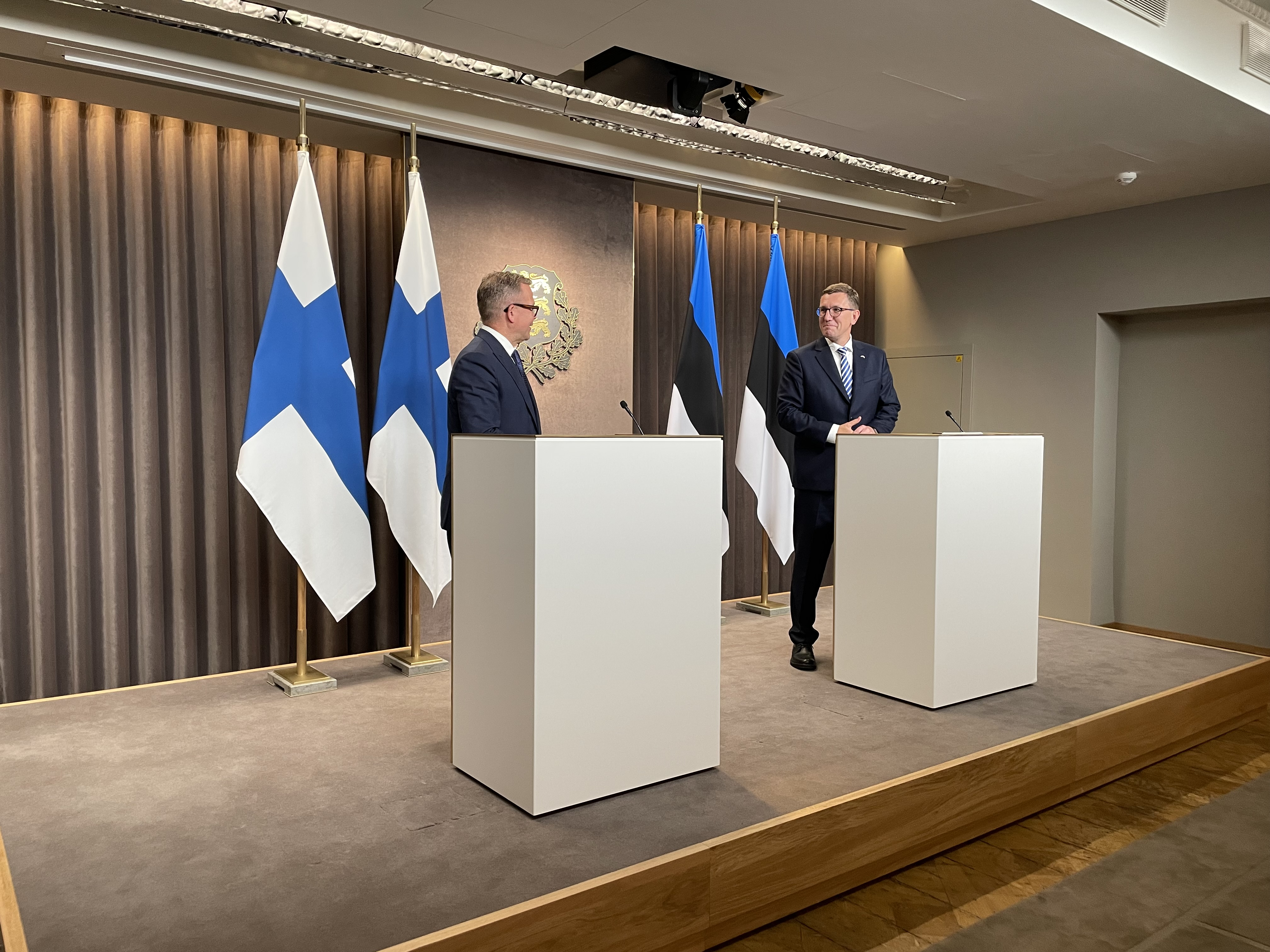
Finnish Prime Minister Petteri Orpo and Estonian Prime Minister Kristen Michal

The idea of a state union between Finland and Estonia arose in Estonia with the national awakening. The topic was discussed, for example, in Lydia Koidula's poem The Finnish Bridge from 1881. The Estonian author Friedebert Tuglas supported the idea of a union between Finland and Estonia, but said that a complete unification of the countries would be impossible. He preferred a consortium of states such as Austria-Hungary or Sweden-Norway as a better idea. Konstantin Päts, who served as the Prime Minister of the Estonian Provisional Government in 1918, and Foreign Minister Jaan Poska drafted a memorandum on the foundations of a possible Finnish-Estonian state union (federal state), in which they presented a state union in which both states retained autonomy and their own parliaments. In contrast, the federal government would have had a common president, a foreign minister, a war minister, and an army. Päts continued to push for the idea of a state union during the Estonian War of Independence, when he hoped in an interview with the Finnish press that a common Finnish-Estonian republic would be established, with the president living in Helsinki. At that time, it was still widely believed in Estonia that Estonia alone would be too weak and that a state union with Finland was a necessity. The matter was discussed on December 8, 1917, at the Estonian Council of Elders, where Jaan Raamot spoke about the positive attitude of Pehr Evind Svinhufvud, Speaker of the Senate of Finland. In his speech to the Council of Elders, Päts supported the Union and welcomed the idea.

The idea of a union of countries was relegated to the background after the end of the Estonian War of Independence, but on July 30, 1940, Päts suggested to Finland's Estonian ambassador P. J. Hynninen that Estonia unite into a federation with the same defense, foreign and economic policy and currency. Päts was arrested on the same day by Soviet occupation forces. After Nazi Germany occupied Estonia in the summer of 1941, the idea of a union re-emerged. Admiral Johan Pitka presented a proposal for a state union to the President of Finland, Risto Ryti, in Helsinki on November 29, 1941, but Finland's position on the matter was still negative. Foreign Minister Rolf Witting justified the negative position on the grounds that Finland would not be able to defend Estonia's territory, and on the fact that Estonians and Finns were so different in nature and mentality that they could not grow together.

== See also ==
- Pan-Finnicism
- Estonia-Finland relations
- Talsinki
- Union State
