= Ria Berg =

Finnish archaeologist

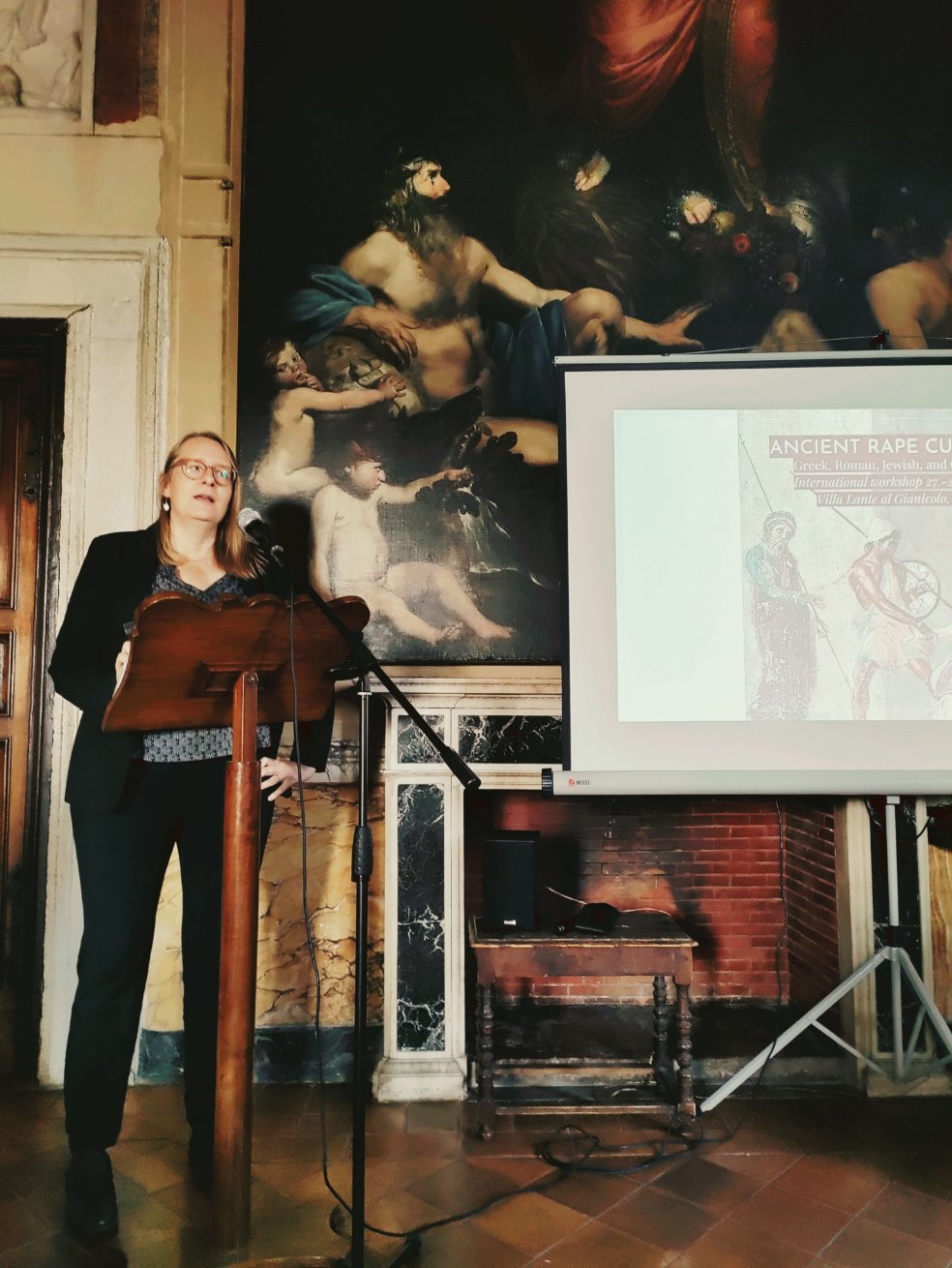
- Professor Ria Berg, Rome, October 2022
- Known for: Research on Pompeii, domestic space and objects, Roman mirrors, gender archaeology Director of the Finnish Institute in Rome
- Title: Professor of Archaeology

Academic background
- Education: University of Helsinki (Ph.D., 2010)
- Thesis: 'Il mundus muliebris nelle fonti latine e nei contesti pompeiani' (2010)

Academic work
- Institutions: Institutum Romanum Finlandiae University of Helsinki
- Notable works: Tangible Religion. Materiality of Domestic Cult Practices from Antiquity to Early Modern Era (2021)

Ria Berg is Director of the Institutum Romanum Finlandiae (Rome), also known as The Finnish Institute in Rome. The Finnish Institute is an academic institution that supports research in the Humanities, particularly in relation to Ancient History and Italy. Berg is a Professor of Archaeology. She specialises in Pompeii, material domestic space and objects, Roman mirrors, and gender archaeology.

== Education ==
Berg received her PhD from the University of Helsinki in 2010. Her doctoral thesis was entitled, Il mundus muliebris nelle fonti latine e nei contesti pompeiani.

== Career ==
Berg was appointed as Director of the Institutum Romanum Finlandiae in August 2021. She was previously assistant (2001-5) and then deputy director (2012–16) of the Institute.

== Bibliography ==
- Tangible Religion. Materiality of Domestic Cult Practices from Antiquity to Early Modern Era, ed. by Ria Berg, Antonella Coralini, and Anu Kaisa Koponen (Quasar, 2021)
