= Jaakko Suolahti =

Finnish classical scholar and historian (1918–1987)

Jaakkko Suolahti
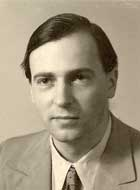
- Jaakkko Wilhelm Suolahti
- Born: Jaakkko Wilhelm Suolahti; 18 January 1918; Brändö, Åland
- Died: 28 January 1987 (aged 69); Helsingfors, Finland
- Known for: Social and Cultural History of the Roman Republic
- Scientific career
- Fields: Classical scholar, jurist, ancient historian
- Workplaces: University of Helsingfors
- Academic advisors: Pekka Katara

Jaakko Suolahti (18 January 1918 – 28 January 1987) was a Finnish classical scholar and historian Suolahti was one of the leading classicists during his time and reached international recognition within the areas of political- and social culture in the Roman Republic.

== Life ==
Suolahti was born in Brändö on Åland (Autonomous region within Finland) in 1918 into an esteemed finish academic family. His father was Gunnar Suolahti, a Finnish historian of great national esteem. His father became a professor in Nordic History at the University of Helsingfors the same year as Jakko was born and would keep the tenure until his death in 1933. His father was the frontrunner for the Leipzig school of historical theory based on Karl Lamprecht in Finland. His uncle, Hugo Suolahti, was principal and later chancellor of the University of Helsingfors and a cousin, Eino Suolahti would become one of Finlands most prolific essayists and historical writers.

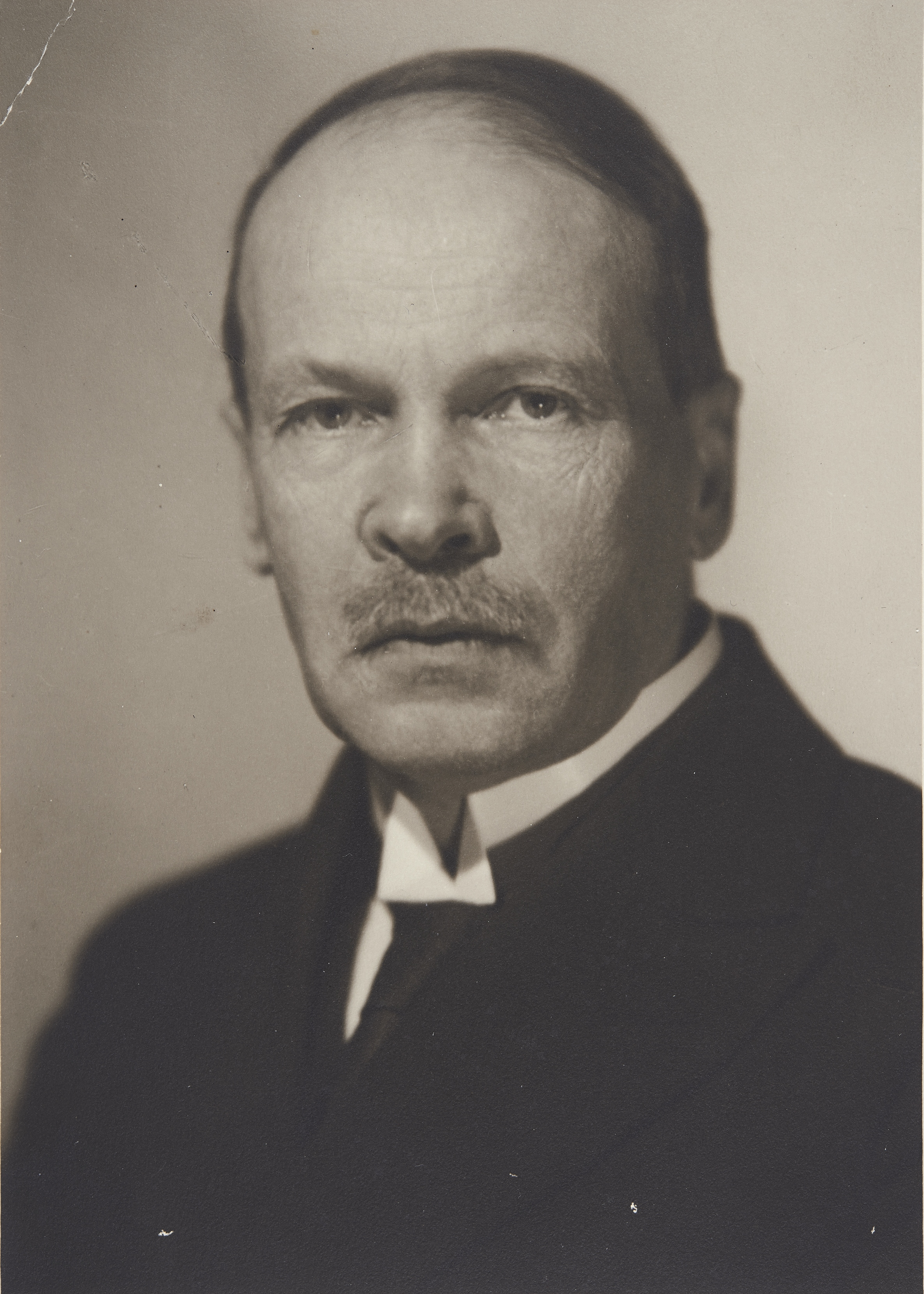
Gunnar Suolahti, father of Jaakko, Professor in Nordic, Scandinavian and Finnish History

Suolahti worked from 1947 to 1956 in the National Archives of Finland while he worked on his disputation in History which was finished in 1955 at the University of Helsingfors. He was appointed professor of history in 1960 and would remain as such until his retirement in 1981. During the period 1962 to 1965 he was the director of the Institutum Romanum Finlandiae (located in Villa Lante al Gianicolo in Rome), the Finnish Institute in Rome.

== Bibliography ==
- Suolahti, Jaakko, On the Persian sources used by the Byzantine historian Agathias., Societas, Helsinki, 1947
- Suolahti, Jaakko, The junior officers of the Roman army in the Republican period: a study on social structure, Diss. Helsingfors : Univ., Helsinki, 1955
- Suolahti, Jaakko, The Roman censors: a study on social structure, Helsinki, 1963
