= Kirsti Narinen =

Finnish diplomat

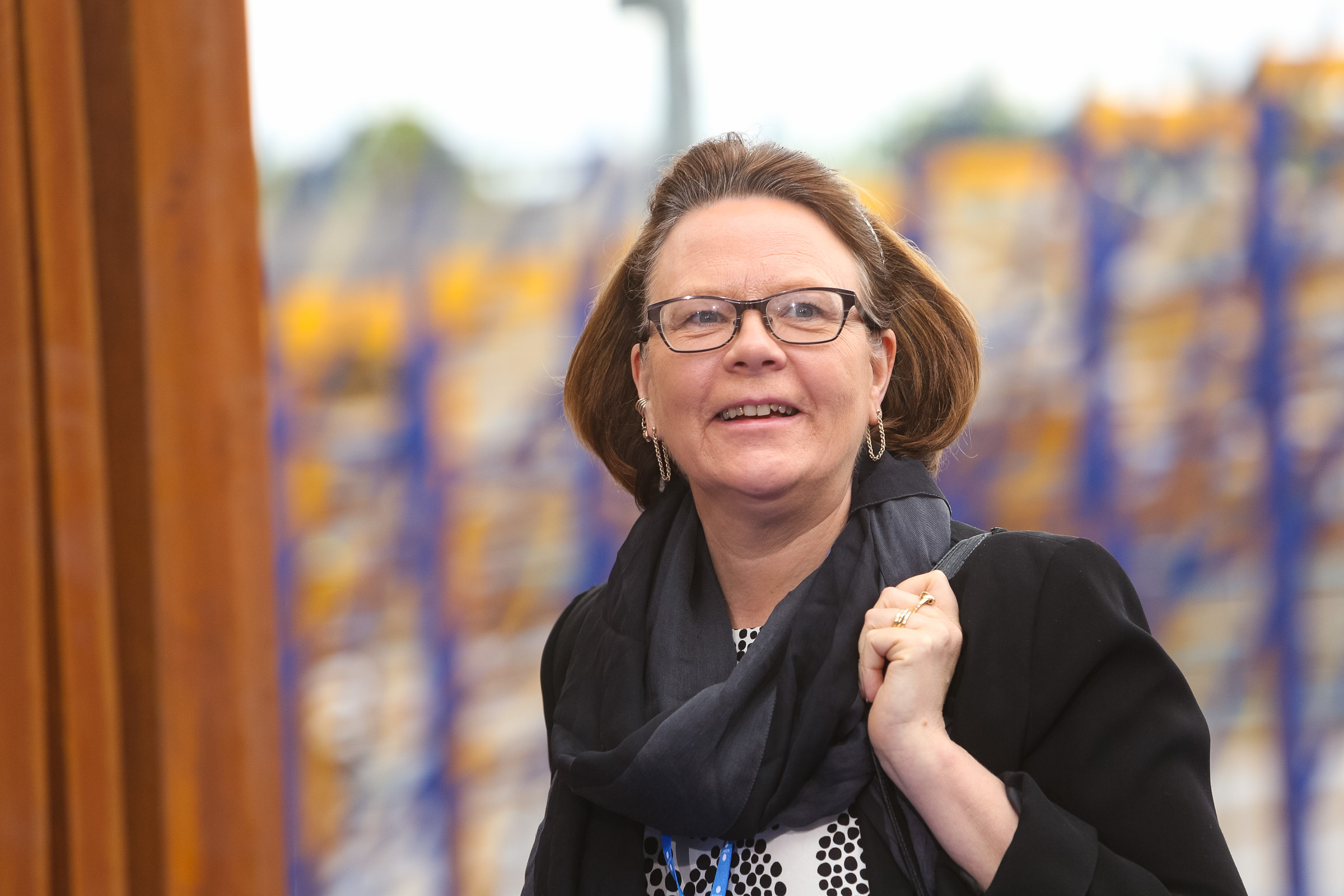
Kirsti Narinen (2017)

Kirsti Johanna Narinen is a Finnish diplomat. She was appointed Finnish Ambassador to Estonia on September 1, 2014. Narinen started to work in the Foreign Ministry in 1984.

Narinen has worked at the Finnish Embassy in Tallinn in the past, as second officer from 1993 to 1998 and served in Finnish Foreign Missions in Leningrad and later in the Consulate General in St. Petersburg and at the Finnish Embassy in Ljubljana.

After Tallinn, Narinen moved from the Ministry of Foreign Affair's administration to become director of occupational well-being services in the same ministry. She has also worked at the Ministry's Political and European Departments.
