= Finnish Institute in Tallinn =

Finnish cultural organization in Estonia

Finnish Institute in Tallinn (Estonian: Soome Instituut) is a non-profit organization, whose headquarters are located in Tallinn, Estonia. The institute's goals are to maintain, develop, and strengthen Finnish–Estonian cultural cooperation in different art, education, and society fields. The institute is maintained by the Foundation of the Finnish Institute in Estonia.

The institute was founded in 1991.

The institute has also premises in Tartu.

The institute belongs to Finnish Cultural and Academic Institutes.

== Directors ==
- Seppo Zetterberg (1994–1996)
- Juhani Salokannel (1997–2000)
- Martti Turtola (2001–2004)
- Jaana Vasama (2005–2009)
- Riitta Heinämaa (2010–2014)
- Anu Laitila (2015–2018)
- Anu Heinonen (2019–2021)
- Hannele Valkeeniemi (2021–)
