= Institutum Romanum Finlandiae =

Academic institution in Italy

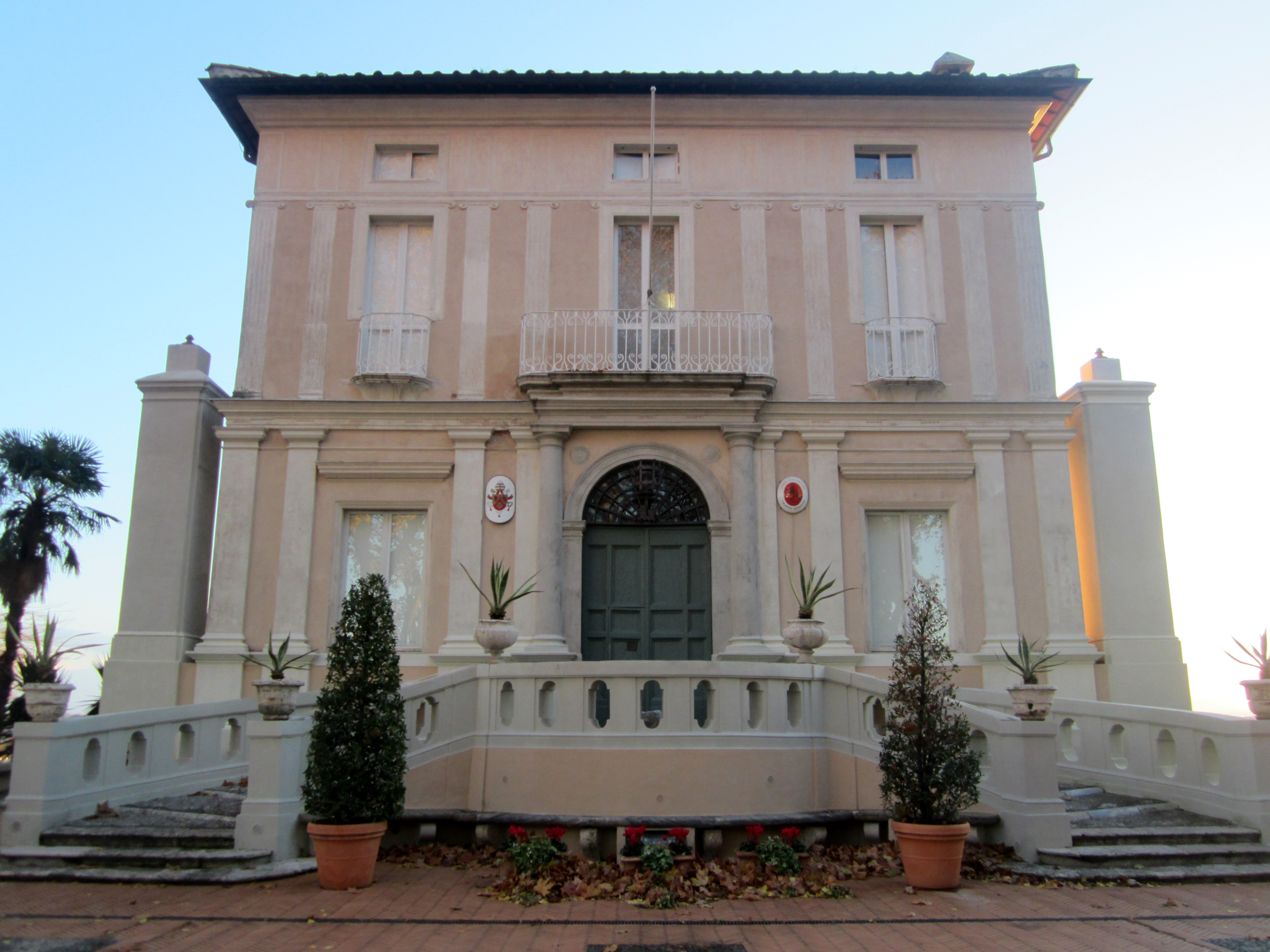
Entrance facade of the Villa Lante, Rome

Institutum Romanum Finlandiae, also known as The Finnish Institute in Rome, is an academic institution that supports research in the humanities, particularly in relation to ancient history and Italy. The institute was inaugurated on 29 April 1954, and is based at Villa Lante, a Renaissance-era villa in Rome.

== History ==
The foundation that runs the Institutum Romanum Finlandiae was established in Helsinki on 4 November 1938 by Amos Anderson, patron of the arts and culture and owner of the largest Swedish-language newspaper in Finland. Villa Lante was purchased for use by the foundation on 23 April 1950, funded by Anderson.

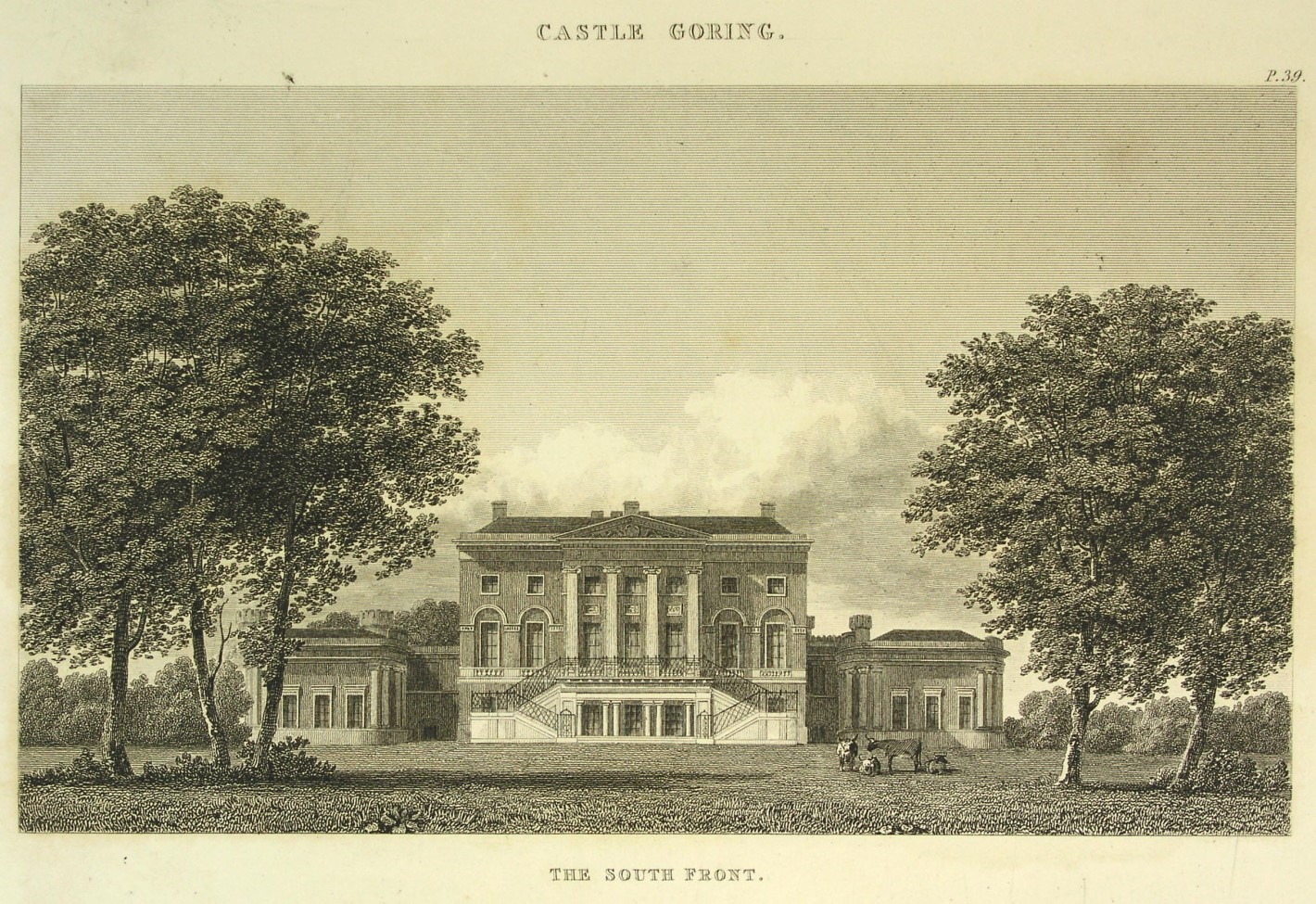
The facade of Castle Goring, England, which was modelled on Villa Lante

The villa is situated on the Janiculum Hill (Gianicolo) in Rome. It was designed by Giulio Romano, a student of Raphael, in 1520–1521 for Baldassare Turini. The villa provides spectacular views of the surrounding loggia. During the seventeenth century, ownership of the villa came into the hands of Ippolito Lante Montefeltro della Rovere, Duke of Bomarzo. The Lante family was forced to sell the villa in the early nineteenth century because of financial penury. In the late nineteenth century, the villa was owned by the German archaeologist Wolfgang Helbig. The architectural and cultural influence of Villa Lante is discernible in Castle Goring, a mansion in Sussex, England, which partially modelled on the villa.

== Activities ==
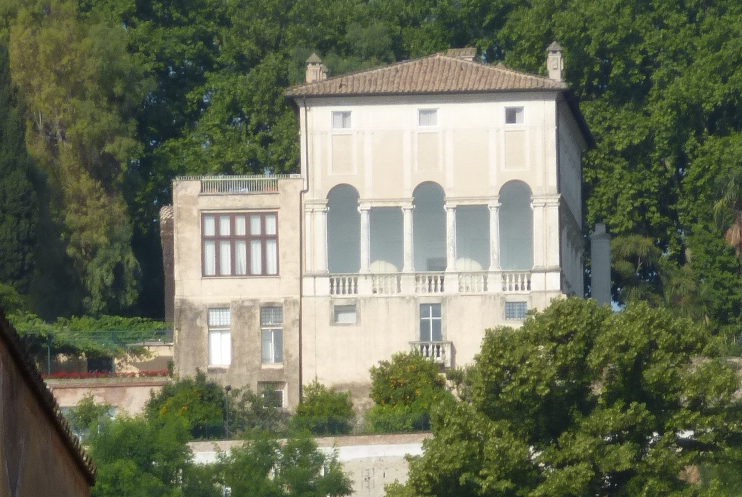
View of the Villa Lante from Trastevere

As well as academic research, the institute provides a supportive environment for experts in the visual arts, with an artist’s studio on the ground floor of Villa Lante.

== Directors ==
- Torsten Steinby, 1953–1955
- Henrik Zilliacus, 1956–1959
- Veikko Väänänen, 1959–1962
- Jaakko Suolahti, 1962–1965
- Patrick Bruun, 1965–1968
- Tuomo Pekkanen, 1970–1972
- Henrik Lilius, 1972–1976
- Heikki Solin, 1976–1979
- Eva Margareta Steinby, 1979–1982
- Veikko Litzen, 1982–1985
- Unto Paananen, 1986–1989
- Anne Helttula, 1989–1992
- Eva Margareta Steinby, 1992–1994
- Päivi Setälä, 1994–1997
- Christer Bruun, 1997–2000
- Christian Krötzl, 2000–2003
- Mika Kajava, 2003–2006
- Kaj Sandberg, 2006–2009
- Katariina Mustakallio, 2009–2013
- Tuomas Heikkilä, 2013–2017
- Arja Karivieri, 2017–2021
- Ria Berg, 2021–present

== Bibliography ==
- Ianiculum. Gianicolo. Storia, topografia, monumenti, leggende dall'antichità fino al rinascimento, ed. by Eva Margareta Steinby (1996)
- La Villa Lante al Gianicolo, ed. by Tancredi Carunchio and Simo Örma (2004)
