= Finnish Institute in the UK and Ireland =

Non-profit private foundation

- Suomen Britannian- ja Irlannin-instituutti
- Type: Non-profit, private foundation
- Director: Jaakko Nousiainen
- Affiliations: Finnish Cultural and Academic Institutes
- Website: fininst.uk

The Finnish Institute in the UK and Ireland (Finnish: Suomen Britannian- ja Irlannin-instituutti, Swedish: Finlandsinstitutet i Storbritannien och Irland), formerly the Finnish Institute in London (Suomen Lontoon-instituutti) is a non-profit, private foundation, funded principally by the Finnish Ministry of Education and Culture. It is part of the international network of 17 Finnish Cultural and Academic Institutes. It operates in the United Kingdom, Ireland and Finland. The Institute runs two programmes: Arts and Society. The Institute belongs to the Team Finland network that supports Finnish diplomacy, business and culture abroad. The institute is a member of EUNIC London, the network of EU member state cultural institutes.

== UK/Ireland ==
The Finnish Institute in the UK and Ireland is an expert on Finnish culture and society. The institute supports the internationalisation of Finnish contemporary art and helps artists, researchers and social and cultural actors to create international networks. It builds partnerships between Irish, British and Finnish actors and organisations. The Institute encourages interdisciplinary and transnational collaboration by creating networks and building new partnerships.

== History ==
The Finnish Institute in London was founded in 1991. In January 2021, the foundation changed its name to the Finnish Institute in the UK and Ireland.

=== Directors ===
- Eino Lyytinen 1991–1993
- Jaakko Rusama 1993–1996
- Henrik Stenius 1996–1999
- Panu Minkkinen 1999–2002
- Timo Valjakka 2002–2005
- Seppo Kimanen 2005–2008
- Raija Koli 2008–2013
- Susanna Pettersson 2013–2014
- Johanna Vakkari October 2014 – January 2015
- Pauliina Ståhlberg 2015–2018
- Emilie Gardberg 2018–2020
- Jaakko Nousiainen 2021–present
