= Turanian Society =

Former society founded by Tatars to unite Turkic peoples living in the Russian Empire

The Turanian Society (Turkish: Turan Cemiyeti, Tatar: Turan Cämğiäte, Hungarian: Turáni Társaság) was a society founded in 1839 by Tatars with the goal of uniting the various Turkic peoples living in the Russian Empire. The organisation is one of the earliest forerunners of modern Turanism and, in a more narrow sense, Pan-Turkism.

The name is derived from Turan, an ancient Persian name for the land to the East of Iran where many Turkic peoples live, as well as the goal of Turan, a united state for all Turkic peoples.

== Examples ==
During the latter part of the 19th century and the early 20th century, similar societies were founded in many other countries with claimed Turanian roots:

- The idea of a Hungarian Oriental Institute originated from Jenő Zichy. Unfortunately, this idea did not come true. Instead, a kind of lyceum was formed in 1910, called "Turáni Társaság" (The Hungarian Turan Society (also called The Hungarian Asiatic Society)). The Turan society concentrated on Turan as the geographic location where the ancestors of Hungarians might have lived.

"Turáni Társaság célja az egész turánság, vagyis a magyar nemzet és a velünk rokon többi európai és ázsiai népek kulturális és gazdasági előrehaladása, tömörülése, erősödése, úgymint az ázsiai kontinens földrajzi, néprajzi, gazdasági stb. kutatása múltban és jelenben. Politikai és felekezeti kérdések kizártak. Céljait a nem turáni népekkel egyetértve óhajtja elérni."

The scholars of the Turan society interpreted the ethnic and linguistic kinship and relations between Hungarians and the so-called Turanian peoples on the basis of the then prevailing Ural-Altaic linguistic theory. The Society arranged Turkish, Finnish and Japanese language courses. The Turan Society arranged and funded five expeditions into Asia till 1914.(The Mészáros-Milleker expedition, the Timkó expedition, the Milleker expedition, the Kovács-Holzwarth expedition, and the Sebők-Schutz expedition.) The Society held public lectures regularly. Lecturers included `Abdu'l-Bahá and Shuho Chiba.

- Turan Federation of Hungary, founded 1920, disbanded in 1923.
- Turanian National Alliance or Alliance of Turanian People (Tsuran Minzoku Doumei), founded in Japan in 1921 by Tartar immigrants.(forbidden in 1937 by Imperial law)

In 1914, in the context of World War I, a New Turan Society (Yeni Turan Cemiyet) was formed in Istanbul, Ottoman Empire and was supported by both Bolsheviks and the German Empire. This project, however, had a strong Islamist and Pan-Islamist agenda and was aimed also at non-Turanian Muslims of Central Asia.

== See also ==
- Turanism
- Pan-Turkism
- Hungarian Turanism
- Turan
- Turanid race
