= World Congress of Finno-Ugric Peoples =

Representative forum of Finno-Ugric and Samoyedic people

- logo
- Formation: March 24, 1927; April 30, 1991 (recreated)
- Type: NGO
- Purpose: Promotion of Finno-Ugric languages, cultures, and self-determination
- Location: Tallinn, Estonia
- Website: fennougria.ee

World Congress of Finno-Ugric Peoples (often shortened to Fenno-Ugria) is the representative forum of Finno-Ugric and Samoyedic peoples (i.e. Uralic peoples). The forum is not related to any government or political party. The goals of the forum is to "develop and protect national identity, cultures and languages of Finno-Ugric peoples, to promote cooperation between Finno-Ugric peoples, to discuss topical issues and to identify solutions, and to realise the right of Finno-Ugric peoples to self-determination in accordance with international norms and principles".

== Organization ==
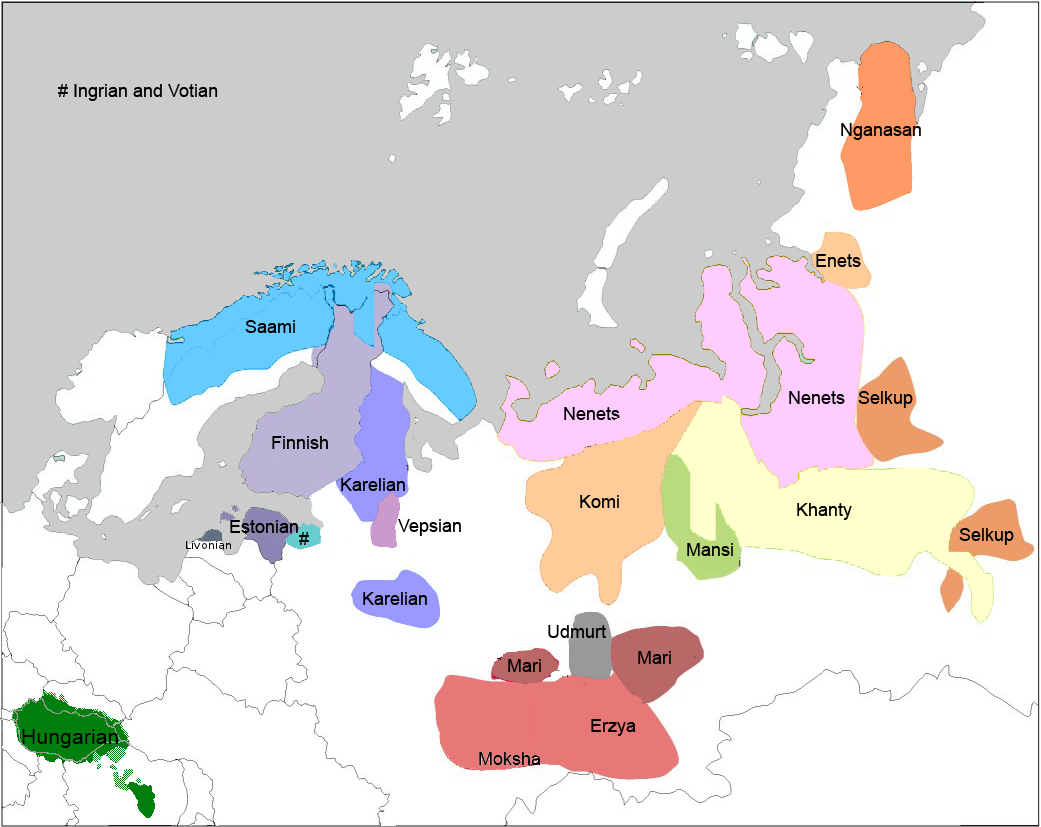
Distribution of Finno-Ugric and Samoyedic peoples

Although the congress itself is independently organized and run with no relation to any government or political party, the congress' forums are organized and run by the respective host nation, and as such are often used as diplomatic gatherings for the respective nations as member nations' presidents will be in attendance.

Member nations

- Estonia
- Finland
- Hungary

Represented peoples

- (Estonia) Estonians
- Erzya
- (Finland) Finns
- (Hungary) Hungarians
- Izhorians
- Karelians
- Khanty
- Mansi
- (Komi-Permyak Okrug) Komi-Permyak
- (Komi Republic) Komi-Zyrian
- Livonians
- Ludians
- (Mari El) Mari
- Mokshas
- (Sápmi) Sámi
- Samoyedic peoples
  - Enets
  - Nenets
  - Nganasans
  - Selkups
- Udmurt
- Vepsians
- Votians

Former member nations

- Russia - Withdrew in 2021

== History ==
=== Original (1927-1940) ===
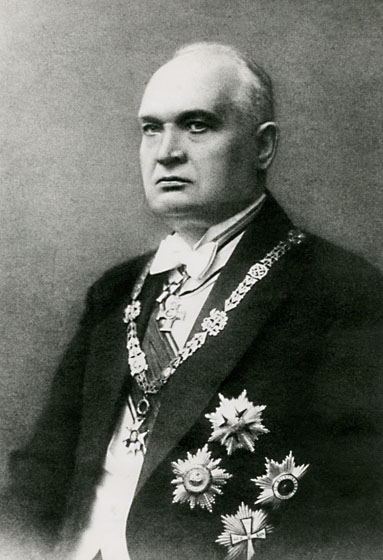
Konstantin Päts 1st President of Estonia Founding member of the original Congress' board and prominent supporter during his Presidency

The groundwork for the original World Congress of Finno-Ugric Peoples began in 1924 during the Second Finno-Ugric Educational Congress which decided that the nations of Finland, Estonia and Hungary must identify or establish organizations that will coordinate the work of Finno-Ugric states. The early movement was largely Estonian-centric, with the founding board named by the congress consisting of three Estonians: Konstantin Päts, Peeter Põld, and Gustav Ollik. The decision to form the World Congress of Finno-Urgic Peoples was made on March 30, 1926, with the organization's statutes being approved on March 24, 1927, and the first meeting being held on May 27, 1927 in Tallinn.

Fenno-Ugria's first annual report in 1928 outlined the organization's goal as representing Estonia in the Finno-Ugric cultural congress and advance the standing and well-being of Estonians abroad, contributing to the founding of the Association of Estonians Abroad (Välis-Eesti Ühing) which continues to exist in the modern day. As the congress developed, Finno-Ugric diaspora from Russia which was recovering from its Civil War flocked to Estonia with various stateless Finno-Ugric peoples joining the congress, which by 1936 had approximately 40 members. From 1928 to 1933 the organization published a quarterly journal, Eesti Hõim, edited by Villem Ernits, which was superseded by the Finno-Ugric yearbook which was published annually and edited by Alo Raun.

From 1936 to 1938 the congress organized meetings between representatives in Finland, Estonia, and Hungary to develop cultural working groups, standardized educational courses of Finnish and Hungarian languages, and celebration of Finno-Ugric peoples. At the fourth congress in 1931, the congress recognized the third Saturday in October as Finno-Ugric Day, during the first celebration of which, over 431 public meetings and speeches were held, with celebrations frequently being attended by high-ranking members of the Estonian government. By 1937 all three governments officially recognized the congress as an international body that regulates cultural cooperation between the three. Shortly before the outbreak of World War II the congress was preparing its sixth meeting in Budapest, for which, a Finno-Ugric anthem was developed and conducted, however, the meeting would be postponed and then canceled with the outbreak of hostilities.

With the outbreak of the war the Finno-Ugric congress was largely sidelined, with its last official duties being organizing medical aid to Finnish veterans from the Winter War and organizing summer camps for orphaned children. When the Soviets occupied Estonia starting on September 28, 1939, the Congress was forced to disband and many of its members were arrested and subsequently "disappeared" by Soviet officials and secret police. Its assets were transferred to Learned Estonian Society. The organization would continue to linger in Finland until the end of the Winter War.

=== Revival in 1991 ===
Despite Soviet efforts, Estonians continued to seek a unified Finno-Ugric cultural organization, and with their new status as members of the Soviet Union, began developing relations eastward. The University of Tartu became the cultural center of the Finno-Ugric world with representatives of eastern Finno-Ugric peoples studying at the school. Additionally, the Estonian Academy of Arts led by Kaljo Põllu and the Estonian National Museum led by Aleksei Peterson led expeditions into remote northern regions of the Union to study the Finno-Ugric peoples there and encourage cooperation. However, earlier efforts from the Congress became taboo, such as the use of the word "kindred" and "kindred people" which the Congress frequently used to describe all Finno-Ugric peoples.

In the late 1980s during Glasnost and Perestroika, various Estonian-based Finno-Ugric cultural, musical, theatrical, and youth organizations formed and during the dissolution of the Soviet Union these organizations recognized the need for a central governing body, as each group alone did not have the leadership necessary for a multi-national organization. As such, on April 19, 1991, the Estonian newspaper Noorte Hääl called for the re-establishment of the World Congress of Finno-Ugric Peoples and would be joined shortly after by the Estonian Uralic Society, Estonian Mari Society and Estonian Saami Society.

The meeting to restore the Congress was held on April 30, 1991 and was attended by 50 institutions, organizations, national societies and associations. At said meeting, Fenno-Ugria stated that they are the legal descendants of the older Congress with the purpose of "promoting the culture, education and science of Finno-Ugric and Samoyedic peoples.”

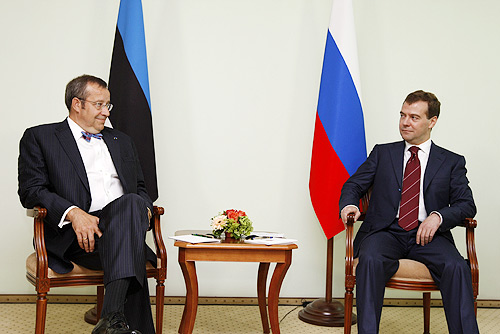
Estonian president Toomas Hendrik Ilves meeting with Russian president Dmitry Medvedev at the fifth forum in Khanty-Mansiysk

The Russian Federation had been a member of the Congress since its re-foundation, hosting the first modern congress in 1992, however, the Russian government's involvement in the organization led to controversy with other members. Namely, at the fifth forum in Khanty-Mansiysk where Estonian President Toomas Hendrik Ilves announced that the Finno-Ugric peoples of Russia have the right to self-determination and the right to form their own states within the Russian Federation. The Russian delegation rebuffed the statement, resulting in the entire Estonian delegation walking out. In response the Russian delegation issued the following statement:

“almost all the speeches of the delegates from Finland and Estonia we hear continuous criticism of our country” and there has been “a tendency to focus on the negative aspects of the life of the Finno-Ugric peoples of the Russian Federation”

The fifth forum had other controversies organized by the Russian government to mitigate the congress. Namely by ensuring there were not enough hotel rooms for all the delegates, and blocking the Mordovian delegation from attending. Estonian president Kersti Kaljulaid personally invited Russian president Vladimir Putin to attend the VIII forum during a state visit in 2019, which he skirted around. It would not be until April 24, 2021, when Russia withdrew from the congress.

== Forums ==
Locations and dates of the forums:

- I forum. Syktyvkar, Komi Republic, Russia. 1–3 December 1992
- II forum. Budapest, Hungary. 17–19 August 1996
- III forum. Helsinki, Finland. 10–13 December 2000
- IV forum. Tallinn, Estonia. 15–19 August 2004
- V forum. Khanty-Mansiisk, Russia. 27–30 June 2008
- VI forum. Siofok, Hungary. 5–7 September 2012
- VII forum. Lahti, Finland. 15–17 June 2016
- VIII forum. Tartu, Estonia. 16–18 June 2021
- IX forum's date and location has yet to be determined, having been tentatively scheduled for some time in 2024. As of January 2025, the congress has yet to take place.
