= Jaana Vasama =

Finnish politician and cultural personnel

Jaana Vasama (born in 1966) is a Finnish politician and cultural personnel.

From 2005 to 2009, Vasama was the head of Finnish Institute in Tallinn. Since 2012, she is the head of Tuglas Society.

In 2021, Vasama was awarded the Order of the Cross of Terra Mariana, IV Class.
