= List of Finnish singers =

This is a list of singers from Finland.

== A ==
- Saara Aalto
- Anneli Aarika-Szrok
- Pekka Aarnio
- Jonne Aaron
- Armi Aavikko
- Anna Abreu
- Aino Ackté
- Emmy Achté
- Pepe Ahlqvist
- Alexandra Ahnger
- Susan Aho
- Jarkko Ahola
- Jukka Ahti
- Siru Airistola
- Ilkka Alanko
- Ismo Alanko
- Mikko Alatalo
- Nikolai Alho
- ALMA
- Alfons Almi
- Nikke Ankara
- Marko Annala
- Markku Aro
- Koop Arponen
- Asa (a.k.a. Avain / Asa Masa)
- Ami Aspelund
- Monica Aspelund
- Sampsa Astala
- Aste
- Läjä Äijälä

== B ==
- Sammy Babitzin
- Mara Balls
- Ida Basilier-Magelssen
- Behm
- Benjamin
- Mercedes Bentso
- Kati Bergman
- Mathilda Berwald
- Bess
- Kimmo Blom
- Tuure Boelius
- Antti Boman
- Kim Borg
- Kristiina Brask
- Brädi
- Johannes Brotherus
- Kim Brown
- Teemu Brunila

== C ==
- Carita
- Cheek
- Chisu
- Mona Carita
- Jussi Chydenius
- Kaj Chydenius
- Cledos
- Jimi Constantine
- Cyan Kicks

== D ==
- Daco Junior
- Danny
- Johanna Debreczeni
- Diandra

== E ==
- Raymond Ebanks
- Samuli Edelmann
- Eevil Stöö
- Ida Ekman
- Elastinen
- Isac Elliot
- Kike Elomaa
- Emmi
- Emma Engdahl-Jägerskiöld
- Erin
- Anna Eriksson
- Eurocrack
- Evelina
- Ezkimo

== F ==
- Kim Floor
- Alma Fohström
- Elin Fohström
- Sara Forsberg
- Ina Forsman
- Elisa Frandin
- Frederik
- Fredi
- Freeman
- Janina Frostell

== G ==
- Mikael Gabriel
- The Gambit
- Gettomasa
- Irwin Goodman
- Hanna Granfelt
- Eino Grön
- Monica Groop
- Mäk Gälis

== H ==
- Kreeta Haapasalo
- Katherine Haataja
- Susanna Haavisto
- Samu Haber
- Anna Hagelstam
- Tommi Hakala
- Riikka Hakola
- Jussi Hakulinen
- Joel Hallikainen
- Tony Halme
- Sakari Halonen
- Pauli Hanhiniemi
- Anna Hanski
- Juha Harju
- Costello Hautamäki
- Hector
- Olga Heikkala
- Pekka Heino
- Heikki Hela
- Reino Helismaa
- Barbara Helsingius
- Kim Herold
- Mikko Herranen
- Marko Hietala
- Konsta Hietanen
- Hiili Hiilesmaa
- Tea Hiilloste
- Marko Hirsma
- HK119
- Vuokko Hovatta
- Maarit Hurmerinta
- Sanna-June Hyde
- Helka Hynninen
- Jorma Hynninen
- Jouni Hynynen
- Antony Hämäläinen
- Elias Hämäläinen

== I ==
- OG Ikonen
- Irina
- Islaja
- Iso H
- Soile Isokoski

== J ==
- Jenni Jaakkola
- Janita
- Janna
- Jannika B
- Taneli Jarva
- Jasmine
- Jippu
- Ilona Jokinen
- Vesa "Vesku" Jokinen
- Jonsu
- Juju
- Jukka Poika
- Julma-Henri
- Erkki Junkkarinen
- Helena Juntunen
- Juno
- Ilkka Jääskeläinen
- Pasi Jääskeläinen
- Jonna Järnefelt
- Maikki Järnefelt
- Maria Järvenhelmi
- Anna Järvinen
- Mika Järvinen

== K ==
- Jesse Kaikuranta
- Tony Kakko
- Ile Kallio
- Karoliina Kallio
- Aksel Kankaanranta
- Kana
- Tapani Kansa
- Mika Kares
- J. Karjalainen
- Pernilla Karlsson
- Therese Karlsson
- Karri Koira
- Kasmir
- Katri Helena
- Tuomas Kauhanen
- Leo Kauppi
- Anssi Kela
- Kikka
- Tuure Kilpeläinen
- Hilkka Kinnunen
- Laila Kinnunen
- Kirka
- Litku Klemetti
- Viktor Klimenko
- Ari Koivunen
- Brita Koivunen
- Paula Koivuniemi
- Kojo
- Pekka Kokko
- Taina Kokkonen
- Terhi Kokkonen
- Anu Komsi
- Kaija Koo
- Kaisa Korhonen
- Arja Koriseva
- Juho Koskelo
- Kerkko Koskinen
- Pasi Koskinen
- Timo Kotipelto
- Tom Krause
- Birgit Kronström
- Kube
- Kari Kuivalainen
- Mateli Magdalena Kuivalatar
- Kuningas Pähkinä
- Mira Kunnasluoto
- Jukka Kuoppamäki
- Sakari Kuosmanen
- Johanna Kurkela
- Sanni Kurkisuo
- Sanna Kurki-Suonio
- Alma Kuula
- Heikki Kuula
- Mauno Kuusisto
- Mikko Kuustonen
- Juha Kylmanen
- Käärijä
- Kaija Kärkinen

== L ==
- Alexi Laiho
- Ville Laihiala
- Olli-Pekka Laine
- Jussi Lampi
- Mandi Lampi
- Lau Nau
- Lea Laven
- Veikko Lavi
- Walfrid Lehto
- Matti Lehtinen
- Topi Lehtipuu
- Sauli Lehtonen
- Ville Leinonen
- Rosa Lemberg
- JP Leppäluoto
- Mikko Leppilampi
- Päivi Lepistö
- Juice Leskinen
- Tommi Liimatta
- Mats Lillhannus
- Mathias Lillmåns
- Helge Lindberg
- Dave Lindholm
- Olli Lindholm
- Lill Lindfors
- Peter Lindroos
- Petri Lindroos
- Kalle Lindroth
- Jyrki Linnankivi
- Vesa-Matti Loiri
- Jaakko Löytty
- Alma Lund
- Tamara Lund
- Amadeus Lundberg
- Mira Luoti
- Kaija Lustila
- Mika Luttinen
- Lxandra
- Erja Lyytinen
- Hildá Länsman
- Tommi Läntinen

== M ==
- Maarit
- Mad Ice
- Pave Maijanen
- Laura Malmivaara
- Malla Malmivaara
- Jaakko A. Malmivuo
- Eugen Malmstén
- Georg Malmstén
- Pirkko Mannola
- Eeki Mantere (a.k.a. Viktor Kalborrek)
- Ella Mäntynen
- Mariska
- Jarkko Martikainen
- Hans Martin
- Matti ja Teppo
- Anne Mattila
- Karita Mattila
- Pauliina May
- Andy McCoy
- Emilie Mechelin
- Sara Melleri
- Patrik Mennander
- Olivia Merilahti
- Juha Metsäperä
- Miisa
- Matthau Mikojan
- Pelle Miljoona
- Milana Misic
- Michael Monroe
- Muska
- Musta Barbaari
- Pate Mustajärvi
- Lasse Mårtenson
- Jari Mäenpää
- Taneli Mäkelä
- Jasmin Mäntylä

== N ==
- Narqath
- Pertti Neumann
- Jyrki Niskanen
- Nopsajalka
- Reino Nordin
- Siiri Nordin
- M. A. Numminen
- Sara Nunes
- Anne Nurmi
- Kari Nurmela
- Tuomari Nurmio
- Harri Nuutinen
- Petri Nygård
- Matti Nykänen
- Camilla Nylund
- Ann-Christine Nyström
- Laura Närhi
- Jules Näveri

== P ==
- Lilli Paasikivi
- Ernest Paananen
- Robin Packalen
- Mari Pajalahti
- Esa Pakarinen
- Hanna Pakarinen
- Paleface
- Christian Palin
- Tauno Palo
- Paperi T
- Paradise Oskar
- Pete Parkkonen
- Paska
- Päivi Paunu
- Leena Peisa
- Kari Peitsamo
- Eila Pellinen
- Matti Pellonpää
- Mia Permanto
- Maukka Perusjätkä
- Pirkka-Pekka Petelius
- Jaani Peuhu
- Lea Piltti
- Jonna Pirinen
- Ulla Pirttijärvi-Länsman
- PistePiste
- Tapani Plathan
- Kaija Pohjola
- Portion Boys
- Viivi Pumpanen
- Tomi Putaansuu
- Samuli Putro
- Anna Puu
- Pyhimys

== R ==
- Raappana
- Antti Railio
- Aarno Raninen
- Pasi Rantanen
- Mari Rantasila
- Tapio Rautavaara
- Aulikki Rautawaara
- Timo Rautiainen
- Pia Ravenna
- Jay Ray
- Redrama
- Sebastian Rejman
- Neea River
- Ronya
- RoopeK
- Vicky Rosti
- Marion Rung
- Seppo Ruohonen
- Jope Ruonansuu
- Ruudolf
- Kauko Röyhkä

== S ==
- Marko Saaresto
- Hannes Saari
- Sami Saari
- Wimme Saari
- Martti Saarinen
- Anneli Saaristo
- Sini Sabotage
- Arja Saijonmaa
- Tuomo Saikkonen
- Matti Salminen
- Simo Salminen
- Kyösti Salokorpi
- Hiski Salomaa
- Petteri Salomaa
- Sandhja
- Sipe Santapukki
- Ninja Sarasalo
- Johanna von Schoultz
- Emelie Sederholm
- Jutta Seppinen
- Pete Seppälä
- Sexmane
- Shatraug
- Krista Siegfrids
- Aleksi Sihvonen
- Sara Siipola
- Elina Siirala
- Jari Sillanpää
- Heikki Silvennoinen
- Seija Simola
- Laura Sippola
- Aki Sirkesalo
- Raimo Sirkiä
- Axl Smith
- Cristal Snow
- Sinikka Sokka
- Kyllikki Solanterä
- Rauli "Badding" Somerjoki
- Riki Sorsa
- Topi Sorsakoski
- Ville Sorvali
- Spekti
- Carola Standertskjöld
- Steen1
- Jan Stenfors
- Stig
- Pekka Streng
- Gösta Sundqvist
- Martti Suosalo
- Meiju Suvas
- Astrid Swan
- Jussi Sydänmaa

== T ==
- Annikki Tähti
- Reijo Taipale
- Taiska
- Tuuli Takala
- Martti Talvela
- J. Alfred Tanner
- Aatos Tapala
- Juha Tapio
- Kari Tapio
- Nina Tapio
- Mika Tauriainen
- Liisa Tavi
- Vera Telenius
- Irma Tervani
- Jonna Tervomaa
- Suvi Teräsniska
- Henry Theel
- Jean Theslöf
- Timo Tolkki
- Roni Tran Binh Trong
- Antti Tuisku
- Johanna Tukiainen
- Tuomo
- Tellu Turkka
- Kari Turunen
- Tarja Turunen
- Ex Tuuttiz
- H. Olliver Twisted
- Lauri Tähkä

== U ==
- Uniikki
- Olavi Uusivirta

== V ==
- Juha "Watt" Vainio
- Niko Valkeapää
- Nils-Aslak Valkeapää
- Ville Valo
- Jontte Valosaari
- Mato Valtonen
- Saija Varjus
- Jenni Vartiainen
- Ailamari Vehviläinen
- Paula Vesala
- Kaarle Viikate
- Pihla Viitala
- Erika Vikman
- Maija Vilkkumaa
- Capri Virkkunen
- Olavi Virta
- Jukka Virtanen
- Veltto Virtanen
- Voli
- Emppu Vuorinen
- Sauli Vuoti
- Laura Voutilainen

== W ==
- Leif Wager
- Mirel Wagner
- Jalo Walamies
- Martti Wallén
- Petri Walli
- Theodor Weissman
- Kristiina Wheeler
- Jani Wickholm
- Jann Wilde
- Jenny Wilhelms
- Pepe Willberg
- Tapio Wilska
- Toni Wirtanen
- Arttu Wiskari
- Windows95man
- Essi Wuorela

== Y ==
- Yasmine Yamajako
- Katri Ylander
- Kirsi Ylijoki
- Lauri Ylönen
- A. W. Yrjänä

== Z ==
- Felix Zenger
- Sofia Zida

== Å ==
- Nina Åström

== See also ==
- List of bands from Finland
- List of Finnish musicians
- List of Finnish jazz musicians
