= Kaija =

Female given name

Kaija is a contemporary feminine personal name thought to have arisen as a Finnic variant of the name Katrin, or alternatively from Katariina.

Among the people who share this name are:

- Kaija Aarikka (1929–2014), Finnish designer
- Kaija Juurikkala (b. 1959), a Finnish film director and screenwriter
- Kaija Kärkinen (b. 1962), a Finnish singer and actress
- Kaija Koo (b. 1962 as Kaija Kokkola), a Finnish singer
- Kaija Lustila (b. 1965), a Finnish singer
- Kaija Mustonen (b. 1941), a Finnish skater
- Kaija Pohjola (b. 1951), a Finnish singer
- Kaija Saariaho née Laakkonen (1952–2023), a Finnish composer
- Kaija Salopuro (b. 1938), Finnish footballer
- Kaija Silvennoinen (b. 1954), a Finnish skier
- Kaija Siren née Tuominen (1920–2001), a Finnish architect
- Kaija Udras (b. 1986), an Estonian skier

== Notes ==
=== General references ===
- Campbell, Lyle (1998), Historical linguistics: an introduction (Google Books, Preview format) (2 ed.), Massachusetts, United States: MIT Press, ISBN 978-0-262-53267-9
