= Debreczeni =

Debreczeni is a surname. Notable people with the surname include:

- Jack Debreczeni (born 1993), Australian rugby player
- Johanna Debreczeni (born 1980), Finnish singer
- József Debreczeni (1905–1978), Hungarian writer and translator
