= Vehviläinen =

Vehviläinen is a Finnish surname. Notable people with the surname include:

- Ailamari Vehviläinen (born 1977), Finnish singer
- Anu Vehviläinen (born 1963), Finnish politician
- Ville Vehviläinen, Finnish musician
