= Theslof =

Theslof or Theslöf is a surname. Notable people with the surname include:

- Jean Theslöf (1884–1966), Finnish sports shooter and singer
- Nick Theslof (born 1975), American soccer manager, coach, and scout
