= Mika Järvinen =

Mika Järvinen may refer to:

- Mika Järvinen (ice hockey)
- Mika Järvinen (musician)
