= Saija =

Saija is a surname and a feminine given name used in Finland. Notable people with the name include:

- Saija Tarkki (born 1982), Finnish ice hockey player
- Saija Varjus (born 1965), Finnish musician
