= Nuutinen =

Nuutinen is a Finnish surname. Notable people with the surname include:

- Emma Nuutinen (born 1996), Finnish ice hockey player
- Harri Nuutinen (born 1962), Finnish singer
- Matti Nuutinen (born 1990), Finnish basketball player
- Mikko Nuutinen (born 1990), Finnish ice hockey player
- Sofia Nuutinen (born 2002), Finnish ice hockey player
