= Nurmela =

Nurmela is a Finnish surname. Notable people with the surname include:

- Holger Nurmela (1920–2005), Swedish ice hockey player
- Kari Nurmela (1930–1984), Finnish opera singer
- Mika Nurmela (born 1971). Finnish footballer
- Tapio Nurmela (born 1975), Finnish Nordic combined skier
- Tauno Kalervo Nurmela (1907–1985), Finnish academic
  - 1696 Nurmela, asteroid, named after Tauno Kalervo Nurmela
- Sulo Nurmela (1908–1999), Finnish cross-country skier
