= Ailamari Vehviläinen =

Finnish singer (born 1977)

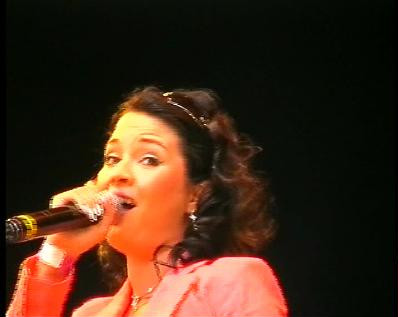
Ailamari Vehviläinen at the 2005 Tangomarkkinat

Ailamari Vehviläinen (born 20 April 1977 in Jyväskylä, Finland) is a Finnish singer. She first came to fame as a tango singer; she extended her repertoire to include evergreens, Finnish pop, musical theatre, and sacred music; but after what was described as one of the most disgraceful episodes to besmirch Finnish television (Ilkka, 23 July 2005), she has disappeared from the public gaze.

Ailamari first came to the attention of the public in May 2003, when she appeared on the televised Tangomarkkinat semi-final which was held in Raisio, but she was not selected for the finals. She was more successful in 2004, when she was selected for the Seinäjoki finals and became Tango Princess. She reached the finals again the following year, but fell foul of a change in the rules.

From the twelve competitors, the judges chose three men and three women, whose names were announced on TV. The viewers had rung in to elect their own favourites, who would be guaranteed a place in the final. Their male favourite was one of the judges' three; so it made no difference. But they chose a fourth woman, so one of the judges' three was dropped; and the unlucky one was Ailamari, who was ejected from the finals seconds after being told she had a place.

This drew protests from as far away as the UK: "to give her a place in the final and immediately afterwards snatch it away was dishonourable, unjust, heartless and cruel . . . the purpose of the Tangomarkkinat is to find the best interpreter of tango. Abuse of the competitors is not the point. It isn't I'm a Celebrity... Get Me Out of Here!." (Source: Ilkka, 23 July 2005)

Susanna Gärdström, a fellow finalist at the 2004 Tangomarkkinat, said: "It is not right to humiliate competitors for the sake of TV drama . . . it reduces the singing competition to the level of reality TV." (Source: Hymy, 1 September 2005)

Ailamari returned to the Tangomarkkinat in 2006, not to compete, but to take part in the show Valkokangas tanssi ja soi (The silver screen dances and plays) along with Mira Kunnasluoto, Erkki Räsänen, and Rami Rafael; and in a church concert, where she sang Jerusalem (not the unofficial English national anthem by William Blake).

Ailamari returned to the Tangomarkkinat in 2016, reaching the second round of the finals before being eliminated. The eventual winner was Erika Vikman. (Source: Ilkka, 10 July 2016)

== Discography ==
Ailamari contributes one track on each of the following collections:

- Kunikaalliset 2004 – Tangomarkkinat 17
- Kunikaalliset 2005 – Tangomarkkinat 18

== Awards ==
- Tango Princess 2004

== Sources ==
- Tango Illusion 2/2004
- Tango Illusion 2/2005
- Ilkka, 7–12 July 2004
- Ilkka, 6–11 July 2005
