= Johanna Debreczeni =

Finnish singer

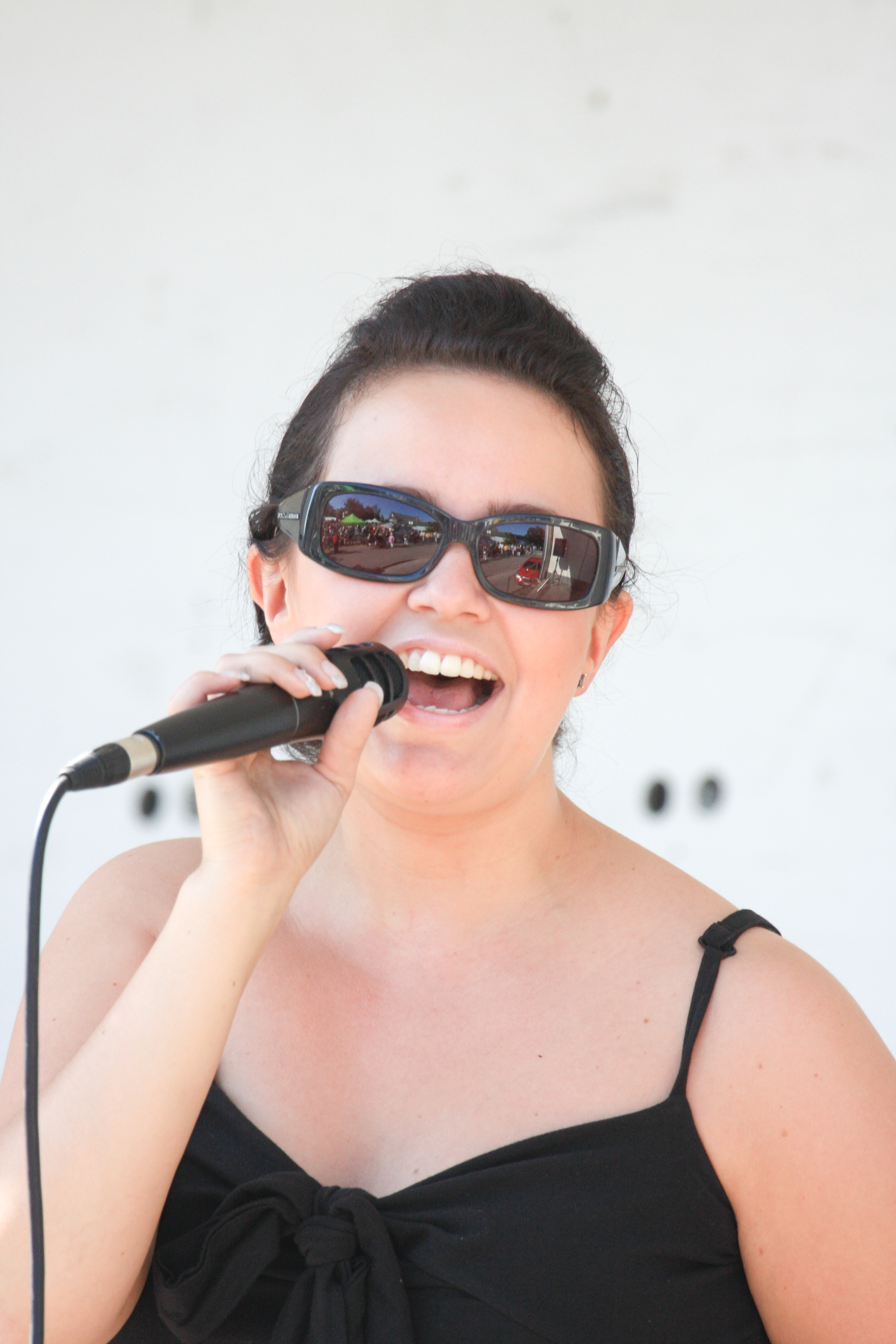
Johanna Debreczeni at Sauvo

Johanna Debreczeni (pronounced Debra Chaney) born 28 April 1980 in Tampere, Finland) is a Finnish singer. She began her career as a tango singer, but now her repertoire also includes evergreens and Finnish pop.

She is the only child of her family, her father being the Hungarian musician Gabriel Debreczeni. Her first major public appearance was in the musical Grease, at the Tampere Music Theatre. She entered the Tangomarkkinat competition three times, reaching the finals in 2002, only the semi-finals in 2003, and becoming Tango Queen in 2004.

The 1998 Tango King Jouni Keronen is her cousin and they often sing together, particularly under the name of Tango Primo, specialising in Finnish tangos in the Argentine style.

She was part of 2010 Tango King Marko Maunuksela's backing group along with Hanna Talikainen (Tango Queen 2008); Esa Nummela (Tango Prince 2000); and Suvi Karjula (who under the old rules would have been Tango Queen 2010, but is now a mere runner-up) in his entry "Synkän maan tango" (Tango of the Land of Melancholy) for the 2011 Eurovision Song Contest. It was not in fact selected by the Finnish TV viewing public.

== Performances and competitions ==
- 1997–1998 – Grease, Tampere Music Theatre
- 1997–1998 – Tanssiva Savoy, Tampere Music Theatre
- 1998 – Gold and Silver, Tampere Music Theatre
- 1999 – White Christmas, Tampere Music Theatre
- 2002 – Suomen Tähti finals
- 2002 – Tangomarkkinat finals
- 2002–2004 Sinitaivas concert
- 2003 – Tangomarkkinat semi-finals
- 2003 – Valkokankaan suosikit music show (Viking Line)
- 2003–2004 – Ilta Välimerellä music show (Viking Line)
- 2004 – Tango Queen
- 2004 – White Christmas concert tour
- 2005 – Valentine's Day concert
- 2005 – Suomifilmin helmet music show (Viking line)
- 2006 – Mr. Finland finals, judge
- 2006 – Winter Wonderland music show (Viking line)
- 2007 – Joulun kosketus (Christmas church concert)
- 2009 – Cumbre se Mundial tango festival, Bariloche, Argentina
- 2009–2010 – Onnen Kerjäläiset (musical)
- 2010 – Lähtekäämme metsään (children's concert)
- 2010 – Lumitango, Tampere
- 2011 – Eurovision selection finals (with Marko Maunuksela and others as above)
- 2011 – Lumitango, Tampere

== Discography ==
=== Albums ===
- 2005 – Parempaa
- 2008 – Lanteet kertovat sen

=== Singles ===
- 2004 – Parempaa
- 2004 – Ikävä jää
- 2005 – Nimi / Isä
- 2006 – Soittorasia (with Pekka Nebelung)
- 2010 – Lähtekäämme metsään (children's)
- 2011 – Synkän maan tango (with Marko Maunuksela and others as above)
- 2011 – Teemme toisemme paremmiksi

=== Radio singles ===
- 2006 – En kuole kyyneliin
- 2007 – Lanteet kertovat sen
- 2008 – Saat katsoo muttet koskettaa

=== Compilations with other artists ===
- 2002 – Tangomarkkinat 15
- 2004 – Tangomarkkinat 17
- 2004 – Hittiparaati 9
- 2005 – Tähtitaivas 8
- 2005 – Kuninkaallista iskelmää 20 vuotta
- 2005 – Tanssisuosikit – 40 tanssihittiä
- 2005 – Tangomarkkinat 18
- 2005 – Joulun tähtitaivas 2 (Christmas)
- 2006 – Iskelmä 5
- 2008 – Iskelmä 9
