= Tango on intohimoni =

1998 novel by M. A. Numminen

- First edition
- Author: M. A. Numminen
- Original title: Tango on intohimoni
- Language: Finnish
- Genre: Novel
- Publisher: Schilds
- Publication date: 1998
- Publication place: Finland
- Media type: Print
- Pages: 348 pp
- ISBN: 951-50-0918-9
- OCLC: 245738544

Tango on intohimoni (or Tango is my Passion) is a novel about Finnish tango written by M. A. Numminen. It features Virtanen, who is obsessed with the Finnish tango, and is interspersed with a history of the Finnish tango.

== Plot summary ==
"Many people ask what the meaning of life is. I know: it's tango." So says Virtanen, the hero of Tango on intohimoni, or Tango is my Passion, the definitive Finnish tango novel. Virtanen is a tango obsessive, with an encyclopaedic knowledge of the subject, which he insists on sharing with everybody he meets. He goes dancing every day in the various dance halls of Helsinki and sometimes Turku, but he only dances the tangos.

But Virtanen also has principles. At the age of 15 he had read that Plato recommends 24 as the ideal age for sexual intercourse for women, and 35 for men. If Virtanen can hold on to his virginity until the age of 36, he will have beaten the old fraud. But this is difficult for someone with such a passion for tango: "My penis rises and interferes with the dance. So, immediately after the dance, I hasten into the woods, break a handful of twigs off a birch tree, and punish my penis with many sharp little blows. The chastisement makes it calm down, and I can then go and invite a new girl onto the floor."(page 8) Virtanen manages to avoid the blandishments of the various women he meets in the Helsinki hot spots, but when he falls in love with Anja his troubles really start.

Interspersed with Virtanen's adventures is a history of Finnish tango, sometimes given by Virtanen himself, and sometimes by an anonymous third person voice, identified by a different typeface. Written by the Finnish bandleader M.A. Numminen, Tango on intohimoni has been translated into German, Swedish, and Italian; but there is no official English translation.

== Sources ==
- http://www.ma-numminen.net/eng/books.shtml
- http://www.taskukirja.fi/index.php?trg=book&id=294&ord=&ofs=30&q=
- http://www.musicalnews.com/articolo.php?codice=7809&sz=6
