= Sauli Lehtonen =

Finnish singer

- Born: Sauli Tapani Lehtonen; 10 April 1975; Jyväskylä, Finland
- Died: 9 September 1995 (aged 20) Helsinki, Finland
- Genre: Finnish tango
- Years active: 1994–1995
- Label: MTV Musiikki

Sauli Tapani Lehtonen (10 April 1975 in Jyväskylä, Finland – 9 September 1995 in Helsinki, Finland) was a Finnish tango singer.

== Biography ==
In 1994, he was crowned the tenth Tango King when he won a Finnish tango competition Tangomarkkinat. On 8 September 1995 Lehtonen and his father, who was driving the car, hit a moose in Sipoo. Lehtonen died in the Töölö Hospital in Helsinki in the early morning of 9 September 1995.

Lehtonen was well known for the way he kept his eyes closed when he was singing.
