= Kaija Pohjola =

Finnish singer (born 1951)

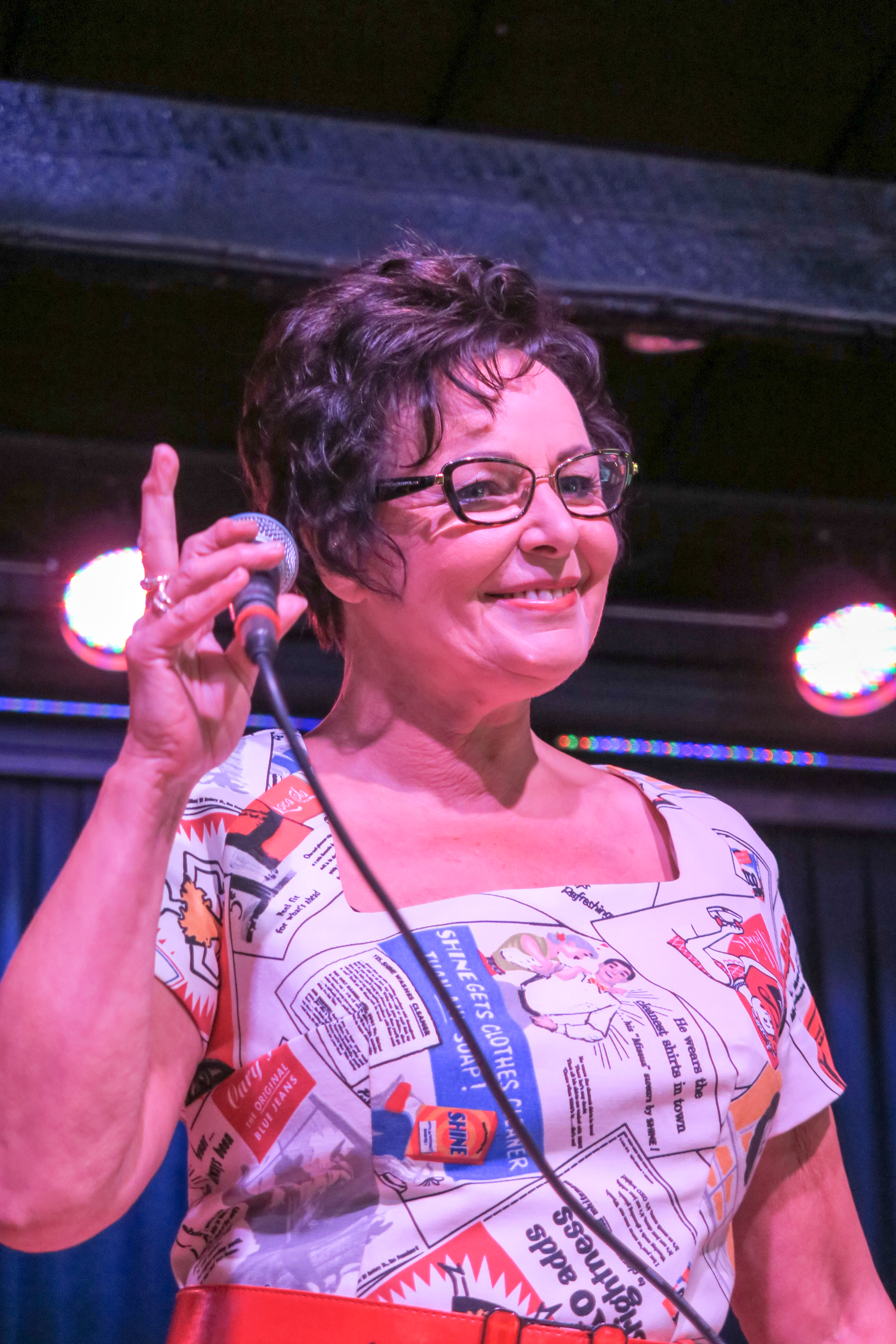
Kaija Pohjola

Kaija Pohjola (born 26 September 1951 in Kuopio, Finland) is a Finnish singer. She first came to fame as a tango singer; now her repertoire includes evergreens and Finnish pop.

== Biography ==
Kaija Pohjola says of her early life:

- "I have three brothers. I was interested in cars, guns, and other boyish things. I was good at climbing trees, but I didn't dare come down till someone came to get me. I didn't learn girls' games till I went to school."
- "I have sung all my life. Mother tells of an occasion we were eating in a restaurant where there was live music a lunchtime. I whispered to Mother that I would like to go and sing. She gave me permission, and I, a little chubby four year old girl, went onto the stage and curtseyed. I sang the first song I learned, Oskar Merikanto's Laula tyttö. Then I curtseyed again and returned to the table. It was my first performance before the public." (Nyland, p. 74)

In her teens she took part in singing competitions. In 1968 she won competitions in Kausala and Kouvola. (Latva & Tuunainen, p 345)

In 1969 she won the Tähtijahti (starsearch) competition organised by a newspaper (the sources differ about the name of the paper: according to Nyman (p 74) it is Suosikki; Latva & Tuunainen (p 345) say Intro). Her song was Dong Hoin tyttö, composed by Juha Vainio, and is included in the LP Tähtijahti (Latva & Tuunainen, p 345). This number was reissued on the 2013 album, Tosirakkautta.

In the early 1970s she used the stage name Maarit, but reverted to her own name to avoid confusion with Maarit Hurmerinta, who also recorded under the name Maarit. (Latva & Tuunainen, p 345). About this time (the sources do not give an exact date) she got married and singing was put on hold in favour of raising a family.

In 1990 her children Petri and Paula had reached the ages of 12 and 9, and Kaija felt able to compete in the Tangomarkkinat. She became Tango Princess in spite of poor conditions in the competition hall:

"The evening of the finals was sweltering hot and inside the television lights brought the temperature to over 50 degrees. We sat in the front of the auditorium and awaited our turns. When I climbed on to the stage I was nearly passing out." (Nyland, p. 75)

The following year she tried again and became Tango Queen at the age of 40. In 1992 she took part in the Eurovision Song Contest selection programme with Rexi (real name Raimo Kero) with Rexi's own composition Ruskaa näin sinun silmissäs. There was strong competition from Arja Koriseva with Huomiseen and Sonja Lumme with Rakkauden bulevardi, but the song eventually chosen was the weak Yamma-yamma by Pave Maijanen, which came 23rd in the Eurovision itself. The winner was Linda Martin with Why Me?, composed by previous winner Johnny Logan under the name Séan Sherrard. (source:Latva & Tuunainen, pp 346, 368; Murtomäki, p 169)

Since 1991 she has appeared every year at the Tangomarkkinat, and in 2003 issued a DVD devoted entirely to tangos.

== Discography ==
- 1969 Tähtijahti (one track only) (LP)
- 1990 Tangomarkkinat 3 (one track only) (LP)
- 1991 Tangokunings ja -kuningatar (with Jaska Mäkynen)(LP)
- 1992 Kultaa kuutamo loi
- 1994 Nyt tanssimaan
- 1995 Tatuoitu ruusu
- 2000 Lasiset lauseet
- 2003 Tangokuningatar
- 2013 Tosirakkautta (compilation)

== Reissues ==
- 1998 Parhaat

== DVD ==
- 2003 Tangokuningatar

== Awards ==
- 1990 Tango Princess
- 1991 Tango Queen

== Sources ==
- Marja Nyman, Tangokuninkaalliset, Revontuli 2002, ISBN 952-5170-27-6
- Tony Latva and Petri Tuunainen, Iskelmän tähtitaivas, WSOY 2004, ISBN 951-0-27817-3
- Asko Murtomäki, Finland 12 points!, Teos 2007, ISBN 978-951-851-106-2
