= Mira Kunnasluoto =

Finnish singer

Mira Johanna Kunnasluoto (born 13 January 1974 in Elimäki, Finland) is a Finnish singer. She first came to fame as a tango singer; now her repertoire includes evergreens and Finnish pop.

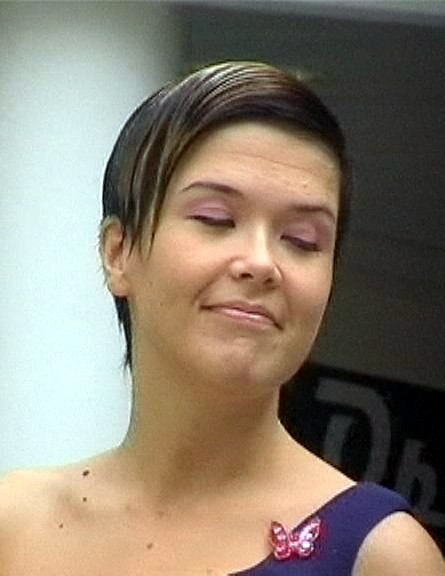
Mira Kunnasluoto at the 2002 Tangomarkkinat

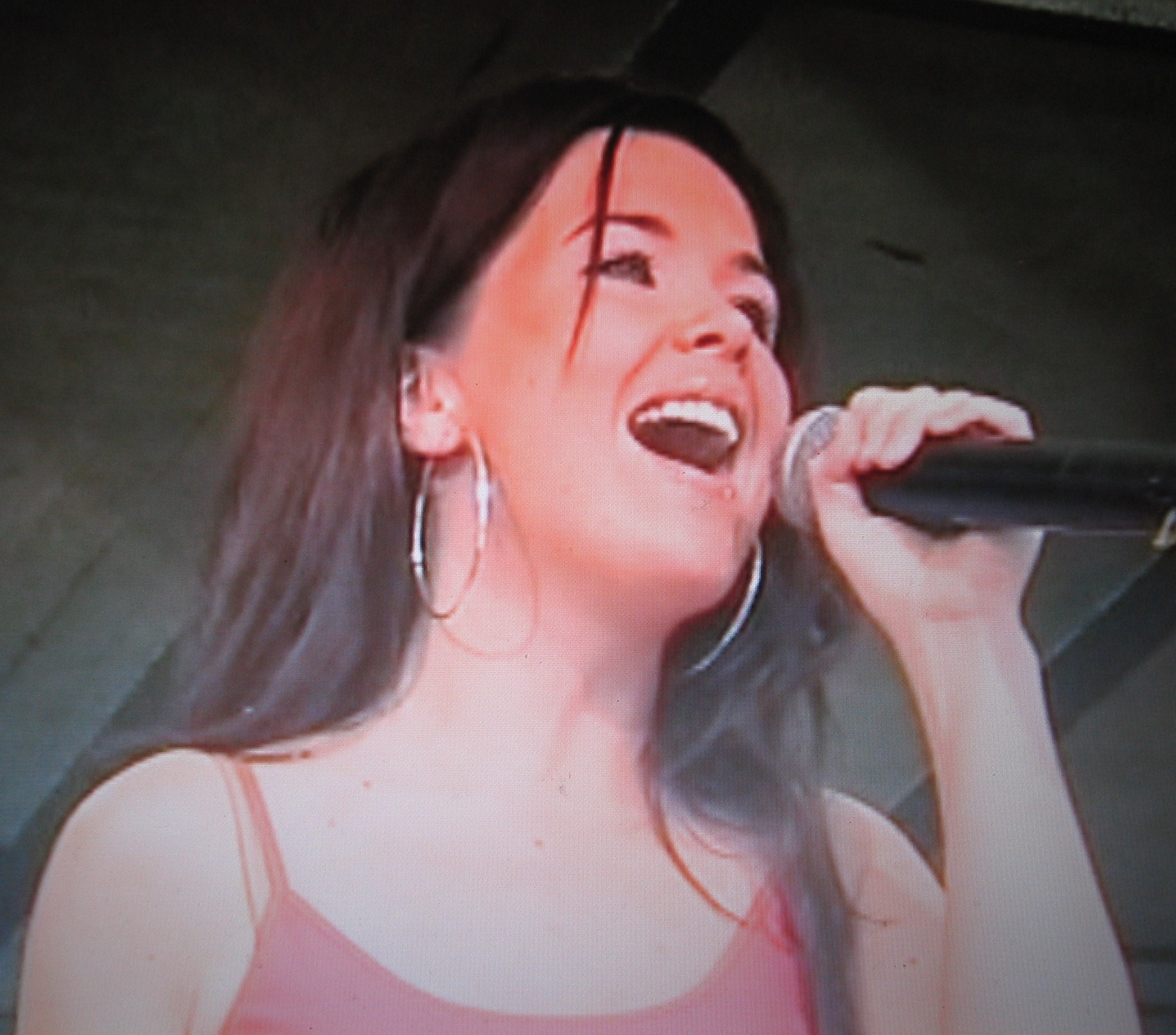
Mira Kunnasluoto at the 2004 Tangomarkkinat

== Biography ==
She is the second youngest of four sisters. Her parents divorced when she was only 3. Young, she played guitar and sang at home. Arja Koriseva and Eija Kantola were her favorite Finnish singers, and Kim Wilde, Paul Young, and Madonna her favorite international singers.

After leaving school, she attended Kuusankoski nursing college, but dropped out after six months. She started catering college but also dropped out. She trained briefly as a florist, abandoned it after four months, and started to participate in singing competitions. In 1999, she took part in the Radio Stars competition, the Stage Stars, and the Finland Stars. Modest success in these encouraged her to try for the prestigious Tangomarkkinat.

She became Tango Queen in 2000, since when she has been a respected and popular singer in Finland. A high point in her career was a tour to the US and Canada with Eino Grön.

She then joined the Pentecostal gospel.

== Personal life ==
She married at the age of 18 and had two children, Lassi and Janne, but the marriage did not last.

== Discography ==
- 2000: Mira Kunnasluoto
- 2005: Riisuttu
- 2015: Näytä värisi
- 2015: Jouluyö
- 2017: Sinuun kun turvaan

== Awards ==
- 2000 Tango Queen

== Sources ==
- Marja Nyman, Tangokuninkaalliset, Revontuli 2002, ISBN 952-5170-27-6
- Tony Latva and Petri Tuunainen, Iskelmän tähtitaivas, WSOY 2004, ISBN 951-0-27817-3
