= Jalo Walamies =

Finnish musician and songwriter (born 1975)

- Birth name: Jalo Walamies; Jyväskylä, Finland
- Born: June 1, 1975 (age 49)
- Genres: Folk, country, '70s rock
- Occupation(s): Singer and musician
- Years active: 2004-present
- Website: http://www.jalowalamies.com/

Jalo Walamies (born June 1, 1975 in Jyväskylä, Finland) is a Finnish musician and songwriter. Walamies' music has numerous influences, including country, folk, 1970s rock, and artists such Tom Petty, Bob Dylan, Roger McGuinn, Jeff Lynne and Francis Rossi. His lyrical influences include Kari Peitsamo, J. Karjalainen, Pauli Hanhiniemi, Juice Leskinen and Edu Kettunen. Walamies' third studio album, Tuolla jossain kaukana, was released in 2007.

== Discography ==
- "Kaksi Sydäntä" (single) (2004)
- Etsimässä Unelmaa (album) (2005)
- Elämä on pieni (album) (2006)
- Tuolla jossain kaukana (album) (2007)

=== Music videos ===
- Kaksi Sydäntä (2004), directed by Sakari Lehtinen
