= Mauno Kuusisto =

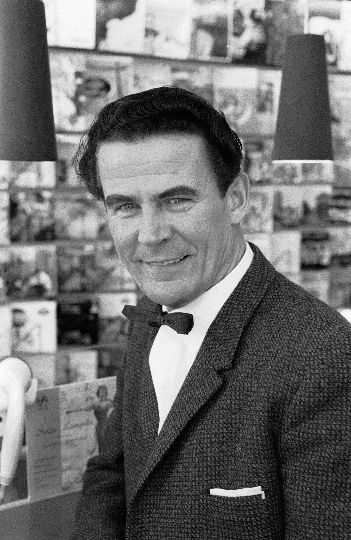
Mauno Kuusisto in 1960.

Mauno Arnold Kuusisto (3 November 1917, Tampere — 29 August 2010, Tampere) was a popular Finnish vocalist and opera singer (tenor), as well as an actor.

== Early life ==
Mauno Arnold Kuusisto was born on 3 November 1917 in Tampere, Finland. Kuusisto was orphaned when he was just a few weeks old and was subsequently taken in by his grandparents who also lived in Tampere. He resided in a Finlayson workers' house during the remainder of his life as a child and then by the time he was a teenager he began to work for the company.

Kuusisto completed his schooling at the Pyynikin old vocational school. However, he was offered a place as a model carpenter at Finlayson which he accepted and began to work before the Winter War. He worked for Finlayson until the year of 1957.

== Career ==
Mauno Kuusisto initially participated in Finlayson's musical activities. Since then, Kuusisto began to study singing and visited choirs and quartets in Tampere. He had his first concert in 1952 in Tampere. In the Tampere Opera he sang a total of twenty-one operas and operetta roles. Tampere orchestra leader Eero Kosonen gladly paid him for these roles. Kusisto also visited the Finnish National Opera in Helsinki, Finland, twice. Kuusisto appeared as part of the cast in these operas mostly between 1952–1968.

Kuusisto became a familiar radio personality in the 1950s. In 1930 Rudolfo Falvon composed the song "Kertokaa se hänelle" ("Tell it to her") which Kuusisto sang in 1959. As a result, Kuusisto rose to popularity among audiences and "Tell it to her" reached gold record sales in Finland. With 47,000 initial sales, "Tell it to her" is Finland's best-selling domestic single.

== Discography ==
=== Albums ===
- Kertokaa se hänelle (1965, Discophon)
- Hengellisiä lauluja (1967, Discophon)
- Mauno Kuusisto laulaa (1967, Finnlevy)
- Lauluja Sinulle (1969, Discophon)
- Elämäni on lauluni (1971, Discophon)
- Sunnuntai (1978, Discophon)
- Tulin onneni yrttitarhaan (1980, Discophon)
- Sua kohti Herrani (1980, Discophon)
- Joulumuisto (1980, Discophon)

=== Collections ===
- Kauneimmat lauluni (1979, Discophon)
- Unohtumattomat (1992, Finnlevy)
- Joulun tähtihetkiä (1992, Finlandia Records)
- 20 suosikkia – Lokki (Fazer Records, 1995)
- 20 suosikkia – On jossakin (Warner Music Finland, 1999)
- 20 suosikkia − Oi muistatko vielä sen virren (Warner Music Finland, [2002)

== Filmography ==
- Kertokaa se hänelle... (1961) (dir. Åke Lindman)
- Kun tuomi kukkii (1962) (dir. Åke Lindman)
