= Mäk Gälis =

Finnish rapper

Joonas Aleksi Galle, better known by his stage name Mäk Gälis (born in 1989), is a Finnish rap artist. He released his first album Lähi-öissä on 26 April 2013 on WEA / Warner Music Finland. His song "Saa föraa" was used for the compilation album on the occasion of the 2013 International Ice Hockey Federation World Championship. noting that Mäk Gälis was a junior ice hockey player himself and part of the E-89 national side.

== Personal life ==
Gälis is the younger brother of Ville Galle of the famous Finnish duo JVG. He became known after appearing in a JVG music video.

He left his brothers label PME Records soon after his first studio album and took a five year hiatus without any kind of message or explanation to the public. Finally in 2019, Ville Galle revealed that he and Gälis have not been on speaking terms for six years.

== Discography ==
=== Albums ===
| Year | Album | Peak position |
| Year | Album | FIN |
|---|---|---|
| 2013 | Lähi-öissä | 32 |
