= Mad Ice =

Ugandan singer

- Born: Ahmed Mohamed Kakoyi; 8 October 1980 (age 45); Masaka, Uganda
- Origin: Ugandan artist based in Tanzania and later in Finland
- Genres: Raggamuffin, Afro-pop, Afro-soul, world music
- Occupations: Singer, songwriter, musician
- Instruments: Vocals, guitar
- Years active: 1999–present
- Labels: Kokwa Records, Tanzania; Mwamba Records, Finland; Edel Records, Finland; Recordhouse Music, Finland
- Website: www.madice.net

Ahmed Mohamed Kakoyi (born in Masaka, Uganda on 8 October 1980) better known by his stage name Mad Ice is a Ugandan singer and songwriter of Raggamuffin and at a later stage with Afro-pop and Afro-soul music. He gained fame in Uganda, Tanzania and throughout Eastern Africa, later settling in Finland and developing a distinct world music career still singing mostly in Swahili and Luganda with some additional lyrics in English. Considered a world music performer from East Africa, he has appeared in jazz, world music, pop, rock and fusion festivals and has released studio albums Baby Gal, Mad Ice and Maneno and EP Maisha.

== Career ==
Mad Ice was born on 8 October 1980 in Masaka and moved to Kampala when he was one year old. At age 7, his family moved to Tanzania coming back to Uganda when he was ten. His first experiences were with Dancehall/Ragga Muffin music in Uganda starting in 1995. In 1999 as a young 19-year-old, he relocated back to Mwanza, Tanzania and eventually to Dar es Salaam to pursue better opportunities as an MC and performer on various shows and venues. In his formative years in Tanzania, he was trained and supervised by Canadian musician Corry Morriarty and Tanzanian musician Richard Mloka and learned to play guitar. Influenced mostly by mid 1990s Caribbean sounds of Chaka Demus & Pliers, Shaggy amongst others, his first recording was "Wanadamu" that found airplay time on some stations and was a hit in Tanzania. Encouraged by its success, he released the follow-up single "Baby Gal" that exploded throughout East Africa. His debut album Baby Gal was published in 2003 with some further success. He says in an interview: "I was born in Uganda, but I spent some years in Tanzania. There my career as a singer really started. Since I sang mostly in Swahili, the majority has always taken me as a Tanzanian artist". The 2003 album was produced in Tanzania by Finnish record producer based in Tanzania called Miikka "Mwamba" Kari. It included soca beats, African rhythms, with touches of Ragga, Soul and Pop, and songs sung in Swahili, Luganda and English.

In 2004, when Miikka Mwamba Kari returned to Finland, he invited Mad Ice to Finland where he signed a three-year contract with Miikka's label Mwamba Records. Residing in Helsinki and collaborating with him, he worked on a follow-up self-titled Mad Ice recorded in Firelight Studios in 2005 in Finland and released on Mwamba Records with the Finnish Edel Records label for distribution. Miikka Mwamba Kari has also produced for other African artists like Inspector Haroun, Lady Jaydee, Chegge, Solid Ground Family, Dknob. Mad Ice toured throughout Europe as part of the "Scandinavian world music scene" promoting his new album. His music was played by many European radio stations and at festivals. The new album included a remake of a number of good songs from Baby Gal including his successful single "Baby Gal" as well as a new single release "Wange" that also charted on various East African charts reaching number 1 in both Uganda and Tanzania in 2005–2006. Mad Ice used the opportunity to form a collective that included Ziggy Dee and Quina Lad. The collective called "The Comrades" was to promote Ugandan artists based in Tanzania. "Wange" was also picked up by Finnish stations, particularly Power FM making him more famous in Finland.

In 2006, he had success with his single "Ni Wewe" and took part in 2007 in the International Songwriting Competition (ISC) making it to the semi-finals in the world music category with his song "Nionyeshe Njia". He has toured East African countries to maintain his fan base despite his residency in Finland and writes almost all his songs using Swahili and Luganda most of the time.

The following album was Maneno in 2007 and included many of his successes in recent years like "Wange", "Malaika" and "Nionyeshe njia" and was released on the Finnish Recordhouse Music label and MadStylee.com online.

In 2011, Mad Ice released his EP titled Maisha. Recorded in Finnvox Studios, and produced by Oona Kapari, it was a great departure from earlier materials towards a softer soul sound. The EP resulted in release of title track "Maisha", "Te Amo" and a big hit "Mapenzi Sumu" spearheaded by a music video directed by Joseph Bitar in Helsinki, Finland in July 2011.

== Personal life ==
He moved to Finland in 2004 for promoting a musical career and applied for permanent residency and citizenship in 2006. He is married to Niina, a Finnish woman and the couple have two kids together. Mad Ice has also a daughter from a previous relationship in Tanzania.

== Discography ==
=== Albums ===
Title	Album details	Notes
Baby Gal	Released: 2003; Label: Kokwa Records, Tanzania; Format: CD	No. / Title / Length; 1. / "Baby gal (rmx)" / 5:07; 2. / "Sema" / 4:00; 3. / "Wanadamu" / 4.03; 4. / "Nyindondalo" / 6:04; 5. / "Samahani" / 4:11; 6. / "Mateso" / 3:58; 7. / "Baby gal (original mix)" / 4:21; 8. / "Rose feat. The Vultures" / 3:25; 9. / "Motherless child feat. Ona" / 3:51; 10. / "Wanadamu (hiphop rmx feat. Dnob, K2fresh)" / 4:03; 11. / "Nyindondalo (rmx)" / 7:11; 12. / "Samahani (nyumba mix)" / 4:21; 13. / "Mateso (rmx)" / 4:16; 14. / "Wanadamu (Club mix)" / 3:31
Mad Ice	Released: 2005; Label: Mwamba Records / Edel Records, Finland; Format: CD	
Maneno	Released: 2007; Label: Recordhouse Music / MadStylee.com, Finland; Format: CD, Downloads	No. / Title / Length; 1. / "Nionyeshe Njia – Show Me the Way" / 4:06; 2. / "Wange" / 4:20; 3. / "Carolina" / 4:26; 4. / "Mwanamke Ni Tabia" / 3:31; 5. / "Maneno (Acoustic Live Studio Jam)" / 3:36; 6. / "Malaika" / 3:35; 7. / "Show Me the Way (Nionyeshe Njia English Version)" / 4:05; 8. / "Maneno (Bongomix)" / 3:58

Compilation album

Title	Album details	Notes
Best of Mad Ice, Vol. 1	Released: December 2012; Label: Format: CD	

=== Albums ===
Title
Maisha EP
Album details
- Released: 2011
- Label: Recordhouse Music, Finland
- Format: CD, Downloads
Notes

No.	Title	Length
1.	"Maisha"	4:33
2.	"Te Amo"	4:05
3.	"Mapenzi Sumu"	4:02
4.	"Nisikilize"	4:49
5.	"Sogea"	4:01

=== Singles ===
- 2006: "Baby Gal"
- 2007: "Wange"
- 2007: "Malaika"
- 2010: "Ready for Dis"
- 2012: "Ninatamani" (with Miikka Mwamba)
- 2012: "Te Amo"
- 2012: "Mapenzi Sumu"
- 2013: "Faith"
