= Kyllikki Solanterä =

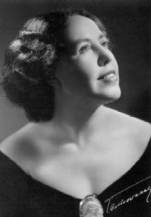
- Born: Kyllikki Wegelius; 3 August 1908; Messukylä, Finland
- Died: 12 November 1965 (aged 57); Helsinki, Finland
- Burial place: Honkanummi cemetery, Vantaa
- Other name: Donna
- Occupations: Singer, Vocal teacher and Lyricist
- Spouse: Lauri Mattias Solanterä (1902–1977)

Kyllikki Solanterä (1908–1965) was a singer, vocal teacher and lyricist from Finland. She adapted many popular songs from other languages into Finnish.

== Biography ==
Kyllikki was born 3 August 1908 as Kyllikki Wegelius in Messukylä, Finland, the youngest of the three children of gardener Ilmari Wegelius and his wife Elli Liukkonen. She performed under a variety of pseudonyms, including Donna, Kristiina, T. Nuoli, and K. Sara as well as her real name.

On 3 August 1929, she married the musician Lauri Mattias Solanterä, formerly Solander, (1902–1977).

She studied languages at the University of Helsinki with the aim of completing a master's degree in languages. She studied singing as a private student of Lyli Wendelin (1933–38), and then attended the Helsinki Conservatoire (1935–38), now the Sibelius Academy. In 1946, she made a study trip to Sweden.

=== Concerts ===
Solanterä gave her first concert at the University of Helsinki Ballroom on November 3, 1936, followed by many more. From 1950 to 1951 she sang on a concert tour that visited Stockholm, Copenhagen and Oslo. She also performed on radio 20 times between 1937 and 1951, accompanied by a studio orchestra or various pianists.

The sound of Solanterä's voice is preserved on only two "78-round discs," each featuring Matti Lehtinen on both sides. On the recordings, originally from the movie Alice in Wonderland, she performs songs "Good Advice" and "Summer Day Golden" accompanied by the His Master's Voice orchestra, conducted by Ensio Kosta.

Her best-known lyrics include "The Little Duckling" (by Bernard Zaritsky) recorded by the Kippar Quartet, and "Unforgettable Evening" by Georg Ots and composed by Vasili Soloviev-Sedoi.

=== Teachings ===
Solanterä was a singing teacher for more than 25 years at the National Conservatory of Educational Organizations from 1937 to 1963, and from 1937 on, she was a private voice teacher and a lecturer in Finnish Music Teachers' Union courses.

=== Death ===
Solanterä died 12 November 1965 in Helsinki at 57 years of age, and she is buried in Honkanummi cemetery in Vantaa. She is remembered for her holiday music, "Kyllikki Solanterä has made musical magic for Christmas. Renditions of songs like Oi jouluyö make us merry and bright every year!"

== Songs adapted to Finnish ==
She was both a lyricist and translator of orchestral Finnish works by Jean Sibelius and others.

Her adaptations were many. She wrote the Finnish version of the lyrics for all of the following popular songs; all were written by Solanterä alone unless otherwise noted. For these adaptations, the Finnish title is shown on the left and the original language title is shown in parentheses. She adapted the songs from many languages, including English, German, Spanish, French, Russian and Scandinavian languages.

- Amigo, (Amigo)
- Cuanto le gusta, (Cuanto le gusta)
- Enkelkellot, (Änglaklockor)
- Hääkellot, (Hochzeitsglocken)
- Hauva ikkunassa, (The Doggie in the Window)
- Isabella, (Isabella) (Andalusische Märchen)
- Itke en lemmen tähden, (Nur nicht aus Liebe weinen)
- Josef Josef, (Yosel)
- Jos sua lemmin rakkahin, (Mind if I Make Love to You)
- Jussin tango, (O'Malley's Tango)
- Kentucky valssi, (Kentucky Waltz)
- Kun yö on valoton, (A media luz)
- Läpi seinien, (In the Middle of the House)
- Lemmen paula, (True Love)
- Lemmentuskissasi, (Me lo dijo Adela)
- Liisa Ihmemaassa, (Alice in Wonderland) (adapted by M.A. Numminen, Kyllikki Solanterä)
- Mä päivänsäteen näin kerran pienen, (You Are My Sunshine)
- Miks' tämän mulle teit, (Singing the Blues)
- Odotus, (Unchained Melody)
- Oi jouluyö, (Minuit, chrétiens)
- Onni, (Lyckan)
- On syömmein lemmensairas, (Mein Herz sehnt sich nach Liebe)
- Päivänsäde, (You Are My Sunshine)
- Päivä viel' koittaapi, (Some Sunday Morning)
- Pieni ankanpoikanen, (The Little White Duck)
- Särjetyn sydämen hotelli, (Heartbreak Hotel)
- Sireenien aikaan, (Wenn der weiße Flieder wieder blüht)
- Soittoniekka, (Spelmannen)
- Sua lemmin, Samantha, (I Love You, Samantha)
- Syysserenadi, (Concerto d'autunno)
- Unelma tango, (Le tango du rêve)
- Unohtumaton ilta, (Подмосковные вечера) {Podmoskovnye vechera})
- Unten pursi, (Dreamboat)
- Uusi huomen, (Tomorrow)

== External sources ==
- Otava Great Music Encyclopedia 5, p. 291. Otava, Helsinki 1979.
