= Maukka Perusjätkä =

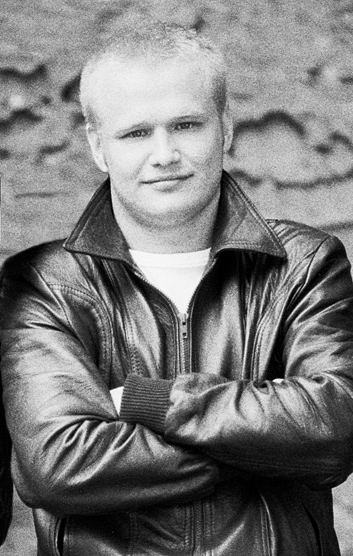
Maukka Perusjätkä

Maukka Perusjätkä (born in Helsinki, Finland, 22 July 1961) is the stage name of Mauri Airta, a Finnish new wave and punk rocker during the 1970s and 1980s. He is especially known for his 1979 song Säpinää ("Breaking Away"), which included chainsaw sounds. Chainsaws became one of his trademarks.

In the 1970s Perusjätkä (literally "Ordinary guy") worked with the most notable figures in the Finnish rock scene, known especially for his pairing with Ralf Örn. His first band was called Maukka and Nahkatakit (Literally "Maukka and the Leather Jackets"). His first record was released under the name Maukka Perusjätkä Ja Sota Apatiaa Vastaan ("Maukka Ordinary Guy and the War against Apathy"). After the 1980s, Perusjätkä became less active in the music scene. Although a rebel in his youth, Perusjätkä became a symbol for conservative values and a Finnish mindset of knives and booze. Perusjätkä has recently released a recording, yet nowadays most of his Finnish fanbase goes to pubs.

Perusjätkä was most widely known for his songs Säpinää, Vaatteet on mun aatteet (Clothes Are My Ideology), Herneenpalot (Pea Pods), and the album Maukka & Ile's Disko.
