= Kinetik Control =

Finnish musical group

- Origin: Helsinki, Finland
- Genres: Pop; Rock; Electronic
- Years active: 2004–present
- Labels: Danse Macabre 2011–2012; Toyboyz 2009–2013; CMM Marketing/Enorm Music 2008–2009; Bonnier Amigo Music Group 2007–2008
- Members: Sauli Vuoti; Harri Hytönen
- Website: kinetikcontrol.com

Kinetik Control is a Finnish rock band formed in 2004 by the composer and lyricist Sauli Vuoti. The band's sound used to incorporate electronic elements to rock and pop music, but nowadays the music is more pop oriented. Kinetik Control has released eight singles, one EP and three albums. Kinetik Control's most known songs are "The Mutt", "No-One Knows About Us", "Give A Little Love", "All Fours" and "Chinese Medicine", which featured Michael Monroe as a guest musician.

== History ==
=== Enslaving the Audio (2006) ===
The group's first EP, Enslaving the Audio, was recorded in Oulu at Q-Studio and in the group's own Studio Kinetik during winter 2006. The EP was mixed and mastered by Mikko Karmila at Finnvox-studios. The musical style on the EP can be described as pop/rock with gothic influences. In contrast to the original plans, the EP was released in electronic format only, although a limited edition of 100 copies was pressed. However, the EP brought some raised eyebrows in Europe as Metal Hammer (UK) chose the group as the newcomer of the month in October 2007.

=== Lack of Divine Inspiration (2007–2008) ===
After the positively received EP, Tweak and Dexter begun writing new material for their debut album, Lack of Divine Inspiration. In 2007 Kinetik Control signed a deal with Bonnier Amigo Music Group and the recordings of the debut album, Lack of Divine Inspiration, were initiated in October 2007. The album was recorded in Studio Kinetik and in Finnvox-studios. The album was released in Finland in May 2008.

The song "Vanguard of the New World" was released as a single on 18 November and on its release week it topped both the Official Finnish Download Chart and the Official Finnish Single Chart. A music video for the song was also filmed. In Autumn 2008 the band made a distributing contract with CMM Marketing / Enorm Music and Lack of Divine Inspiration was released in Europe 28 October 2008. During the latter part of the year 2008 the band played shows extensively in Finland.

=== 2009-2010 ===
Kinetik Control finished the recordings of the new album Only Truth Remains in October 2009. The album was mixed by Jyrki Tuovinen at Fried Music in Helsinki and it was mastered by Svante Forsbäck. Michael Monroe appears as a special guest on the album, performing on several songs.

The first single of the album, "In This Life" was released in April 2010, and it went directly on the 4th position of the Finnish Download Chart. In August 2010 the band released the second single "All Fours", as a free download on the web pages of one of the largest TV-stations of Finland, MTV3. The second album Only Truth Remains was released on 29 November and it entered the official Finnish album chart and conquered the first place of the independent music chart. The album got good reviews, for example 5/5 in the largest music magazine in Finland, Soundi. The second single "All Fours" stayed on Swedish Radio's Finska Pinnar program's chart for ten weeks in a row. Kinetik Control also toured Finland extensively during the first part of 2011.

=== 2011-2013 ===
Kinetik Control started to record their third album Live To Work And Work To Die in late 2011. The band toured in Finland and Central Europe extensively in 2011–2012. The album was produced by AH Haapasalo. The album was released in April 2013, in Finland by Toyboyz and in the United States Of America by Water Music Records. The album was the first, where the band shortened their name simply to Kinetik. The album entered the official Finnish album chart, but the entry was later removed, because the distribution of the album did not meet the criteria of the official chart in terms of being available in a required amount of different record stores. Distribution of the album was initially done exclusively with Recordshop X and CDON.com and was only sold from their outlets, which made it impossible to meet the criteria. The band had a highly notable, nationwide advertising campaign in cooperation with Verkkokauppa.com, and also performed live in acoustic in the Finnish national TV-channel Yle Fem. Two singles were released from the album, "Heaven's Disgrace" and "True Love Is Hard To Find". The band also filmed a music video of the song "Give A Little Love".

=== 2014 ===
In 2014 the band started a break after performing live at NAMM and Popkomm among others. In September 2015, the band announced a concert booking deal with My Music Agency. The band announced that they would start using the original, full name Kinetik Control again.

=== 2018 ===
In 2018, the band released a new single "Last Choice", and announced that it was working with on new music. The band now presented itself as a trio. The music on the new single was electronic in the vein of the debut album, but with more pop sensibility.

== Members ==
- Sauli Vuoti – vocals, guitar, synthesizer
- Harri Hytönen – guitar

== Discography ==
=== Studio albums ===
- Lack of Divine Inspiration (2008)
- Only Truth Remains (2010)
- Live To Work And Work To Die (2013)

=== Mini albums ===
- Enslaving the Audio (2006)

=== Singles ===
| Year | Single | Date | Peak chart positions | | Album |
| Year | Single | Date | Single chart | Download chart | Album |
|---|---|---|---|---|---|
| 2008 | "Lack of Divine Inspiration" | 28 May | 3 | 2 | Lack of Divine Inspiration |
| 2008 | "No-One Knows about Us" | 10 June | 4 | 2 | Lack of Divine Inspiration |
| 2008 | "The Mutt" | 26 August | 2 | 2 | Lack of Divine Inspiration |
| 2008 | "Vanguard of the New World" | 18 November | 1 | 1 | Lack of Divine Inspiration |
| 2010 | "In This Life" | 11 May | 4 | - | Only Truth Remains |
| 2011 | "Heaven's Disgrace" | 31 August | - | - | Live to Work and Work to Die |
| 2018 | "Last Choice" | 25 May | - | - | |

=== Music videos ===
- Vanguard of the New World (2008, directed by Ahti Ahde)

The music video for the song “Vanguard of the New World” was directed by Ahti Ahde. The video was shot in Helsinki during spring 2008. The theme of the video follows closely the subjects of the record and the lyrics, namely the grip of money and power over the modern day man.

- All Fours (2010, directed by Tuukka Lappalainen)

The music video for the song “All Fours” was directed by Tuukka Lappalainen. The video was shot in Helsinki during winter 2010.

- Give A Little Love (2013, directed by Valtteri Hirvonen)

The music video for the song "Give A Little Love" was directed by Valtteri Hirvonen. The video was shot in Helsinki during winter 2013.
