= J. Alfred Tanner =

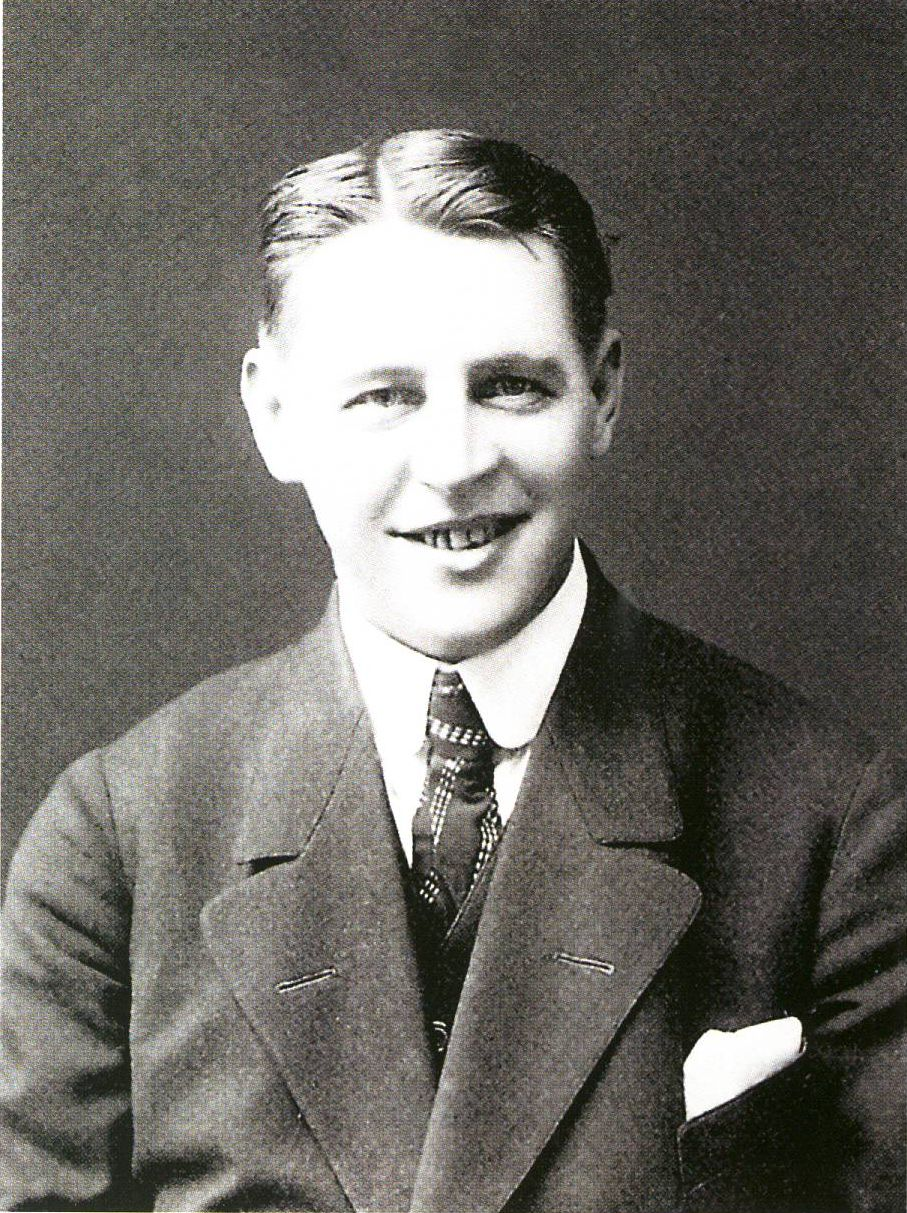

Background information
- Birth name: Johan Alfred Tanner
- Born: March 16, 1884; Artjärvi, Finland
- Died: May 27, 1927 (aged 43); Rautalampi, Finland
- Genres: Cuplé, schlager music
- Occupation(s): Singer, songwriter
- Instrument: Vocals
- Years active: 1910s and 1920s
- Labels: His Master's Voice, Gramophone Company, Victor Talking Machine Company

Johan Alfred Tanner, better known as J. Alfred Tanner, (March 16, 1884 – May 27, 1927) was a Finnish singer and songwriter. He is considered as one of Finland's most important songwriters ever, he wrote the lyrics to over 100 songs and recorded about 70 of them.

Tanner was born in Artjärvi but grew up Helsinki. Initially he worked as a builder, but had to change his occupation when a building designed by architect Gustaf Estlander collapsed in Kaivopuisto in 1907, even though Tanner was not responsible for the disaster. Instead, Tanner became an entertainer and started to perform at the cinematograph Helikon at Kluuvinkatu in Helsinki. There he became good friend with Rafael Ramstedt and Theodor Weissman, with whom he also performed at the capital's restaurants and cafes.

Between 1911 and 1926, Tanner recorded 70 songs in Finland, Sweden and Germany. The 1924 recording session was made in Camden, New Jersey. Tanner made a visit in the US in 1922, but the socialistic Finnish American settlers boycotted his performances, because for them Tanner was a symbol for the white Finland. In the 1920s, Tanner was diagnosed with tuberculosis and died at his summer place Nujula in Rautalampi.

Some of Tanner's most popular songs are Kulkurin valssi, Orpopojan valssi, Laulu on iloni ja työni and Kalle Aaltonen. His co-worker and personal friend Rafael Ramstedt translated a few of his songs to Swedish and recorded them. Many of Tanner's songs are published in the book Kuolemattomat kupletit and in several song booklets.
