= Kaija Lustila =

Finnish singer

Kaija Lustila (born 8 November 1965) is a Finnish singer. She first came to fame as a tango singer; now her repertoire includes evergreens, iskelmä and Finnish pop.

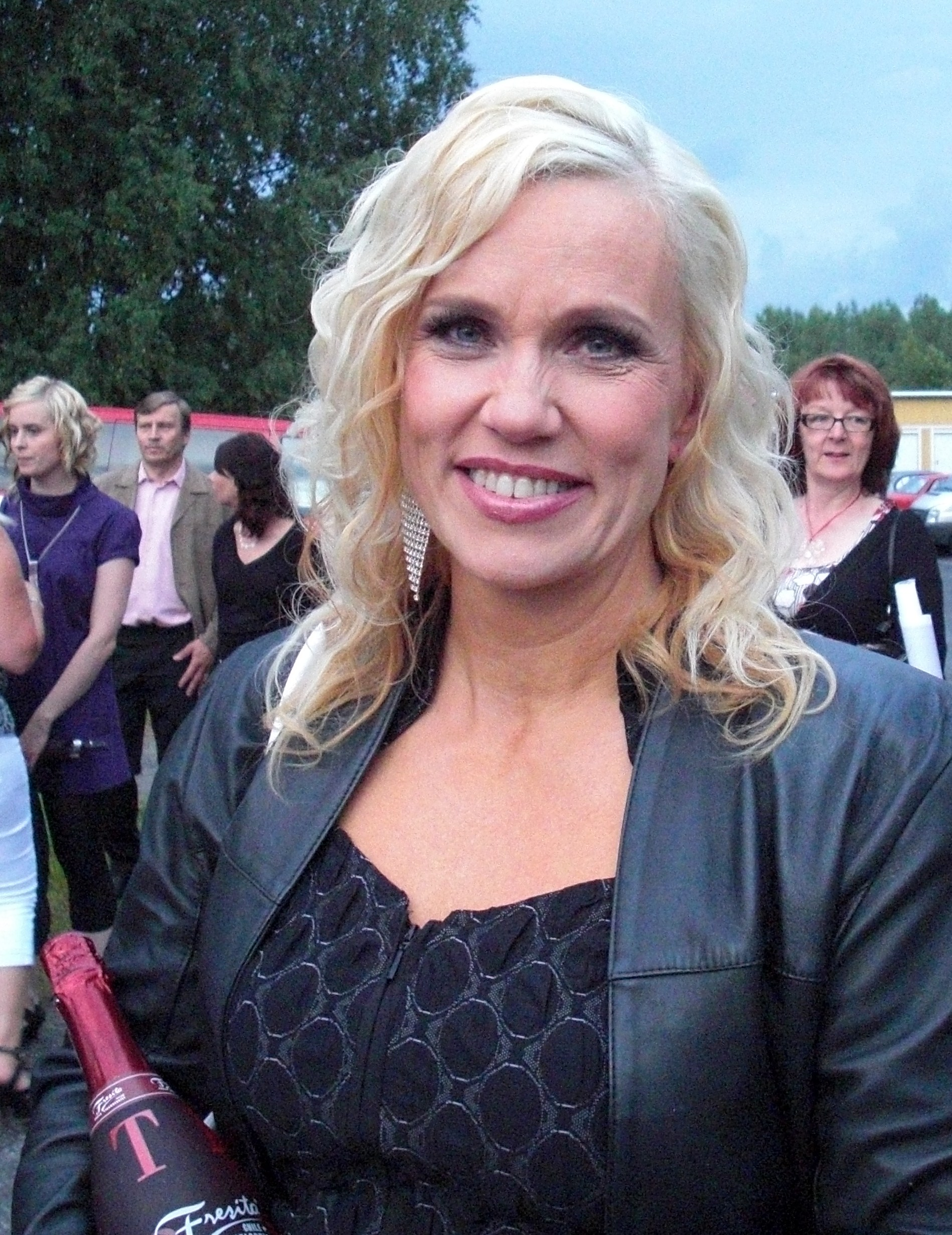
Kaija Lustila at the 2009 Tangomarkkinat

== Biography ==
Lustila was born in Kurikka. Her career began in 1982, when she had the opportunity to audition with Risto Oja-Lipasti's band. Within a few years she had made such an impression on the dancing public that she formed her own band, Pajero, with herself as solo singer. (Latva & Tuunainen p 254)

In 1987 she entered the prestigious Tangomarkkinat competition and reached the finals, though she did not win. One of her fellow competitors was Aura Stenroth, the mother of 2007 Tango King Henri Stenroth. (Nyman p 220)

Her first album was "Sellaiset silmät" (Eyes Like These) in 1992. Other albums followed in 1994, 1999, 2004 and 2011. In 1999 she took part in the Sysyn sävel competition with "Kaukainen tähti" (Faraway Star). (Latva & Tuunainen p 254)

In 2009 she took part in the Tangomarkkinat again, and came second to Amadeus Lundberg. It was unfortunate for her that the rules had changed to allow only one winner; under the previous rules a male and a female winner were chosen, and she would have been Tango Queen. (Ilkka 12 July 2009)

Kaija is an enthusiastic dancer herself and maintains that danceability is a necessity when it comes to music. (Latva & Tuunainen p 255)

== Discography ==
Albums

- 1992 Sellaiset silmät
- 1994 Kaija Lustila
- 1999 Meitä tansittaa
- 2004 Sydän ohjaa
- 2009 Tangomarkkinat 22 (1 track)
- 2011 Näiden tähtien alla

Singles

- 1992 Sellaiset silmät & Tule kanssani
- 1993 Sinun aina & Armonaikaa & Liisa ihmemaan
- 1993 Sinun aina & On sellainen ihmisen mieli
- 1994 On sellainen ihmisen mieli & Tänne minä kuulun & Sydämet
- 1999 Anna pois muistot
- 1999 (Syksyn sävel) Kaukainen tähti
- 2003 Mikä mies

== Sources ==
- Marja Nyman, Tangokuninkaalliset, Revontuli 2002, ISBN 952-5170-27-6
- Tony Latva and Petri Tuunainen, Iskelmän tähtitaivas, WSOY 2004, ISBN 951-0-27817-3
