= Tapani Plathan =

Finnish operatic bass singer

Tapani Plathan (born 1984) is a Finnish operatic bass singer.

Plathan studied at the Sibelius Academy in Helsinki, Finland. He made his operatic debut as Sarastro in The Magic Flute, at Kokkola Opera, in 2011. Since then Plathan has appeared as a guest in the Finnish National Opera. His roles there include Dulcamara in L'elisir d'amore and Masetto in Don Giovanni.

For the season 2014-2015 Plathan was engaged in the solo ensemble of Landestheater Coburg, where he sang roles such as Osmin in Die Entführung aus dem Serail and Colline in La Bohème. In 2015-2016 he was part of ensemble in Saarländisches Staatstheater in Saarbrücken, and received good reviews there for his Leporello in Don Giovanni, a role which he has performed also as a guest in Croatian National Theatre Ivan pl. Zajc in Rijeka, Helsinki Festival, and latest, in Savonlinna Opera Festival.

In the season 2016-2017 Tapani Plathan has performed as a guest in the Komische Oper Berlin, the Staatsoper Unter den Linden and the Opéra-Théâtre de Metz Métropole.
