= Tangomarkkinat =

Tango festival in Seinäjoki, Finland

- Genre: Tango
- Location: Seinäjoki, Finland
- Years active: 1985–present
- Website: Official Site

The Tangomarkkinat is the world's oldest tango festival. It is held early every July in Seinäjoki, Finland since 1985. As well as competitions to find the country's best tango singers, composers, and dancers, the festival features public dancing to live music provided by the best Finnish entertainers. Music for public dancing is not restricted to tango: it includes all the dance rhythms popular in Finland: but tango content must, according to the rules, be at least 40%.

== History ==
The festival had its origins in a Finnish sauna. Lasse Lintala, the director of the Ilmajoki Music Festival and his wife were in the sauna with the director of the MTV3 TV channel Tauno Äijälä and his wife Katja. Lintala was hoping to get the festival on TV. Äijälä suggested incorporating tango into the festival and perhaps a musical based on tango singer Olavi Virta. The idea was developed for a couple of years, but Ilmajoki was not interested. Lintala travelled to Helsinki to tell Äijälä the bad news. On the train he got into conversation with Matti Nuolivirta, the Mayor of Seinäjoki, and his deputy Risto Hakala who were keen for the festival to be held in Seinäjoki.

Seinäjoki city council approved the venture, and in January 1985 the Tango Music Advancement Association was established. Backers were Seinäjoki city council, Seinäjoki's Maila-Jussit pesäpallo team, and the Marit and Mikot choir.

About 18,000 people took part in the first Tangomarkkinat in July 1985, and over 1½ million people watched the TV broadcast. Seinäjoki city invested 60,000 marks. For the first three years of its existence the Tangomarkkinat was plagued by bad weather, and in 1988 it made a loss of 100,000 marks, exacerbated by the lack of success of the Olavi Virta musical, which premiered that year. In 1989 a combination of excellent weather and the immensely popular new Tango Queen Arja Koriseva put the event back in the black. The most successful year was 1999, when attendance was a record 130,600 and the profit was 805,000 marks. President Tarja Halonen attended the 20th Tangomarkkinat in 2004, when 34 past and present Tango Royals were gathered together for a special radio concert.

== Tango Royals ==
The tango singing competition is open to both men and women. In 1985 and 1986 just one winner was chosen, and the winners in both years were men. In 1987 it was decided that a male and a female winner would be chosen. The selection process starts with heats held all over Finland. Until 1991 ten finalists (5 men and 5 women) were sent to Seinäjoki, where 2 men and 2 women were eliminated in the televised "semifinal final" on the Friday of the Tangomarkkinat. On the Saturday, in the "final final", the Tango King and Queen were chosen, the runners-up being Princes and Princesses. Since 1992 a semifinal has been held in Raisio, near Turku, where 20 semifinalists are reduced to 10. This too is televised. Since 2002 the Raisio judges have chosen 12 finalists, from whom the viewers vote for their 10 favourites. The tangos which the competitors will sing are allocated by lot.

In 2007 the final was revamped. Only 2 men and 2 women are chosen on the Friday. On Saturday each must sing one classic and one modern tango; and furthermore the two men and the two women sing a modern tango in duet. One of the modern tangos used in 2007 was Takes Two to Tango, written in English by Jari Sillanpää for the 2004 Eurovision Song Contest and translated into Finnish for the Tangomarkkinat.

In 2009 it was announced that only one Tango Royal, who could be a man or a woman, would be appointed. The public would be allowed to vote in both the final and the semifinal. From 2013 onwards both Tango King and Tango Queen have again been chosen.

Dance halls and other venues book the winners of the competition months in advance, so whoever does win gets a ready booked up tour. They also get a recording contract and are expected to attend the three following Tangomarkkinat festivals.

Famous tango royals include Arja Koriseva, Jari Sillanpää, Sauli Lehtonen, Saija Varjus, Erika Vikman, Eija Kantola, Mira Kunnasluoto, Kaija Lustila and Kaija Pohjola. The youngest was Heidi Kyrö, aged 15, who was Tango Princess in 1993.

== Other competitions ==
From the beginning there has been a competition for the best new tango of the year. In 1985 the winner was Elämäni nainen, which is now a classic. The 2007 winners, Raju rakastaja and Onko rikos rakastaa? were given extra publicity by being included in the televised finals of the singing competition.

There is also a tango dancing competition, open to all comers. 1985 winners were Osmo and Tuula Katjos. Since 2002 there has been a separate senior section.

Other competitions which have been held at various times in the Tangomarkkinat's long history include the "Golden Stars" non-tango singing competition, a jive competition, and a Miss Tango beauty contest.

== Sources ==
- Marja Nyman, Tangokuninkaalliset, Revontuli 2002, ISBN 952-5170-27-6
- M.A. Numminen, Tango on intohimoni, Schilds 1998, ISBN 951-50-0918-9
