= Walfrid Lehto =

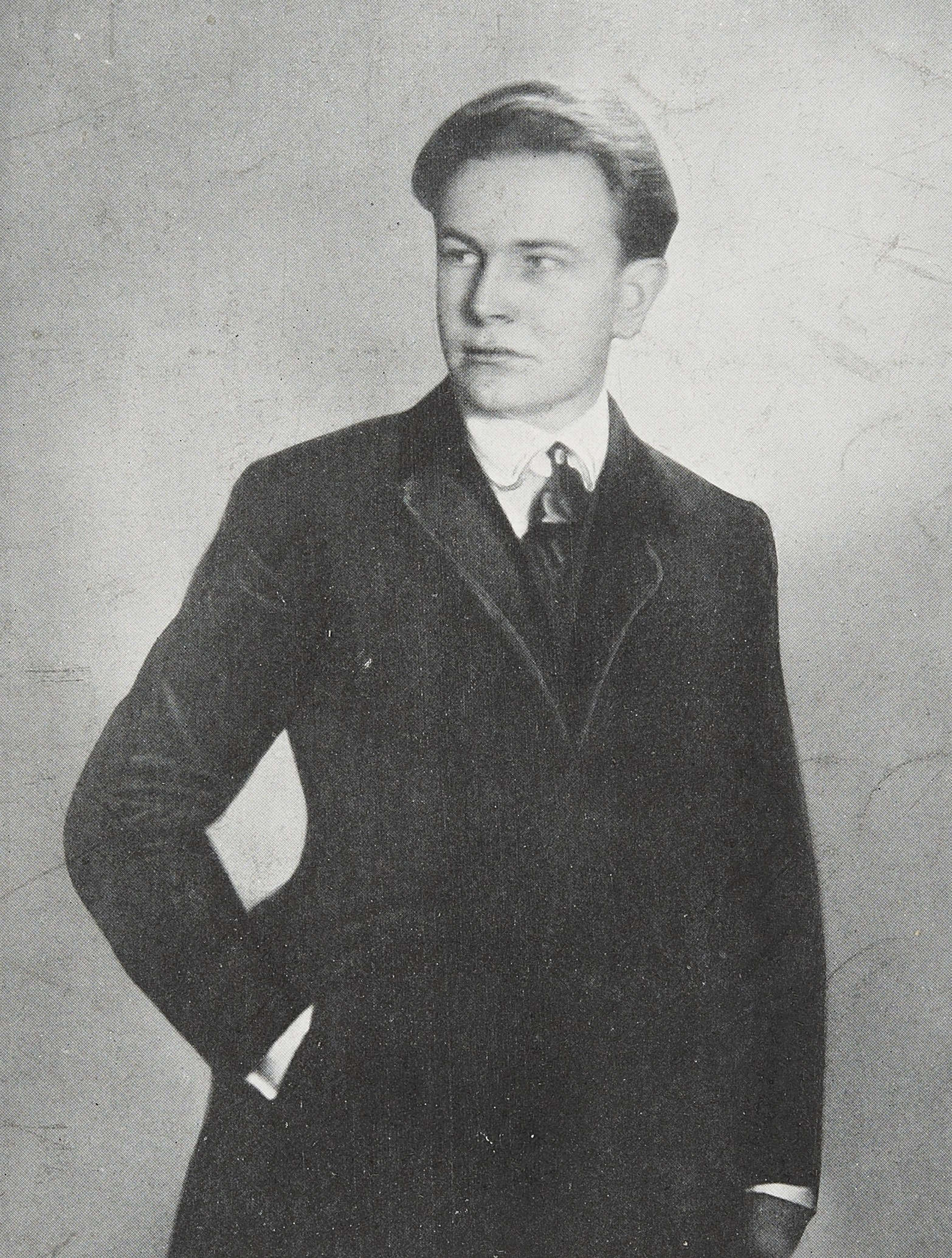
- Walfrid Lehto in the 1920s.

Background information
- Born: Valfrid Olganpoika; May 11, 1896; Hassi, Jämsä, Finland
- Died: January 4, 1946 (aged 49) Hassi, Jämsä, Finland
- Genres: Opera, schlager music
- Occupation: Singer
- Instrument: Vocals
- Years active: 1920s and 1930s
- Labels: His Master's Voice, Victor Talking Machine Company

Walfrid Lehto, originally Valfrid Olganpoika, (May 11, 1896 – January 4, 1946) was a Finnish American singer. He is better known by his stage name Volpi Leuto.

Lehto learned to sing in his home village of Hassi in the municipality of Jämsä, and made a study trip to California in 1926. He settled down in New York City, where he performed at cafes and restaurants. Between 1928 and 1929, Lehto recorded 20 Finnish songs for His Master's Voice and Victor Talking Machine Company in New York. All recordings were made under his stage name Volpi Leuto and some recordings were made with the Finnish-American Östman-Stein Orchestra. For eight years Lehto lived in America and returned to Finland in the 1930s. He was no longer able to sing, and died a poor man in his home village of Hassi.

== Discography ==
=== July 6, 1928 ===
- Kulkurin masurkka
- Ramona

=== August 20, 1928 ===
- Angela mia
- Maria Mari

=== December 10, 1928 ===
- Elomme päivät
- Hyvästi jää

=== December 18, 1928 ===
- Volgan venemiesten laulu

=== December 20, 1928 ===
- Vanhat mummot

=== December 24, 1928 ===
- Aurinkoinen
- Siirtolaisen kaiho

=== March 7, 1929 ===
- Oi kiitos sä luojani armollinen (together with Margherita Violante)
- Soipa kieli (together with Margherita Violante)
- Tuoll' on mun kultani (together with Margherita Violante)
- Äiti ja kulkuripoika (together with Margherita Violante)

=== April 26, 1929 ===
- Sä olet mielestän kaunihimpi

=== May 15, 1929 ===
- Tuule tuuli leppeämmmin

=== June 6, 1929 ===
- Miks' onneansa etsii (together with Annie Mörk)
- Mustalaisruhtinatar (together with Annie Mörk)

=== July 5, 1929 ===
- Pyhä napoli
- Pääsky
