= Saija Varjus =

Finnish popular musician (born 1965)

Saija Varjus (born 30 January 1965 in Parkano) is a Finnish popular musician. She was chosen the "Tango Queen" 1996 in the Tangomarkkinat festival in Seinäjoki. This was her second attempt: she had competed in 1993 but only reached as far as the semifinal.

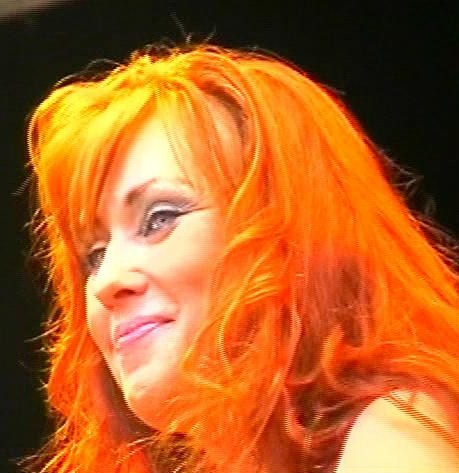
Saija Varjus at the 2005 Tangomarkkinat

== Biography ==
Varjus had previously worked as a teacher. Her most famous recordings include "Dam dam da da di dum" (1997), "Vastatuuleen" (1998), "Kuiskaten" (2002) and "Ihana aamu" (2002).

In January 1998, Saija Varjus was diagnosed with multiple sclerosis.

On 13 October 2007, she married the guitarist Petri Hämäläinen.

== Discography ==
- Saija Varjus (1997)
- Yambaijaa (1998)
- Tähtiin kirjoitettu (2000)
- Parhaat (2001)
- "Ihana aamu" (2002)
- "Varjus" (2007)

== Awards ==
- Tango Queen (1996)

== Sources ==
- Marja Nyman, Tangokuninkaalliset, Revontuli 2002, ISBN 952-5170-27-6
- Tony Latva and Petri Tuunainen, Iskelmän tähtitaivas, WSOY 2004, ISBN 951-0-27817-3
