= Theodor Weissman =

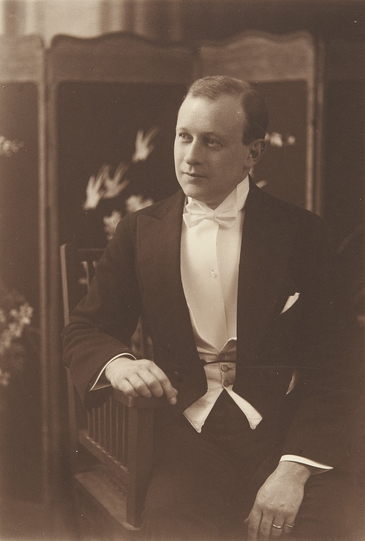
- Weissman in 1936

Background information
- Born: Theodor Jacob Mauritz Weissman; January 1, 1891; Hämeenlinna, Finland
- Died: March 29, 1966 (aged 75) Helsinki, Finland
- Genres: Schlager music
- Occupations: Singer, songwriter
- Instrument: Vocals
- Years active: 1913–1940s
- Labels: His Master's Voice, Homocord

Theodor Jacob Mauritz Weissman, originally Weissmann, (January 1, 1891 – March 29, 1966) was a Finnish singer, songwriter and actor. He was one of Finland's most popular singers in the 1910s and 1920s.

Weissman was born in Hämeenlinna in 1891 and his music career began in 1913 when he started to perform at the theatre Helikon in Helsinki. During the Finnish Civil War Weissman performed at restaurants with Rafael Ramstedt and between 1917 and 1918 he was hired as an actor at the theatre in Vyborg. He made his first recordings in Finland in 1913 and then in Sweden in 1927. In June 1929 Weissman was invited by the recording company Homocord to come to Berlin and make recordings with Finnish songs. Weissman returned to Berlin in 1930 and 1931. Among Weissman's most popular songs were the waltz Linnunrata ("Milky Way") by Jules Sylvain, but mainly he recorded comic songs by Tatu Pekkarinen and J. Alfred Tanner.

When the cuplés became obsolete in the 1930s, Weissman changed his occupation and worked for many years as a businessman. Among his friends Weissman was known as a gentleman, who always wore white tie, a top hat and a white carnation on his chest.

Weissman died in 1966 in Helsinki.
