= Arja Koriseva =

Finnish singer (born 1965)

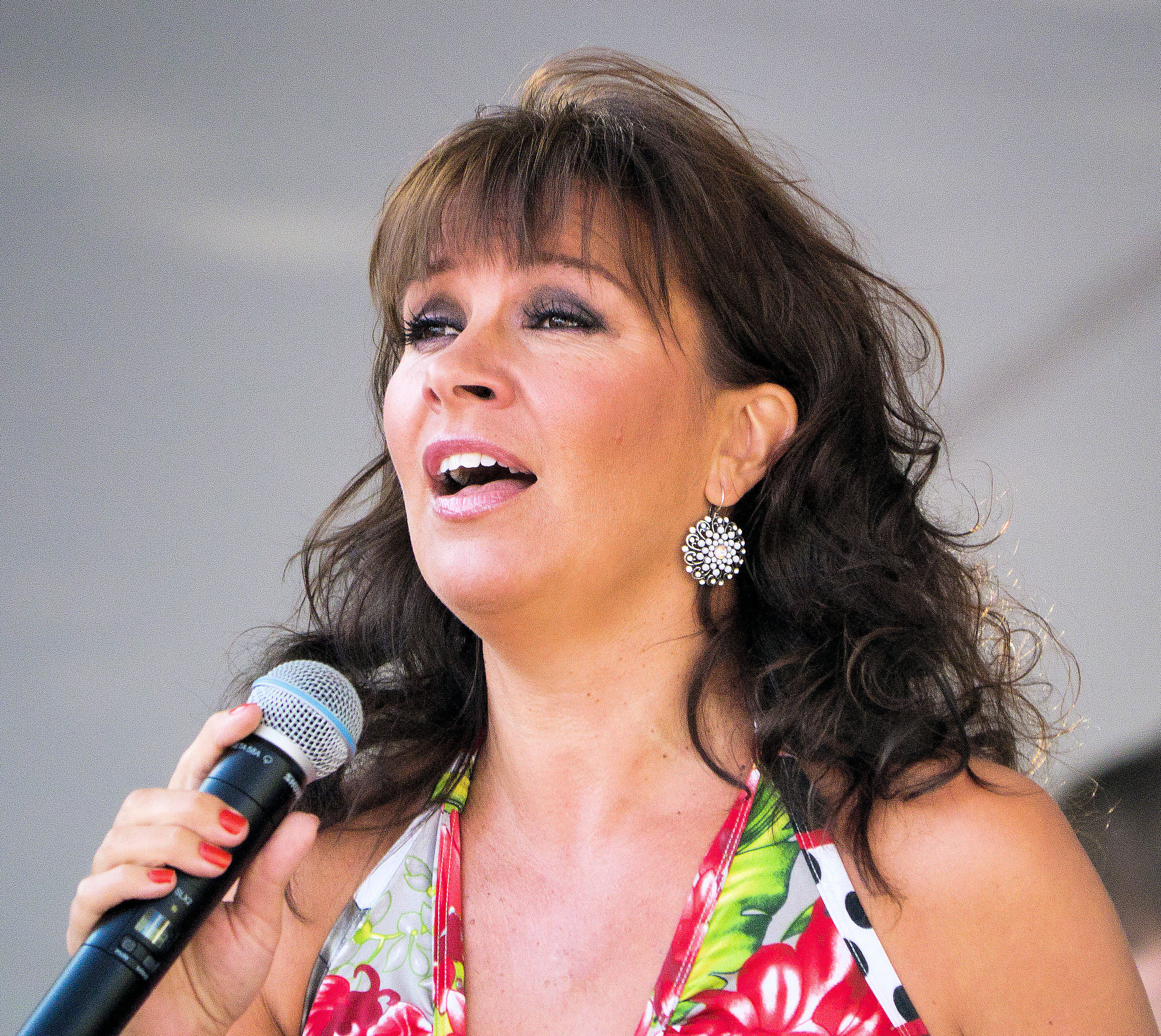
- Koriseva in 2011

Background information
- Also known as: Aikku
- Born: Arja Sinikka Koriseva; 21 April 1965 (age 61); Toivakka, Finland
- Genres: Finnish tango; evergreen; pop; musical theatre; sacred
- Occupation: Singer
- Instrument: Vocals
- Years active: 1989-present
- Website: arjakoriseva.fi

Arja Koriseva (born 21 April 1965) is a Finnish singer. She first came to fame as a tango singer; her repertoire now includes evergreen, pop, musical theatre, and sacred music.

Koriseva has sold over 330,000 certified records, making her the seventh best-selling female soloist in Finland.

== Biography ==
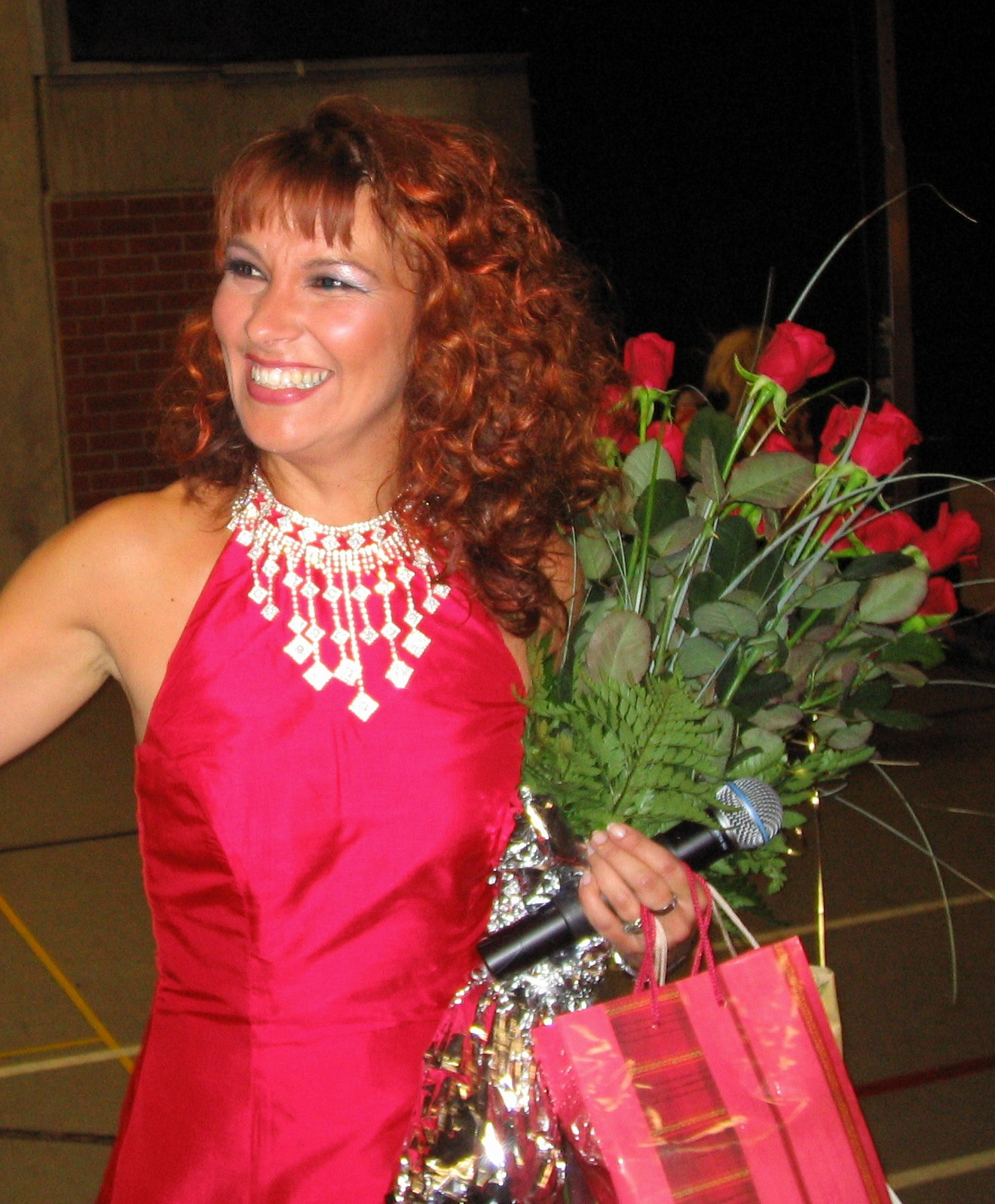
Koriseva at the 2004 Tangomarkkinat

Koriseva said of the village school she attended:

“The school was very small and homey; my class had just three pupils. We were good in different subjects and learned a lot from each other. Because we were so few, the classes were joined so that the first and second were together, the third and fourth similarly, and so on. During the breaks we went swimming; on Shrove Tuesday we tobogganed. The cook baked pulla buns and brought them to us with juice as a snack. In fine weather, we had lessons outside and when it was raining, we did sums in class. Once a storm blew down a birch tree in the school yard, we made firewood from it and carried them inside.” (Nyman, p. 51)

Koriseva grew up in a family inclined towards music: her parents were both active in their church choir, and Koriseva's maternal uncle, Erkki Friman, is a harmonikka player (The Finnish harmonikka is not a mouth organ. It is a kind of accordion, with symmetrically arranged buttons instead of piano keys. It is not the same instrument as a bandoneon).

Koriseva and her sister/fellow singer, Eija (b. 31 October 1963), sang with the Peräkylä Boys band in youth hostels, holiday camps, restaurants and various other places in central Finland from 1978. When the Peräkylä Boys broke up to continue their studies, the Koriseva sisters created a new band, Kastanja (“Chestnut”).

Note that Koriseva's sister, Eija, is not the same Eija Koriseva, who is a mathematics professor at the University of Helsinki.

In 1983, Koriseva was admitted to the Central Finland Conservatory to study music.

In the summer of 1984, Koriseva was a Lions Club scholarship student in Wilmar, Minneapolis, United States. She returned after three years for a summer with the same family. She said of this time:

“The family was quite wonderful and treated me like their own daughter. The father acted as teacher in the agricultural school and farmed maize. On the second visit I already had a driving licence and got the use of an old pick-up. I woke up early in the morning, put on a long-sleeved shirt and drove to the edge of the field to gather corncobs. In the field I prepared and packed them in dozens in cartons, then I had a shower and drove the corncobs to the shops. I could keep the money from the sales.” (Nyman, p 54)

This was a very appropriate job for a future tango star, as the classic tango El Choclo, written by Ángel Villoldo in 1903, means "the corncob". Meanwhile, Kastanja became the backing group for Marjo-Riitta Nieminen, who sings under the stage name Marjorie.

In 1985, Koriseva enrolled in the Hämeenlinna teacher training college and got qualified in 1989, specialising in PE and Finnish language.

In the spring of 1989, with her mother's encouragement, Koriseva entered the Tangomarkkinat singing competition. She engaged a new orchestra, Fortuna, and began to rehearse the tangos Kultaiset korvarenkaat and Vie meidät rakkauteen. These are not in fact Finnish tangos: the first is Golden Earrings, composed by Victor Young and the theme song of the film of the same name, the second is Tango d´Amour, by Leo Leandros.

After passing the preliminary heats, Koriseva applied for a temporary teaching post in case she was not successful at the Tangomarkkinat finals.

Dressed in a stage gown made by her sister Eija, she became the Tango Queen at her first attempt and turned the Tangomarkkinat from a local festival to an event of national importance. The Tangomarkkinat organisers tried to get her to adopt the stage name Arja Karen, as koriseva means "wheezing" in Finnish.

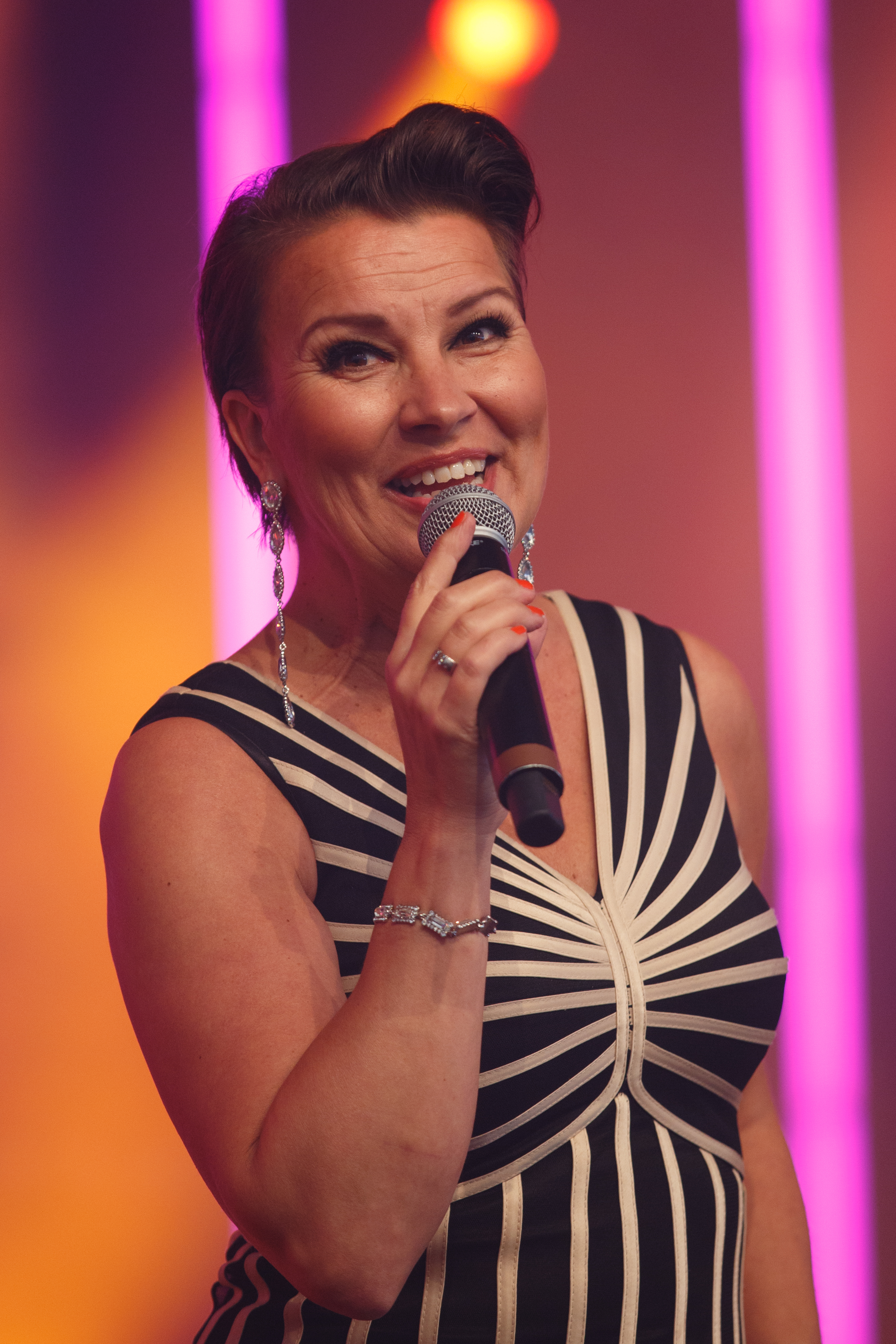
Arja Koriseva in 2019

Since then, Koriseva has recorded 15 albums (up to September 2007), and appeared in concerts and at dance halls all over Finland, as well as Canada, Australia, Switzerland, Jordan, and the UK. She has sung sacred music in church concerts, and appeared with Belgian superstar Helmut Lotti. She appears frequently on Finnish TV: she was a guest on the musical game show BumtsiBum! several times; she and Joel Hallikainen presented the musical game show Jos sais kerran in 2002–2003; and she was the heroine in the children's programme Hilarius and Loru-Liisa, with a giant mouse. She was the Finnish voice of Pocahontas in the animated film and TV series of that name. She has appeared in the soap opera Prince of Pop and in Ready Steady Cook. Koriseva has returned to the Tangomarkkinat several times as judge, and presented in 1991, 1994, and 2004. The spectacular Eyes of an Angel concert of 1999 was broadcast on national TV. She has attempted four times to represent Finland at the Eurovision Song Contest (1991, 1992, 1993, 2004), but has never been selected.

Koriseva has also appeared on stage: she was Liza in "My Fair Lady" and Maria in "Sound of Music". The run of the latter had to be cut short because Arja was 8 months pregnant.

On 2 November 2015, Koriseva was diagnosed with breast cancer.

=== Family ===
Koriseva met her husband, Juha-Pekka Karmala, in 1985 when they were both college students in Hämeenlinna. However, they did not get together until Karmala moved to Jyväskylä to study special needs teaching. They married on 20 July 1996 and have three children: Patrik (born 5 August 1995), Karla Sol Angel (born 20 July 2001 in Colombia, adopted), and Verna Luna Gunilla (born 8 November 2006). The pair are very protective of their children's privacy, and never talk about them to the papers or allow their photographs to be published.

== Discography ==
- 1989 Tango kuningatar ja kuningas (with Risto Nevala) (vinyl)
- 1990 Arja Koriseva (vinyl and CD)
- 1991 Me kaksi vain (vinyl and CD)
- 1991 Saa joulu aikaan sen (Christmas)
- 1992 Kun ilta saapuu kaupunkiin
- 1994 Naisten tie
- 1995 Rakastunut nainen
- 1996 Tango Illusion (all tangos)
- 1997 Mieli maailmoja juoksee
- 1997 Yö on hellä (with Tapani Kansa)
- 1998 Pieni kultainen avain
- 2001 Kuuntelitko sydäntäs
- 2002 Joulu joka päivä (Christmas)
- 2003 Nauran ja rakastan
- 2007 Kun aika on
- 2009 Minä taistelen
- 2011 Rakkaudesta jouluun (Christmas)
- 2012 Kirkossa (with Jouni Somero) (religious)
- 2012 Joulukirkossa (with Jouni Somero) (Christmas)

=== Reissues ===
- 1993 Parhaat
- 1995 Hymyhuulet
- 1996 Enkelin silmin 1990–1995
- 1998 Kuningaskobra
- 1999 Kymmenen ensimmäistä vuotta
- 2006 Tähtisarja – 30 suosikkia
- 2006 40 unohtumatonta laulua

=== Vinyl singles ===
- 1990 Kuningaskobra/Sua ilman rakkain
- 1990 Rakkauden värit/Kun tunteet kuljettaa
- 1991 Taakse taivaanrannan/Lähde pois
- 1992 Kun ilta saapuu kaupunkiin/Meitä on nyt kaksi
- 1992 Anna kaikkien kukkien kukkia (From the album Toivo Kärki muistoissamme. Other side has Ressu Redford: Jos vielä oot vapaa)

=== CD singles ===
- 1992 Mr Tango (dedicated to Reijo Pitkäkoski)
- 1993 Vain taivas yksin tietää/Huomiseen/Hymy vain
- 1994 Kai virheen tein/Rakkaus saa mut muuttumaan
- 1994 Et saa mua unohtaa/Rakkaus jää
- 1994 Naisen tie/Taittuu multakin Rock´n Roll
- 1995 Rakastunut nainen
- 1995 Kattojen Primadonna/Anna kätesi
- 1996 Tuulen värit/Jokin sisälläni
- 1996 Tähtien katse
- 1996 Yksin/Tango Illusion
- 1997 Suunnaton kaipaus
- 1997 Mieli maailmoja juoksee
- 1997 Kauas tuuli kuljettaa
- 1997 Onnenkyyneleet
- 1998 Rakkaus on ikuinen
- 1998 Kun tyttö rakastuu
- 1998 Valloitan koko maailman
- 1999 Hääsunnuntai
- 1999 Olet kastetta maan
- 2001 Sun armoillas oonTänä yönä, Kuuntelitko sydäntäs
- 2001 All My Life:Näkemiin (with Helmut Lotti)
- 2002 Kengän kopinaa
- 2003 Nauran ja rakastan
- 2003 Voitko vain unohtaa
- 2003 Uudet tähdet (only for radio)
- 2005 Niin
- 2005 Avaruus
- 2007 Penkki, puu ja puistotie (only for radio)
- 2007 Jokainen hetki (only for radio)
- 2009 Yövieras/Minä taistelen

Downloads

- 2003 Uudet tähdet
- 2005 Niin
- 2005 Avaruus

Theatre

- 1997–1998 "Singing Raindrops", Lahti City Theatre
- 2000 "My Fair Lady", Turku Summer Theatre
- 2005–2006 "Sound of Music", Seinäjoki City Theatre
- 2007 "Sound of Music", Imatra City Theatre
- 2008 "Dirty Rotten Scoundrels", Tampere Workers' Theatre
- 2010 "Ava and Frank", Tampere Workers' Theatre

== Guest appearances ==
- 2001 Helmut Lotti Goes Classic III (Arja sings a duet with Hemut Lotti on one track – All My Life:Näkemiin. This duet only appears on the version of Helmut Lotti Goes Classic III sold in Finland: versions sold in other countries have other tracks in its place)

== Awards ==
- Tango Queen (1989)
- White Rose "Female solo artist of the year" (1991)
- Emma "Female solo artist of the year" (1991)
- Dean Martin Boozing Society "Entertainer of the year" (1991)
- World Music Awards Monte-Carlo "Best selling artist of the year" (1992)
- Kullervo Foundation (2004)
- Tango Finlandia (2006)

== Name ==
Arja's name is a modern made-up Finnish name. It first appears in Eino Leino´s poem Arja and Selinä of 1916; but the Arja in the poem is a boy. The Finns soon decided that Arja was more suitable as a girl's name. The -a ending is of no significance: the Finnish language has no genders, not even for people. There is a Russian name, variously transliterated as Arija, Arja, and Ara, which is a variant of Ariadne. Arja was most popular as a girl's name between 1940 and 1965. Other famous Arjas from this period are Arja Saijonmaa (b. 1944), Arja Havakka (b. 1944), and Arja Sipola (b. 1956).

== See also ==
- List of best-selling music artists in Finland
