= Jean Theslöf =

Finnish sports shooter

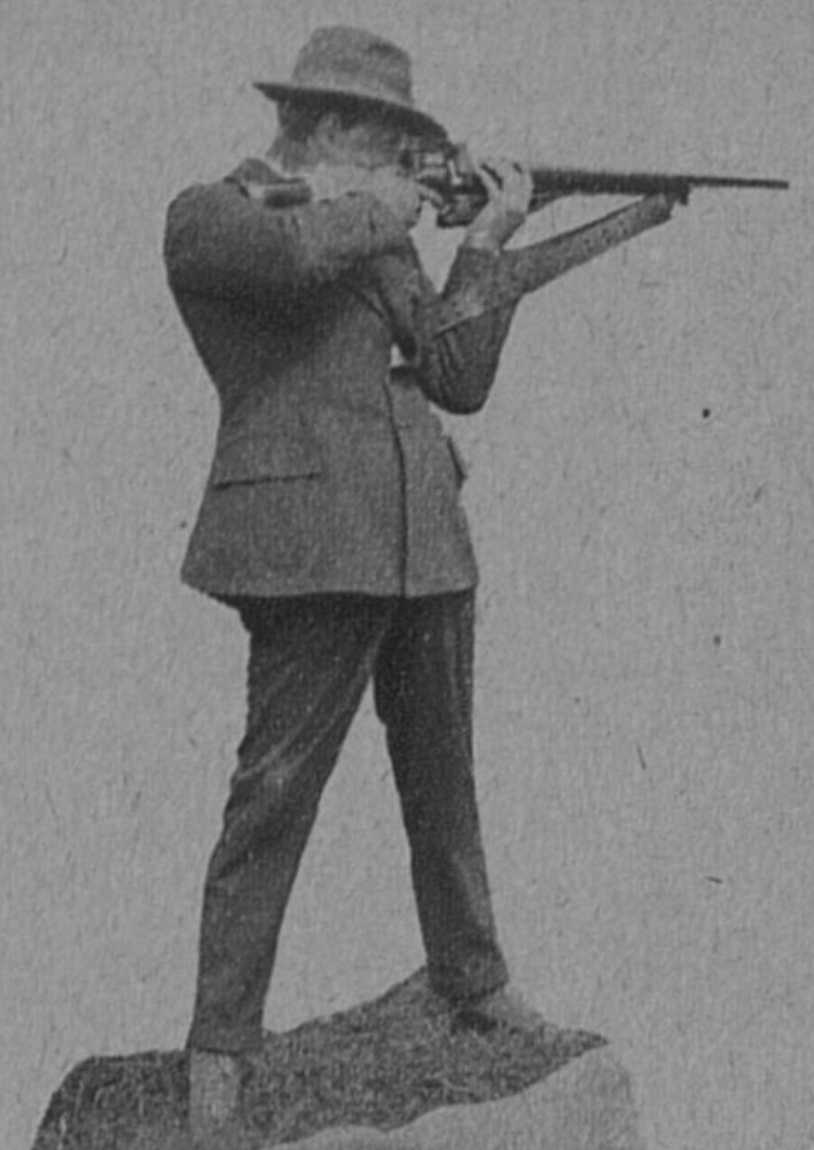
- Jean Theslöf at a shooting competition in 1923

Personal information
- Born: 25 June 1884; Oulu, Finland
- Died: 30 March 1966 (aged 81)

Sport
- Sport: Sports shooting

Jean Theslöf (25 June 1884 – 30 March 1966) was a Finnish sports shooter and singer. He competed in four events at the 1924 Summer Olympics. In 1925 Theslöf moved to the United States. He was a baritone, and he founded a singing school in New York and recorded almost 60 songs during his career. Theslöf sometimes recorded under the pseudonym "Muhoksen Janne."
