= Kari Peitsamo =

Finnish musician (born 1957)

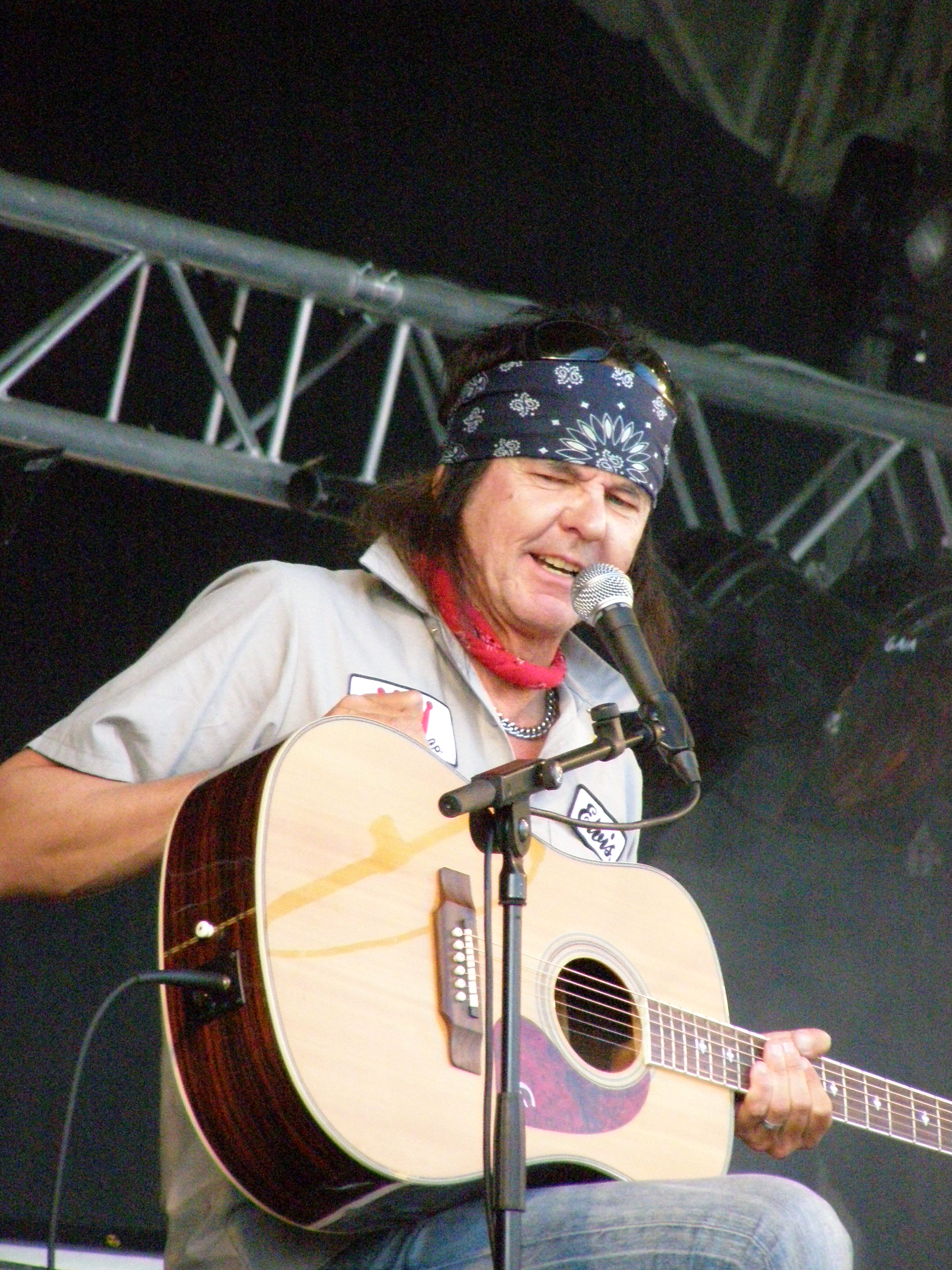

Background information
- Also known as: Joe-poika, Dr. Hong
- Born: 26 August 1957 (age 68); Nokia, Finland
- Genres: rock
- Occupations: musician, songwriter
- Instruments: guitar, bass, vocals, violin, drums, percussion, keyboards, fiddle, harmonica, kazoo, sampler
- Years active: 1977–present
- Labels: Love Records (1977–1979); Johanna (1979–1981); Poko Rekords (1982–1984); Johanna Kustannus (1985–2006); Rocket (2007–)

Kari Juhani Valdemar Peitsamo (born 26 August 1957) is a Finnish musician whose style has changed over the years from acoustic avant-garde pop to electric rock. His best-known song is probably "Kauppaopiston naiset" (Women of business school) from 1977.

Kari Peitsamo started his career with the EP Kari Peitsamo ja Ankkuli, which was created with the assistance of Juuso Nordlund and Kaj Martin, the backing group of Juice Leskinen, on the studio time left over from Leskinen. Kari Peitsamo's debut album Jatsin syvin olemus (1977) was still performed as a trio but the following albums would be solos where Peitsamo performed his songs accompanied only by an acoustic guitar. Later on, Peitsamo's acoustic guitar was switched to an electric one, and he was joined by the band Ankkuli, with its other members Harri Siirtola (bass) and Yrjö Majamaa (drums).

After this Peitsamo, who had recorded for Love Records, moved to Poko Records, and changed his band to Kari Peitsamo Revival, which was influenced by Creedence Clearwater Revival and Status Quo (Peitsamo also translated songs by both bands into Finnish). After the Revival period, Peitsamo played rock with his new band Kari Peitsamon Skootteri between 1985 and 1994. Another ensemble of his, Kari Peitsamo & Hirttämättömät, also released one album in 1998, called Bubblegum Warriors In Faded Jeans.

Kari Peitsamo is known for his vast productivity; for example, as many as six albums of his came out during the years 1993 and 1994. However, during the later years Peitsamo's musical activities have receded, and he has worked, among other things, as a grave digger and as a candidate for the Communist Party of Finland in the 2003, 2007 and 2011 parliamentary elections, as well as the municipal elections and elections for the European parliament in 2004 and 2009.

Many of Peitsamo's most famous songs are short rock songs with somewhat peculiar lyrics. His debut album contains a song called "Uskon Beatleksiin" (I Believe in the Beatles) in which the singer is rejected by his girlfriend but he is not desperate because he believes that some day The Beatles will descend from the heaven and bring peace to the world. The title track of the debut album is about jazz music, declaring that the deepest nature of jazz is unknown. In addition to his typical absurdism and oddities, Peitsamo has also written political songs, some of which are anthems to his preferred ideology, communism, for example "Liityn SKP:hen" (I join to SKP) and "Back in the DDR".

In 2013 Peitsamo started studying theology in the University of Helsinki.

In 2019 his politics took a rightward turn resulting in him being uninvited from Ämy music festival for comments he made about multiculturalism and the Christchurch mosque shootings. The same year he was granted an artists' pension.

== Discography ==
=== Studio albums ===
- Kari Peitsamo ja Ankkuli: Jatsin syvin olemus (1977)
- Kari Peitsamo ja Ankkuli: Vedestä nousee kasvi (1978)
- Kari Peitsamo ja Ankkuli: Kari Kolmas (1978)
- Kari Peitsamo ja Ankkuli: Kari Peitsamo ja Ankkuli (1979)
- Pölypilleri (1979)
- Levylaulaja (1980)
- Kari Peitsamo ja Ankkuli: Greatest Hits (1980)
- Gulliverin retket (1981)
- Kari Peitsamo ja Ankkuli: Vallankumous (1981)
- Kari Peitsamo Revival: Jokivarren jytäorkesteri (1982)
- Kari Peitsamo Revival: Pieni suuri show (1983)
- Kari Peitsamo Revival: Rokkiletti (1984)
- Älä koskaan laula kantria (1985)
- Kari Peitsamon Skootteri: Kari Peitsamon Skootteri (1985)
- Kari Peitsamon Skootteri: Amatöörirakastaja (1986)
- Kari Peitsamon Skootteri: The 10th Anniversary Album (1987)
- Kari Peitsamon Skootteri: Vedestä nousee hai (1988)
- Kari Peitsamon Skootteri: Hämeen nopein (1988)
- Kari Peitsamon Skootteri: Rankat ankat (1989)
- Kadonnutta aikaa etsimässä (1989)
- Kari Peitsamon Skootteri: Hellsinkin' (1990)
- Kari Peitsamon Skootteri: Groovers' Paradise (1990)
- Kari Peitsamon Skootteri: Plays Wigwam (1991)
- Kari Peitsamon Skootteri: Sergeant Rocker Rides Again (1991)
- The Fool (1992)
- Kari Peitsamon Skootteri: Natural Boogie (1993)
- Kari Peitsamon Skootteri: Vi skall spela rock (1993)
- I'm Down (1994)
- How I Won the War (1994)
- Kari Peitsamo & Aku Ankkuli: Dr. Rockfinger & Outlaws Boys (1994)
- Before They Make Me Run (1995)
- Good Vibrations – the 20th Anniversary Album (1997)
- Peace, Love & Understanding – the Xmas Album (1997)
- Kari Peitsamo & Hirttämättömät: Bubblegum Warriors in Faded Jeans (1998)
- Hoodoo (1998)
- Kari Peitsamo & Hirttämättömät: Brono Starr's Rock'n'roll Roadside Attraction (1999)
- Retkibanaani feat. Kari Peitsamo: Blitzkrieg Boogie – Highway 61 Revisited (2000)
- Pelle Show (2001)
- Taistelujen tiellä (2004)
- Kari Peitsamo & Freud Marx Engels & Jung: Amerikkalaisia unelmia (2005)
- No Mercy (2005)
- Kari Peitsamo & Aku Ankkuli: Für Elise (2006)
- The 30th Anniversary Album (2007)
- Kari Peitsamo & Risto: The Second Coming of Mr. Jesus H. Christ (2007)
- Kari Peitsamon Skootteri: Liskon laki (2008)
- Kari Peitsamo: Takaisin Itä-Saksaan (2009)
- Kari Peitsamo (2009)
- Black Album (2010)
- Kari Peitsamo & Straight Perverts: The Unparalleled Adventures Of One Hans Pfaall (2010)
- Kari Peitsamo Road Hogs: In Memory of Rigger Dan (2011)
- Kari Peitsamo Road Hogs: Rautahepo (2012)
- Kari Peitsamo Road Hogs: Kitarani haluaa rakastella äitiäsi rajusti (2012)
- Kari Peitsamo Road Hogs: Pahat pojat ovat jälleen täällä (2013)
- Sokea Joe (2014)
- Maan alla (2016)
- Tuomo, laita aika hiljaiselle tää kazoo (2016)

=== Live albums ===
- From Toijala with Love (2008)

=== EP's ===
- Kari Peitsamo ja Ankkuli: Kari Peitsamo ja Ankkuli (1977)

The songs can also be found from Jatsin syvin olemus album

- Kari Peitsamo ja Ankkuli: Peitsamon jälkeenjääneet nauhat (1978)
- Kari Peitsamo ja Ankkuli: Puinen levy (1978)
- Kari Peitsamo ja Ankkuli: Sian raato kääntää hitaasti kasvonsa valoon päin (1979)
- Kari Peitsamon Skootteri: Kari Peitsamon Skootteri (1986)

The songs can also be found from The 10th Anniversary Album

- Kari Peitsamo Revival: Poko-klassikko (1987)

Compilation EP

- Kari Peitsamo & Risto: Gotta Build a Railroad, Gotta Build a Train (2007)
- Kari Peitsamo: Takaisin Itä-Saksaan 7-inch (2009)

=== Compilations ===
- Kari Peitsamo ja Ankkuli: Kari Peitsamo 1977–1981 (1981)
- Kari Peitsamon Skootteri: Are You Experienced? The Voodoo Collection (1991)
- Kari Peitsamon Skootteri: Memories (1992)
- Kari Peitsamo Revival: Jytäorkesteri tulee taas (1993)
- Lähde autoiluretkelle suureen etelän kanjoniin – Kaikkien aikojen parhaat (2003)
- Kari Peitsamon Skootteri: On pakko vatkaa (2008)
- Kari Peitsamo: Hello, Kottarainen – Rocket Anthology 2007–2010 (2010)
- Kari Peitsamo: Se on vain rokkia (Rocket Records, 2 CDs, 2011)
- Kari Peitsamo: 20X Kari Peitsamo (2013)

=== Bibliography ===
- Taas koirat nuo nään kävelyllä (1978) – lyrics collection

includes lyrics from the Jatsin syvin olemus-, Peitsamon jälkeenjääneet nauhat-, Vedestä nousee kasvi- and Kari Kolmas albums

- Muut pojat lahjaks saivat lennokin (1979) – lyrics collection

includes lyrics from the Kari Peitsamo ja Ankkuli-, Sian raato kääntää hitaasti kasvonsa valoon päin- and Pölypilleri albums

- Maan alla (1980) – lyrics and prose poems

includes previously unreleased poems and short novels

- Vain aurinko on kuumin seuranaan (1981) – lyrics collection

includes lyrics from the Kultakuoriainen-biisin sekä Levylaulaja-, Greatest Hits- ja Gulliverin retket albums

- Roo Ketvel & Kari Peitsamo: Peitsamo: Runoja ja esseitä (1990) – poems and essays
- Kari Peitsamon pieni punainen kirja (2007) – lyrics collection

includes lyrics from albums released between 1977 and 2006. Foreword: Juha Rantala.
