= Mika Järvinen (musician) =

Finnish musician and writer

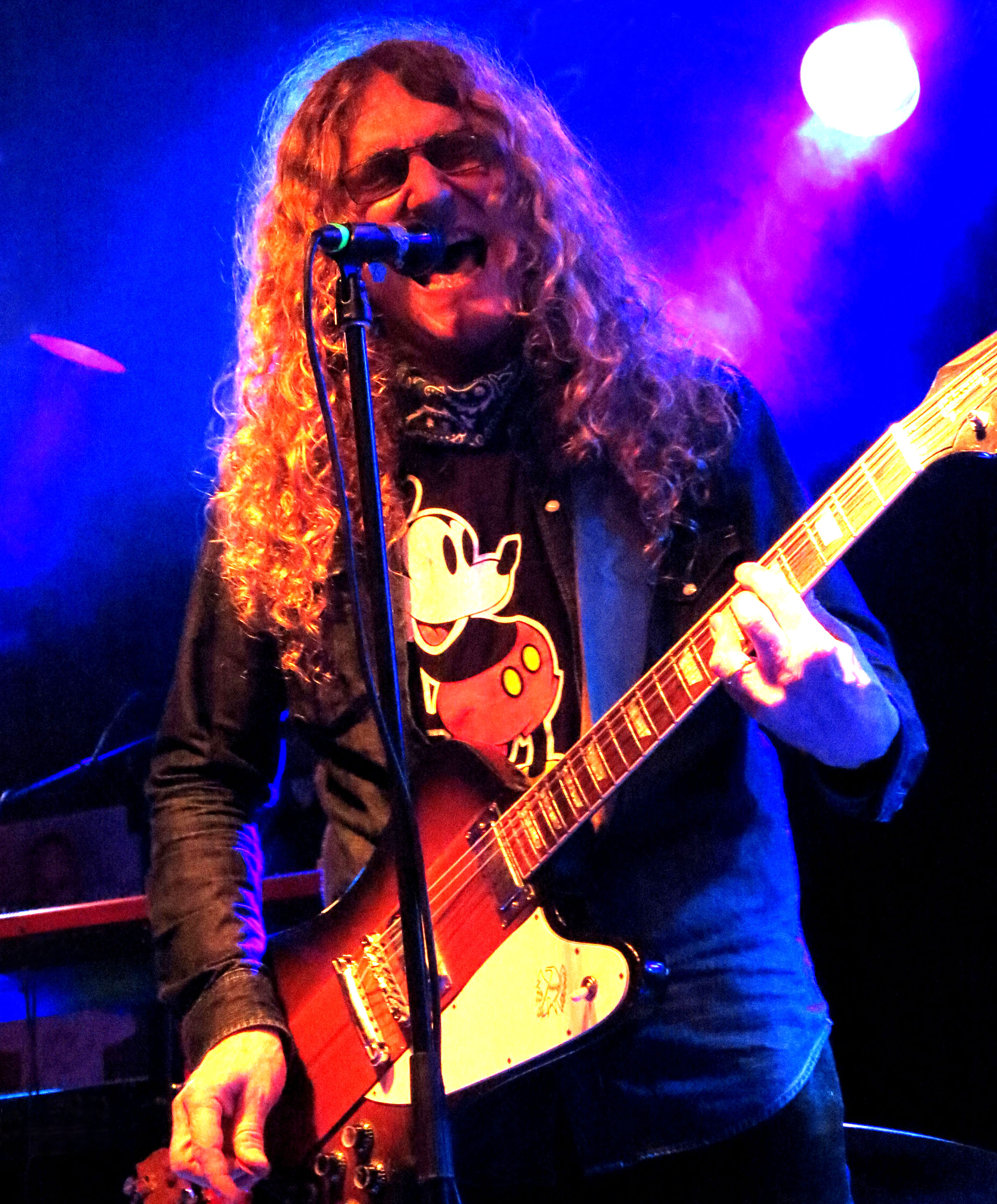
- Mika Järvinen performing at On the Rocks, Helsinki, in 2016

Background information
- Born: 1965; Helsinki, Finland
- Origin: Helsinki, Finland
- Occupation(s): singer, songwriter, guitarist
- Years active: 1990–present

Mika Järvinen (born 1965) is a Finnish rock musician, singer, guitarist, songwriter and author, who is known especially as the front man of the band Five Fifteen. Järvinen has performed with many different artists and bands in Finland, Mexico, United States, Germany, France, Belgium and Scandinavia.

Järvinen's first recording was the single "Nirvana" with 5.15, which later would spell its name as Five Fifteen. Järvinen performed with Five Fifteen during 1994–2006. The band made its comeback in 2017, supporting Ken Hensley at the Tavastia Club in Helsinki. After that the band has mainly performed in Helsinki.

Since 2005, Järvinen has also performed with the band Crazy World. His bandmates here include Esa Kotilainen, Timo Kämäräinen, Anssi Nykänen and Lauri Porra.

Järvinen is also known as author and translator. He has written a book on Uriah Heep and another one on Deep Purple. He has also translated into Finnish a book by Stephen Davis on Led Zeppelin.

Järvinen has worked as a radio presenter, selling gigs at an even agency, tour manager, sound technician, lights man, tennis teacher and a disc jockey. He has cooperated with Brian Robertson and Nik Turner, with whom Five Fifteen recorded in 2000 the live album Silver Machine at the Tavastia Club. Other musicians, with whom Järvinen has performed, include former Uriah Heep members Ken Hensley, Lee Kerslake, Paul Newton and John Lawton.

== Works ==
Selected discography Five Fifteen Studio albums Progressive Hardrock Beyond the Mainstream (1994, Bluelight Records) Armageddon Jam Session Number Four (1995, Bluelight Records) Psychedelic Singalongs for Stadiums (1997, Blastic Heaven Records) Six Dimensions of the Electric Camembert (1998, Record Heaven) Death of a Clown (2001, Record Heaven) The Man Who Sold Himself (2004) Alcohol (2007, Sweden Rock Records)

EPs and singles Kylmemmäksi kuin jää/Nirvana (1990, 7", Bluelight Records) The Ohms Law (1991, 12", Bluelight Records) Kesäinen Stadi/Shakinpelaaja (1991, 7", Bluelight Records) Sleep Walker/Nightingale Waltz (7", Bluelight Records) Silver Machine, featuring Nik Turner and Brian Robertson (2000, EP, Record Heaven) Innocence Is No Excuse (2000, single, Record Heaven Music) Stone Cold Heartbreaker (2001, single, Record Heaven) The Prostitute (2002, single, Record Heaven Music) Jesus Went to New York City, featuring Brian Robertson (2004, single, Ranch Records) Tales, featuring Ken Hensley and Maria Hänninen (2020, 12", Turenki Records)

Crazy World Studio albums Crazy World (2005, CD, Album, Spinefarm) Crazy World (2009, 2xLP, Album, Jäänsärkijä Records) The Return of the Clown (2012, CD, Album, Presence Records) The Return of the Clown (2012, 2xLP, Album, Jäänsärkijä Records)

=== As author ===
- Uriah Heep: Easy Livin': Ken Hensleyn vuodet 1970–1980 [‘Uriah Heep. Easy Livin' — the Ken Hensley years 1970–1980’]. Helsinki: Johnny Kniga. 2013. ISBN 978-951-0-39014-6.
- Deep Purple: Highway Star. Ritchie Blackmoren vuodet 1968–1993 [‘Deep Purple: Highway Star. The Ritchie Blackmore Years 1968–1993’]. Helsinki: Johnny Kniga. 2013. ISBN 978-951-0-41537-5.

=== As translator ===
- Davis, Stephen (2005). Jumalten vasara: saaga Led Zeppelinistä [‘Hammer of the Gods. The Saga of Led Zeppelin’]. Helsinki: Johnny Kniga. ISBN 978-951-0-44199-2.

== Sources ==
- Scott Heller, liner notes for Five Fifteen: The Man Who Sold Himself.
- Liner notes for The Sensational Five Fifteen (Bluelight Records).
- Liner notes for Crazy World (Spinefarm).
