= Kari Nurmela =

Finnish baritone (1933–1984)

Kari Nurmela (26 May 1933 – 21 January 1984) was a Finnish dramatic baritone of note.

Born in Viipuri, Finland, Nurmela made his operatic debut as the Conte di Luna, in Il trovatore, at Helsinki, in 1961. He went on to appear at Prague, Marseille, Nancy, Frankfurt, Hamburg, Munich, Stuttgart, Bologna, Florence, Genoa, Palermo, Venice, Trieste, Lisbon, Geneva, Zurich, Seattle, and San Diego, as well as the Festival at Orange. He was heard in the leading baritone roles of Curlew River, Don Pasquale, Roberto Devereux, Pagliacci (as Tonio), Cavalleria rusticana, L'Orfeo, Don Giovanni, Le nozze di Figaro (as the Conte Almaviva), La bohème, Madama Butterfly, Il tabarro, Tosca, Elektra, Un ballo in maschera, Don Carlos, Ernani, Falstaff (as Ford), La forza del destino, Nabucco, Otello, La traviata, Tannhäuser, etc.

In 1976, for RAI, Nurmela sang in Katerina Ismailova, with Gloria Lane and William Cochran, conducted by Yuri Ahronovich. In 1979, he recorded, for EMI, Tonio in Pagliacci, opposite Renata Scotto, José Carreras, and Sir Thomas Allen, under the bâton of Riccardo Muti.

Kari Nurmela unexpectedly succumbed to cerebral bleeding, in Helsinki, Finland.
