= Harri Nuutinen =

Finnish singer (born 1962)

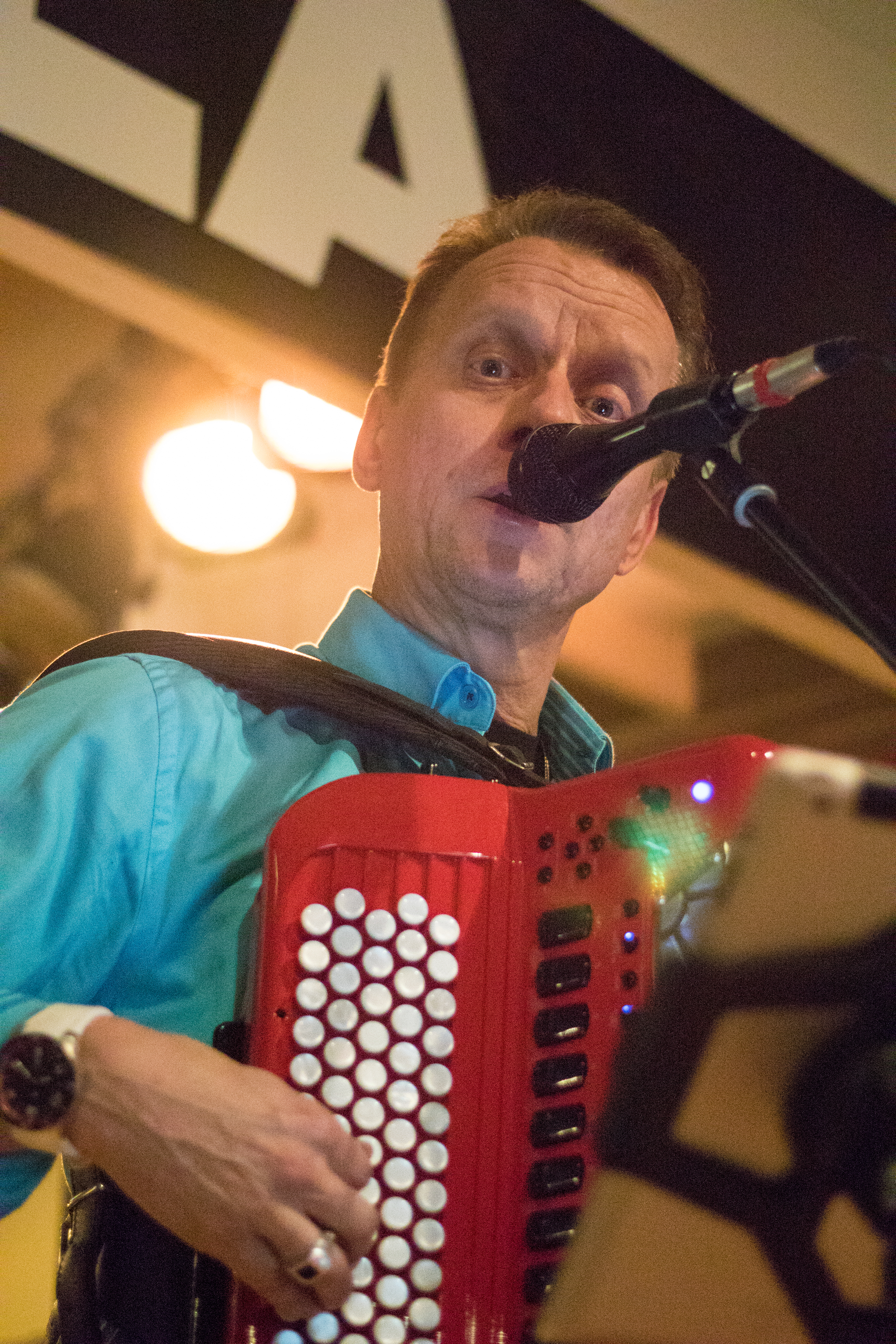
Harri Nuutinen singing

Harri Nuutinen (born 3 October 1962 in Helsinki) is a Finnish singer. He won the popular song vocals SM Contests old dance series in 1977.

== Discography ==
- Harri Nuutinen (1977)
- Sept ruskan time (1978)
- Laulellen and playing (1979)
- Rose friend (1980)
- Callback hanurin (1982)
- Harri Nuutinen (1982)
- Harri Nuutinen (1980)
- Dance magic is (1999)
