= Finnish tango =

Music and dance form

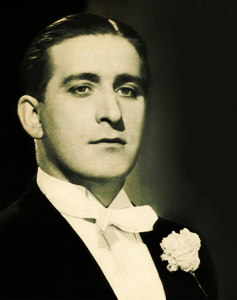
- Henry Theel, a well-known voice in Finnish tango
- Stylistic origins: Argentine tango Finnish folk music
- Typical instruments: Voice; Violin; Accordion; Piano; Bass; Percussion

Finnish tango (Finnish: suomalainen tango), or FINtango, music is an established variation of the Argentine tango but whose rhythm follows the Ballroom tango. It was one of the most popular music forms for decades in Finland.

== History ==
=== Early history ===
Brought to Europe in the 1910s, and to Finland itself in 1913, by travelling musicians, Finns began to take up the form and write their own tangos in the 1930s. The first Finnish tango was written by Emil Kauppi in 1914 for a film called Salainen perintömääräys (meaning The Secret Testament). It features a typical Finnish rhythm pattern with habanera.

=== Popularity ===
In the 1920s the tango was danced exclusively by Helsinki’s bohemians. By the 1940s about half of the entries on the popular music charts were occupied by tangos, and the post war period saw tangos spread from a popular urban phenomenon to their enthusiastic adoption by the countryside as well. Finnish tango peaked in the late 1950s and early 1960s.

== Musical Characteristics ==
Special characteristics of Finnish tango include the change of rhythm to beguine during chorus. Also habanera rhythm is often used. The bandoneon was replaced by the accordion and drums were added.

== Themes and Composition ==
The Finnish tango is distinguished from other forms of tango by its almost exclusive performance in minor keys and themes reflecting established conventions in Finnish folklore. As the head of the Finnish National Broadcaster's gramophone library explains, "The central themes of Finnish tango lyrics are love, sorrow, nature and the countryside. Many tangos express a longing for the old homestead, or a distant land of happiness. The changing seasons of Finnish nature are frequently used metaphors: the spring breaks the hold of the winter, and flowers appear, creating new expectations. Autumn rains and dark evenings are symbols of crushed hopes."

== Festivals ==
One of the highlights of Finnish summers is the Tangomarkkinat, or tango festival, held annually since 1985 in the central Finnish town of Seinäjoki. The festival attracts more than 100,000 participants annually (from a population of just over 5 million) and is capped by the coronation of the tango King and Queen, who receive much domestic media attention and often recording contracts as well. Another tango festival is the International Helsinki Frostbite Tango Festival. The city of Tampere hosts the much smaller annual Maailmantango (World of Tango festival).

== Famous Composers ==
The most well known Finnish tango composers are Olavi Virta ("Punatukkaiselle tytölleni"), Toivo Kärki ("Liljankukka") and Unto Mononen ("Satumaa").

== Tango, the dance ==
Tango was first performed in Finland by Finns in 1913. Since then tango has evolved in Finland to a distinctive form.

Finnish tango as a dance has characteristics that differ from both competitive and Argentine tango. There is a close contact in the pelvis, upper thighs, and the upper body. Finnish tango is often taught with a SSQQ (slow, slow, quick, quick) basic step sequence, with QQS or SQQ used for the beguine or habanera parts so often found in Finnish tango pieces, although a skilled dancer might use slows and quicks just as he wishes to match either the melody or the rhythm. Dips and rotations are frequent. There are no kicks or aerials in Finnish tango. Typically feet stay close to the floor, except in dips the follower might slightly raise the left leg.

Steps forward are mainly heel-leads. Only if a forward step is taken during a fall (descending from a rise), the ball touches the floor first. When moving backwards, the heel pushes off the floor. The step sequence may be executed either by closing the last quick step or by letting feet pass each other. The dance is horizontal with optional rises and falls; steps are low and to allow this, the dance position is low with the supporting leg bent. The passing leg moves quickly to rest for a moment close to the grounded leg. Compared to Argentine tango, Finnish tango is more related to (slow) foxtrot, but the feel is different because the weight shift happens close to the end of the beat and the pushing foot will accelerate only to pause next to the grounded one before it moves forward to a long step that is made even longer by pushing off the other leg in the end. Finnish tango requires a lot of space.

The Tangomarkkinat festival also hosts dancing competitions, among them Finnish tango. Non-Finnish contestants also participate.
