= List of Finnish operatic sopranos =

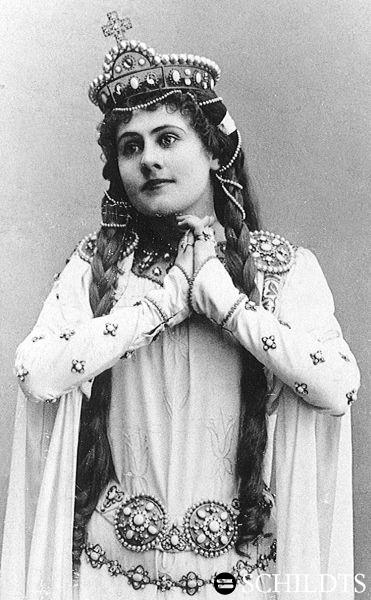
Aino Ackté in Wagner's Tannhäuser (1899)

This is a list of operatic sopranos and mezzo-sopranos who were born in Finland or whose work is closely associated with that country.

== A ==
- Aino Ackté (1878–1944), celebrated international soprano, performed at the Paris Opera, Metropolitan Opera and Covent Garden, co-founder of the Finnish Opera
- Emmy Achté (1859–1924), mezzo-soprano, first prima donna of the Finnish Opera from 1873 to 1878, thereafter voice teacher
- Alexandra Ahnger (1859–1940), mezzo-soprano with the Finnish Opera, soloist, voice teacher

== B ==
- Ida Basilier-Magelssen (1846–1928), soprano in concerts and opera, active in the Royal Swedish Opera and the Finnish Theatre

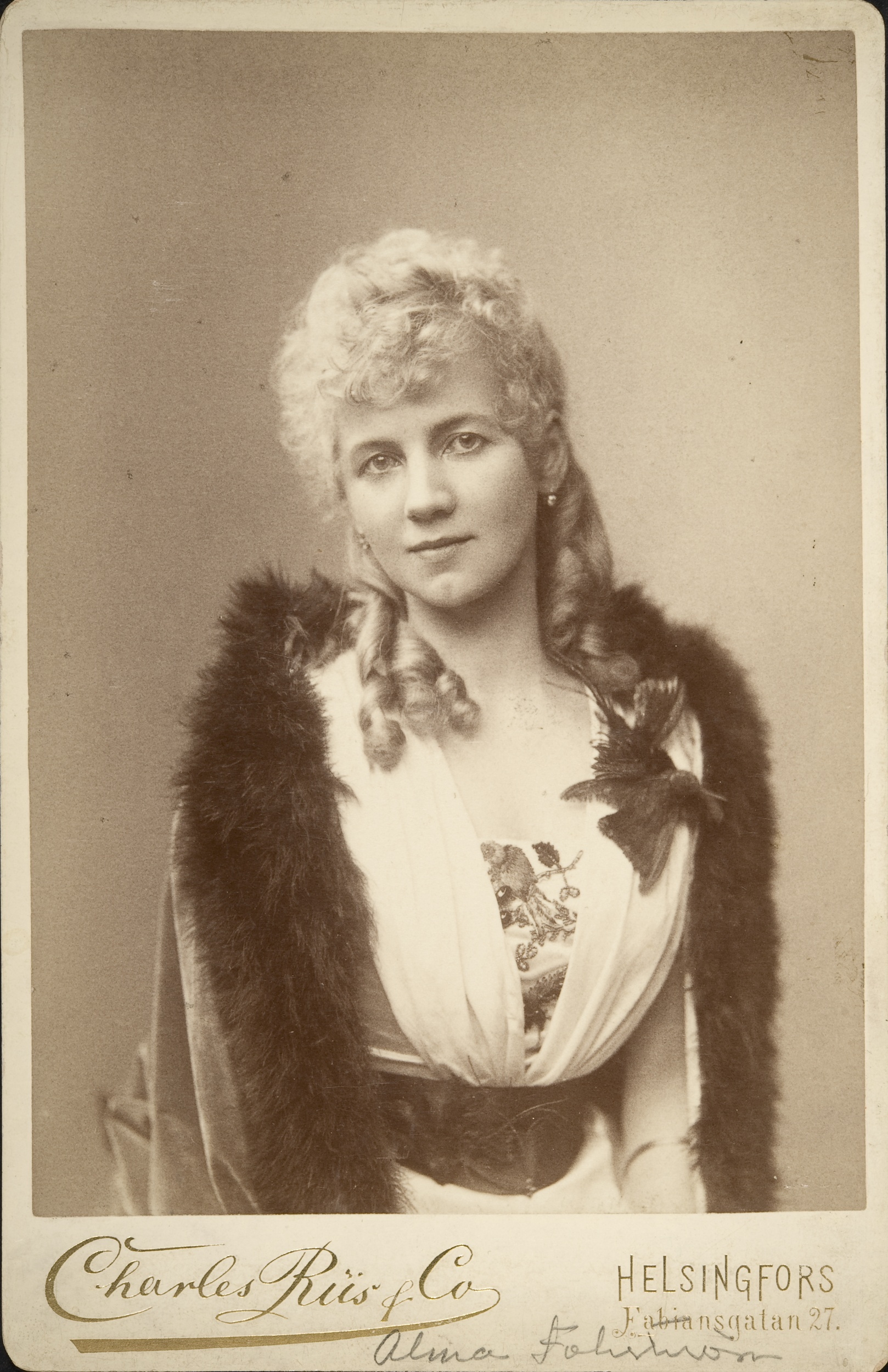
Alma Fohström

== E ==
- Maaria Eira (1924–1999), soprano performing in Italian opera and in musical films, later opera director
- Emma Engdahl-Jägerskiöld (1852–1930), soprano active in opera at Helsinki's Swedish Theatre, also sang in Stockholm and Oslo

== F ==
- Alma Fohström (1856–1936), popular operatic soprano, performing leading roles in opera houses around the world, including the Metropolitan Opera and the Bolshoi Theatre
- Elin Fohström (1868–1949), soprano, performed in Finland, Russia, the Baltic countries, Germany and Italy until 1897, thereafter voice teacher in Helsinki

== G ==
- Hanna Granfelt (1884–1952), soprano, successful in the early 20th century in Germany and later at the Finnish National Opera working with Sibelius
- Monica Groop (born 1958), mezzo-soprano with the Finnish National Opera, guest in Los Angeles, Paris, London and Salzburg

== H ==
- Katherine Haataja (born 1969), mezzo-soprano, formerly active in opera houses across Europe, now supports young singers though Operosa
- Anna Hagelstam (1883–1946), mezzo.soprano opera singer and songwriter

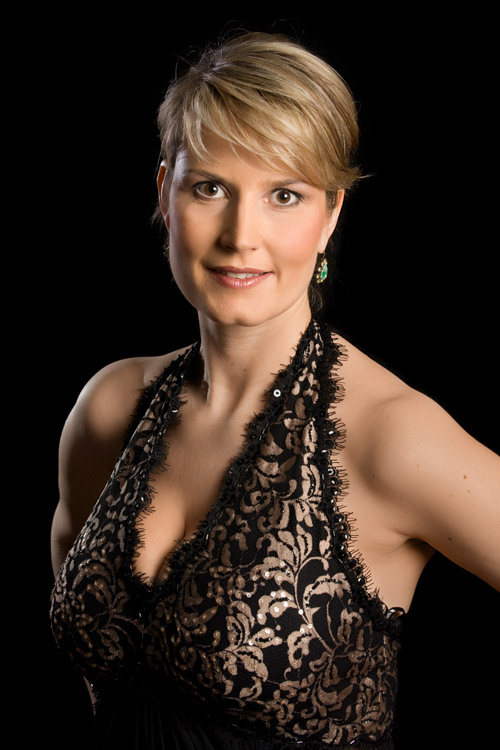
Camilla Nylund in 2008

== I ==
- Soile Isokoski (born 1957), lyric soprano in opera and concerts, performances across Europe and North America

== J ==
- Maikki Järnefelt (1871–1929), soprano remembered for her Wagnerian opera roles in Germany and Sweden and as a lied singer
- Helena Juntunen (born 1976), soprano with the Finnish National Opera, international soloist

== K ==
- Anu Komsi (born 1967), soprano performing in opera houses across Germany, international soloist with major orchestras

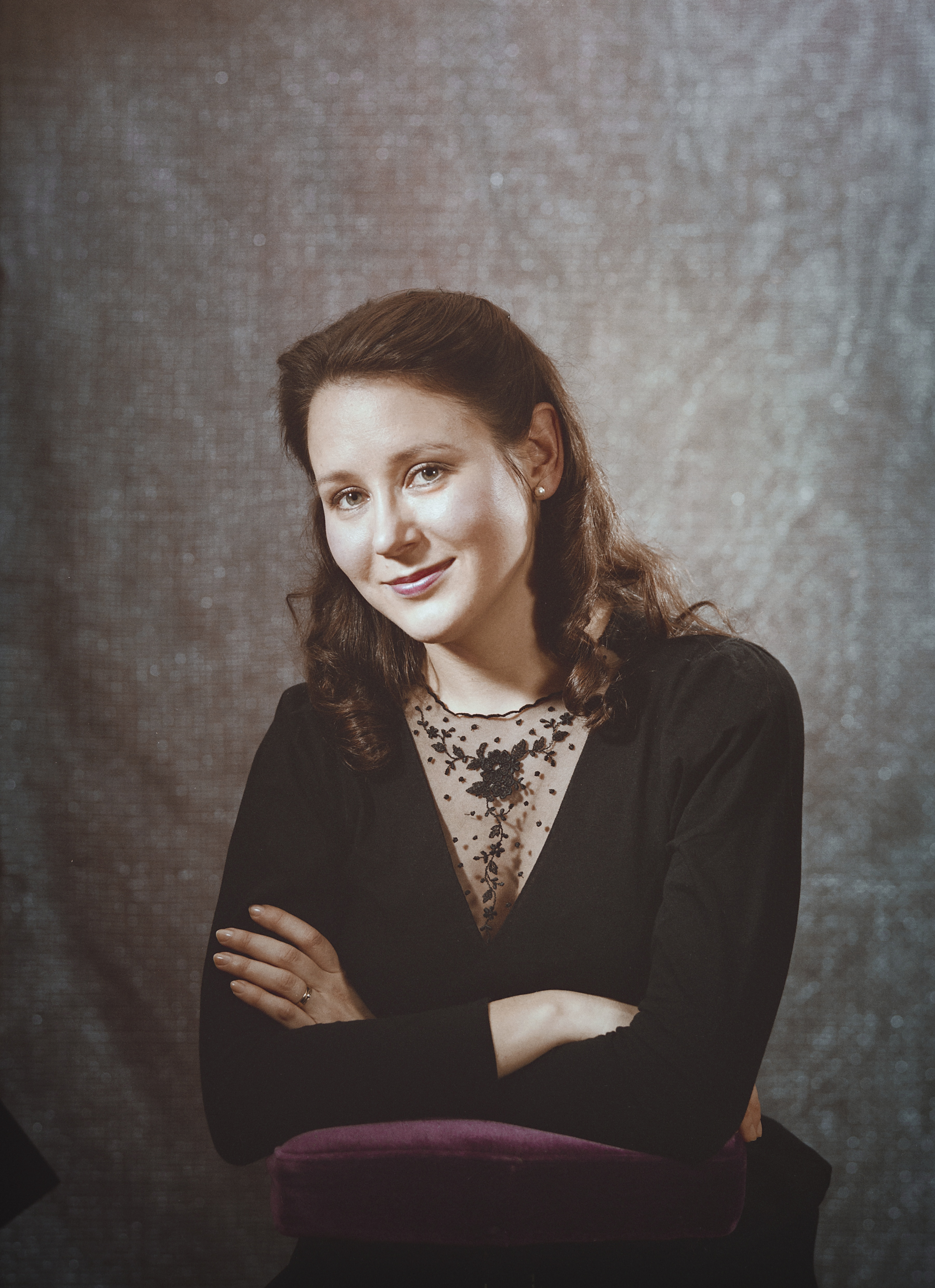
Monica Groop in 1990

== L ==
- Sofia Liljegren (1765–1795), Finnish-Swedish soprano who was a popular performer at the Royal Swedish Opera in the 1780s
- Tamara Lund (1941–2005), soprano, performed at the Finnish National Opera and at the Staatstheater in Munich

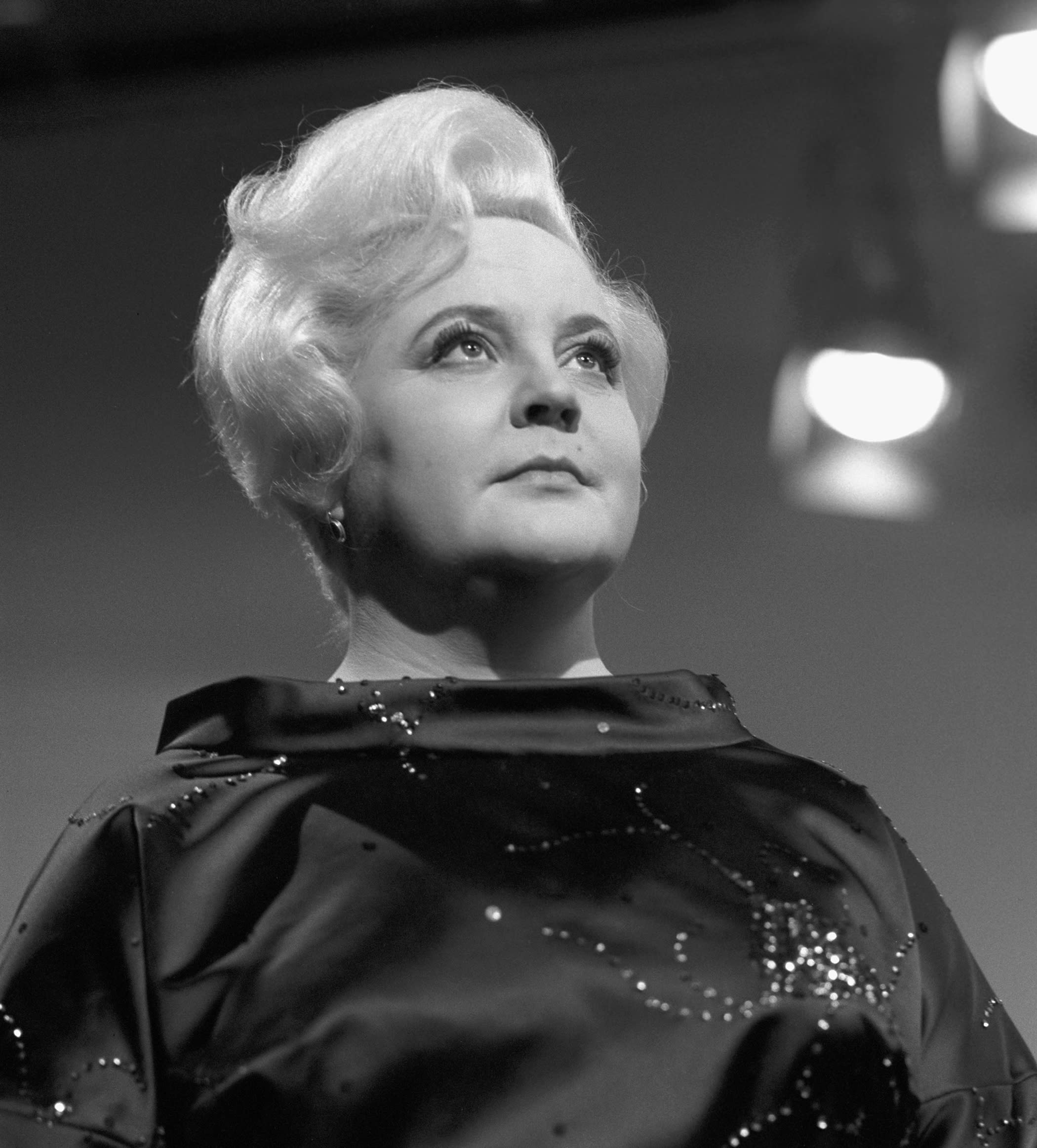
Anita-Valkki in 1964

== M ==
- Karita Mattila (born 1960), celebrated international operatic soprano, active mainly in Finland, Germany and the United States

== N ==
- Camilla Nylund (born 1968), dramatic lyric soprano performing mainly in German opera houses

== P ==
- Lilli Paasikivi (born 1965), mezzo-soprano, international opera singer and soloist, artistic director of the Finnish National Opera

== R ==
- Aulikki Rautawaara (1906–1990), soprano, remembered for singing works by Grieg and Sibelius, performed at Glyndebourne and in Europe's major opera houses
- Pia Ravenna (1894–1964), celebrated coloratura soprano, performed at the Finnish National Opera in 32 operas and operettas, also in Monte Carlo, Egypt and Italy

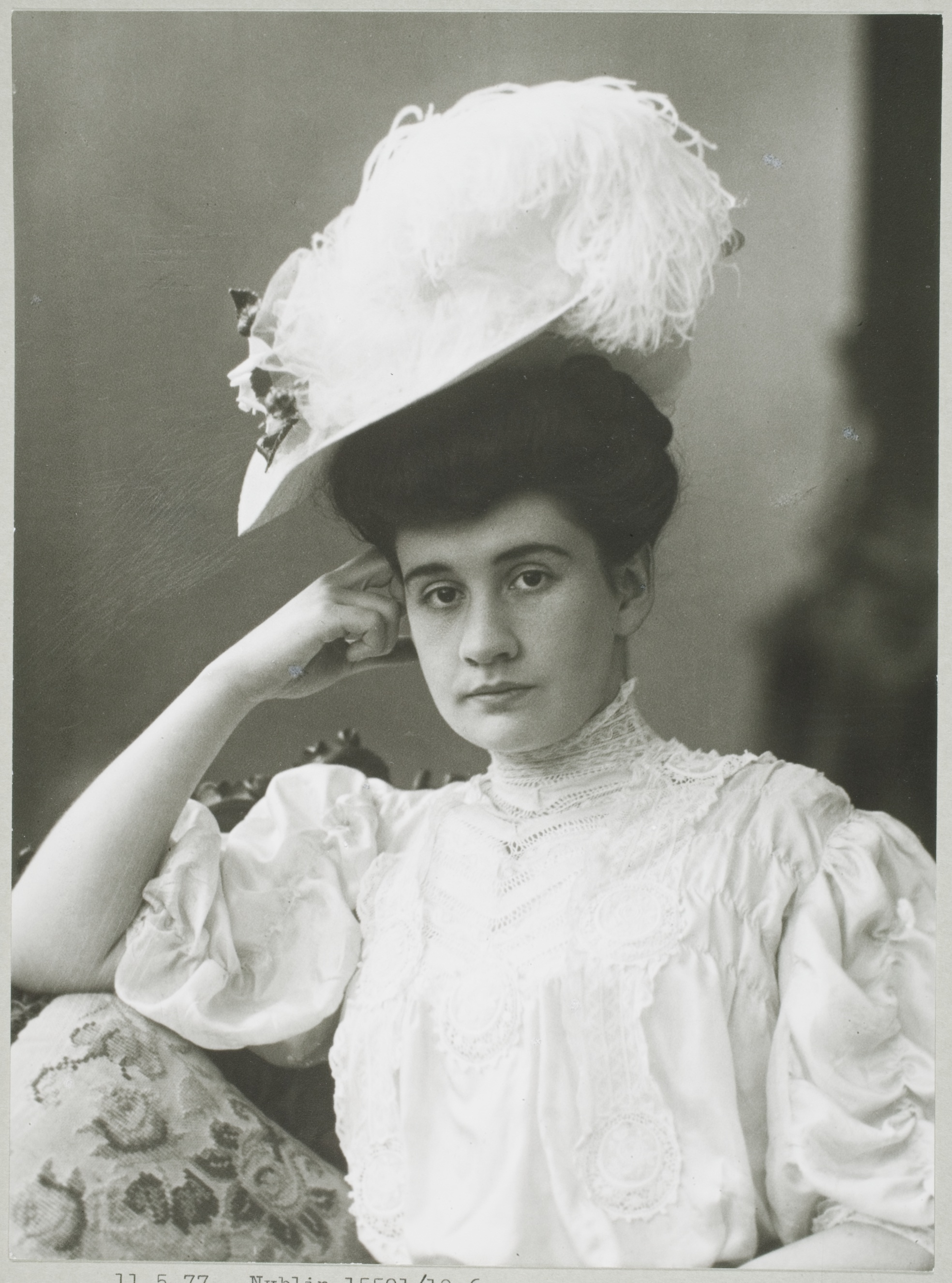
Irma Tervani in 1906

== S ==
- Johanna von Schoultz (1813–1863), soprano, performed at opera houses in Italy and at the Italian Opera in Paris

== T ==
- Tuuli Takala (born 1987), classical singer and operatic soprano, active in Finland and in many of Europe's leading opera houses
- Irma Tervani (1887–1936), mezzo-soprano with the Finnish Opera and the Dresden Royal Opera

== U ==
- Irma Urrila (born 1943), soprano, performed mainly in Helsinki, Oslo and Stockholm, known for her role as Pamina in Ingmar Bergman's film of Mozart's The Magic Flute

== V ==
- Taru Valjakka (born 1938), soprano, performed leading roles in the Finnish National Opera in the 1970s, also lied recitalist
- Anita Välkki (1926–2011), dramatic soprano, international career in major roles at leading opera houses, voice teacher from 1982
