= Irma Tervani =

Finnish contralto opera singer (1887–1936)

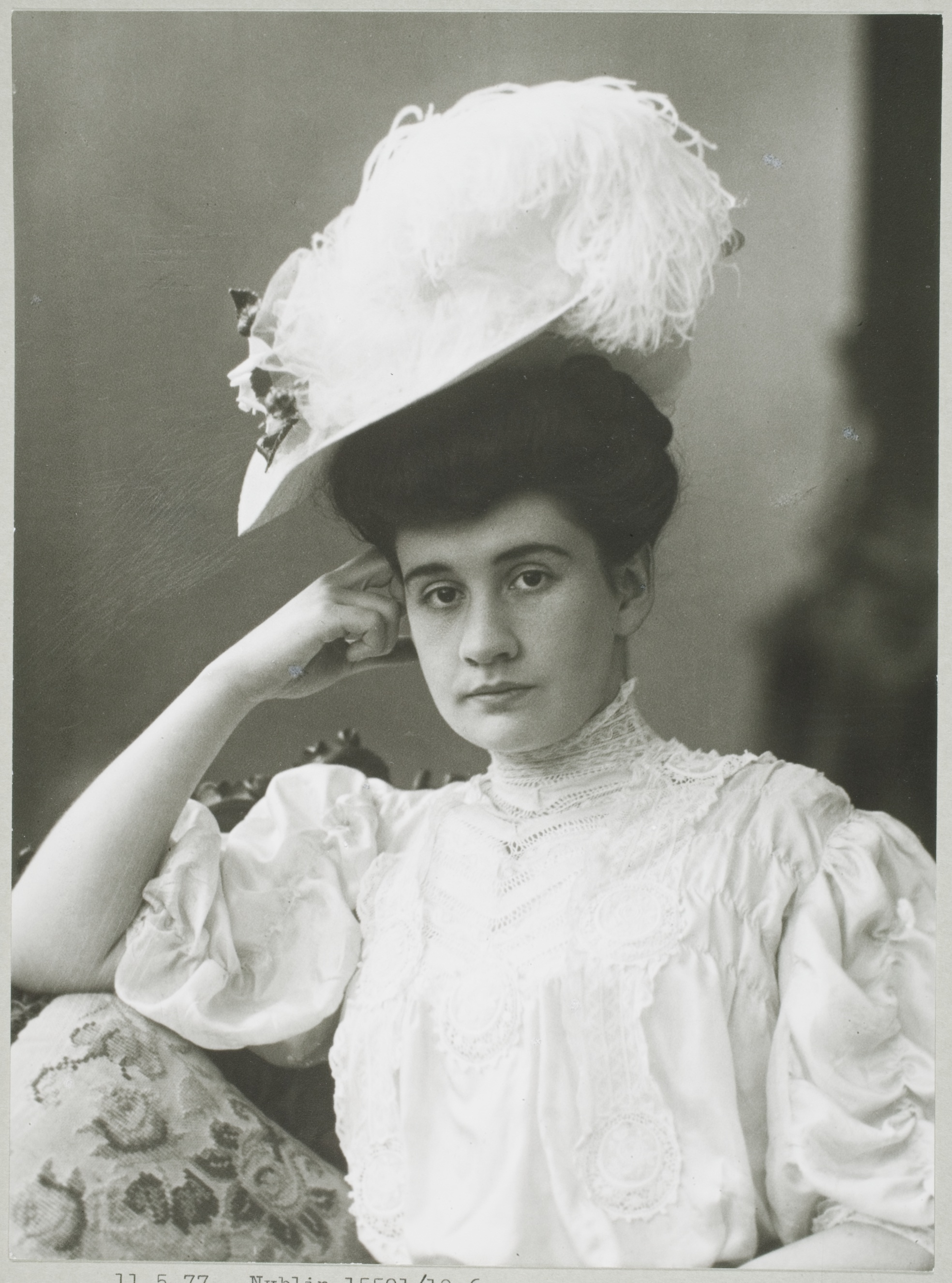
Irma Tervani (1906)

Irma Tervani, stage name of Irma Achté, (1887–1936) was a Finnish mezzo-soprano or contralto opera singer who performed at the Finnish Opera in Helsinki and at the Dresden Royal Opera. She is remembered for her interpretation of Carmen and for her Wagnerian roles.

== Biography ==
Born on 4 June 1887 in Helsinki, Irma Achté was the daughter of the opera singer Emmy Achté née Strömer and the conductor Lorenz Nicolai Achté. Her older sister, Aino Ackté, was a celebrated international operatic soprano. First taught by her mother (1905–07), she continued her studies at the Paris Conservatory under Edmond Duvernoy (1904–06) and in Dresden where she made her début at the Royal Opera in 1908 as Delilah in Saint-Saens's Samson and Delilah.

She also performed in other opera houses in Germany, notably in Frankfurt in 1910 where her interpretation of Carmen was particularly intense, attracting wide acclaim. She also starred in Gluck's Orfeo ed Euridice, Verdi's Il trovatore and Aida and in Wagner's operas. In Finland, she performed in Oskar Merikanto's opera Elinan surma in 1910 and in Carmen in 1912.

Tervani retired from the Dresden Opera in 1932 and moved with her family to Berlin where she died on 29 October 1936. She had been married to the theatre director Paul Wiecke since 1916 and had two children.
