= Ahnger =

Surname

Ahnger is a surname. Notable people with this name include:

- Alexandra Ahnger (1859–1940), Finnish opera singer and instructor
- Arthur Ahnger (1886–1940), Finnish sailor
- Constantin Ahnger (1855–1942), Finnish engineer and scientist
