= Hanna Granfelt =

Finnish opera singer

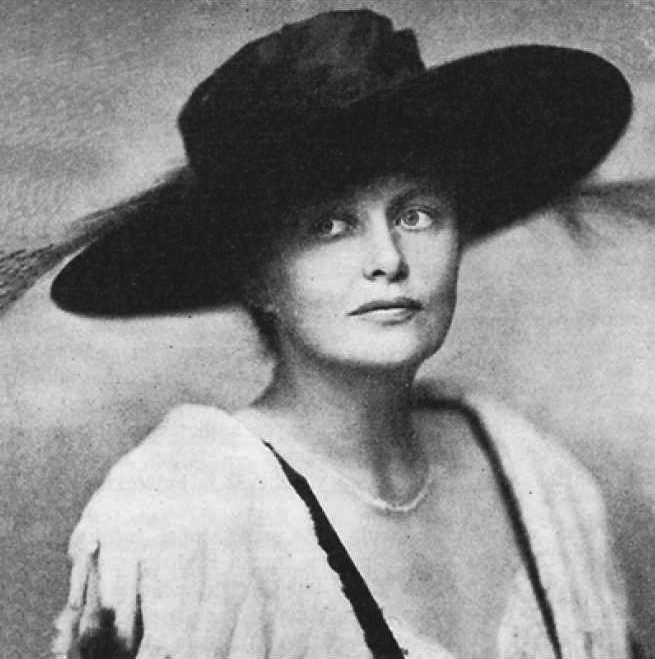
- Hanna Granfelt pictured in the c. 1920s
- Born: 2 June 1884; Sakkola, Grand Duchy of Finland
- Died: 3 November 1952 (aged 68); Helsinki, Finland
- Spouse: Heikki Tuominen (m. 1930; div. 1942)

Hanna Lilian Granfelt (2 June 1884 — 3 November 1952) was a Finnish operatic soprano and a leading singer of the early 20th century Finland, admired by the likes of Jean Sibelius and Richard Strauss.

== Early life and education ==
Hanna Granfelt was born to Arthur Granfelt and Hanna Maria née Hahl, a wealthy farming family in the small town of Sakkola on the Karelian Isthmus; however, after her father died while she was still young, her mother moved the family to Helsinki. Her mother was an amateur opera singer, and came from a musical family.

Granfelt showed interest in drama and music from an early age, and joined the Arkadia Theatre company already in her teens. She went on to train more formally drama at the Finnish National Theatre school, and singing under the tutelage of Alexandra Ahnger, before moving to Paris to study under the voice pedagogue Edmond Duvernoy. She also continued studying acting at the Louis Bremont drama school. Nevertheless, it soon became clear that her main talent was singing, which led her to choosing the career path of a professional opera singer rather than an actor.

== Career ==
Granfelt's public debut performance was in Helsinki in 1905, although she did not yet fully launch her career and instead returned to Paris to continue her studies.

From 1908 to 1910, she was appointed to her first professional posting at the Mannheim Court Opera, followed by the newly established Kurfürstenoper in Berlin from 1910 to 1911.

Granfelt auditioned with the composer Richard Strauss, who liked her so much that he personally offered her lead roles in at least three of his operas, Salome, Der Rosenkavalier and Ariadne auf Naxos, as well as inviting her as headliner to his tours of London (Royal Opera House) in 1913 and, with the Berlin State Opera, in Switzerland, in 1917.

She returned to Berlin for a longer attachment, this time at the State Opera (then Royal Opera), where she stayed for eight years from 1915 to 1923. She also made extensive tours and guest appearances around Germany and numerous other European countries, as well as the US in 1930.

Granfelt's repertoire comprised c. 50 roles, of which her more notable ones included Elsa in Lohengrin, Princess Elisabeth in Tannhäuser and the title role of Salome.

At the Finnish National Opera, she premiered 16 roles and gave nearly 100 performance between 1912 and 1930.

Granfelt also worked extensively with Finland's most famous composers of the time, Jean Sibelius and Oskar Merikanto: the former is said to have admired her greatly, and the latter often personally accompanied her on the piano at her concerts.

At the same time, it is also thought that she missed out on potentially significant career opportunities, including expected breakthroughs in Paris and New York, due to recurring health and nervous problems and stage fright getting the better of her, which she tried to mitigate through the use of alcohol and perhaps cocaine or other drugs, possibly thereby extenuating the problems.

She is known for her professional rivalry with the other Finnish major operatic diva of the time, Aino Ackte, eight years her senior.

Towards the end of her career, Granfelt suffered from health problems associated with, among other things, rheumatoid arthritis, and straight after her 1932 premiere in Aida at the Royal Swedish Opera she gave up stage work and concentrated instead on teaching, working mostly in Finland but also in Germany and Norway.Royal Swedish Opera One of her more notable students was the singer and later opera director Alfons Almi, often called the 'father of Finnish opera'.

== Voice ==
Granfelt's soprano voice has been described as luxurious and expressive, with a particularly wide vocal range, suited for both lyric and dramatic roles from light coloratura to the heaviest styles.

She was particularly noted for her interpretations of works by Wagner, Strauss, Puccini and Mozart, and was also recognized as a skilled performer of Lied.

She recorded a wide range of operatic arias and Lieds, as well as some folk music, from the 1910s to 1930s.

== Personal life ==
As early as 1906, Grantfelt purchased a house in her native Karelia, where she returned to rest and recuperate over the coming decades.

In 1912, Granfelt fell in love with the composer and conductor Robert Heumann, who nevertheless died two years later at in the early stages of World War I, triggering in her a period of depression.

In the 1920s she moved back to Finland, mainly to escape the German hyperinflation which had made life very difficult there.

Granfelt was reportedly charming and attractive, and courted by many of her day: it was even rumoured that the Finnish military leader and later President Mannerheim had in the 1920s considered proposing marriage to her.

In 1930, at the relatively late age of her mid-40s, she instead Granfelt married the singer Heikki Tuominen.

She suffered from various misfortunes throughout her life, including frequent bouts of ill health, alcohol problems and financial difficulties. In 1942, Granfelt and her husband were divorced.

In 1944, in the aftermath of the Continuation War, Granfelt lost her home and summer house in Karelia and was evacuated to elsewhere in Finland, where, despite her earlier fame and success, she lived out her remaining days withdrawn, alone and largely forgotten.
