= Pia Ravenna =

Finnish opera singer

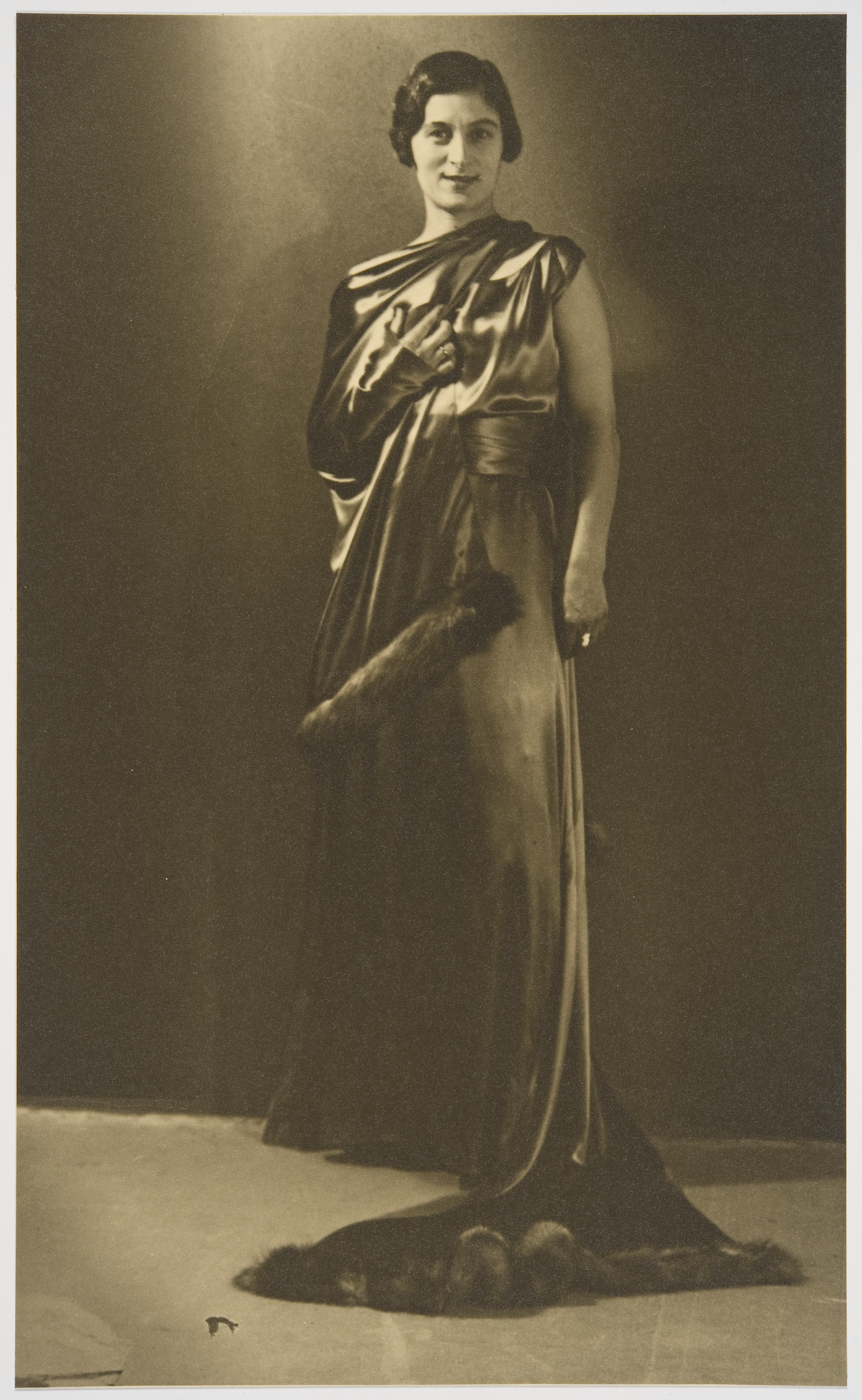
- Ravenna in the early 1930s
- Born: Hjördis Sophie Tilgmann; 25 October 1894; Helsinki
- Died: 19 October 1964 (aged 69); Helsinki
- Other names: Pian; The Nightingale of Finland
- Occupation: Singer
- Spouse: Alessio Costa
- Relatives: Arnold Tilgmann (brother)

Pia Ravenna (born Hjördis Sophie Tilgmann; 25 October 1894 – 19 October 1964) was a celebrated Finnish coloratura soprano who specialized in operatic works and was known as "the Nightingale of Finland". Her artist name, Pia Ravenna, was based on her nickname "Pian" and Ravenna was found on the map of Italy.

== Overview ==
Pia Ravenna had her debut in 1913 at the age of eighteen, and she gave her farewell concert in 1951. According to her own books, the coloratura soprano gave more than 800 performances in the span of 38 years, including 400 concerts and as many stage performances.

She was not internationally recognized. But, in Finland, she was a leading soprano of the National Opera for more than a decade. She was noted for her technical agility and pearly light coloratura voice combined excellent stage presence. She kept record of her own performances and she appeared in 32 different operas and operettas over the years.

== Biography ==
=== Early life ===
Born Hjördis Sophie Tilgmann, Pia Ravenna came from a Swedish-speaking musical family. Her brother, Arnold Tilgmann, was a tenor who combined a life in the printing business with a career on the operatic stage. Pia and Arnold gave concerts together. In 1935, at the Finnish National Opera they acted together, Pia as Rosina in Il barbiere di Siviglia and Arnold as Almaviva together with Feodor Chaliapin.

=== Early career ===
Pia Ravenna started her singing studies in Helsinki in 1910 with Elin Fohström, with whom she studied for five years. She made her debut concert in 1913. In 1915, she went to St. Petersburg to continue her studies as a private student of Alma Fohström, a professor of singing at the St. Petersburg Conservatory after 10 years at the Bolshoy Theatre.

In 1917, Pia Ravenna made her stage debut in 1917 at the Finnish Opera. As Rosina in Il barbiere di siviglia she was highly celebrated. During the following years she appeared as Rigoletto, Lakme, and Faust. She was very successful; however, she wanted to develop her singing talent. She continued her studies in Stockholm. In Sweden she studied with Madame Charles Cahier, and in Milan her teacher was Frederico Corrado. During her study she also gave concerts both in Finland and the Nordic countries.

=== International engagements ===
Besides giving concerts in Nordic countries Pia Ravenna appeared in 1921 at the Monte Carlo Opera with Nellie Melba. The singers also appeared together in Puccini's La Bohème. After Monaco she joined an Italian opera company in Egypt, Cairo, Alexandria and Port Said in 1921–1923. At that time she sang the coloratura parts in Il barbiere di Siviglia, Rigoletto, La Traviata, La Sonnambula and Lucia di Lammermoor. After her years in Egypt she spent most of the 1920s touring in Italy and Central and Eastern Europe, giving concerts and performing as a guest singer in opera houses from Berlin to Bucharest.

=== From the 1924s through to the 1940s ===
In 1924, Pia Ravenna married singer Alessio Costa. The couple also appeared together; Costa accompanied her at the piano and sang duets with her. In 1929 the couple founded a private singing school, Studio Ravenna-Costa, where they both taught.

Pia Ravenna also taught at the Helsinki Music Institute. The longest engagement was at the Finnish National Opera from 1928 to 1940. At this Opera Pia Ravenna appeared in standard repertoire. Frequently she sang in Pagliacci, Carmen and Die Zauberflöte. She performed with many guest artists her favorite was Joseph Hislop. She appeared also in operettas in Madame Pompadour in 1928, and in the Spanish Nightingale in 1933 at the Swedish Theater in Finland. During the 1930s she made concert tours to Poland and Baltic countries. In 1948, she wrote a book called Gästspel i Egypten (Guest play in Egypt) that summed up her experience of the time in Egypt 1921–1923.

=== Later life ===
Pia Ravenna gave her farewell concert at the Helsinki Conservatory in October 1951. Reportedly multilingual, she used her language talent in translating Tex Willer when it arrived to Finland in 1953. After her retirement she gave singing lessons to students and travelled. Pia Ravenna died 1964 in Helsinki, six days before her 70th birthday.

== Recordings ==
Pia Ravenna first recorded for Vox (Berlin 1924), then for Odeon (Berlin 1928) and Parlophon (Berlin 1929). She was also famous for her broadcasts. She performed on live radio broadcasts about one hundred times. Her records were regularly played on the radio.

== Sources ==
- Rainer E. Lotz, Axel Weggen und Christian Zwarg: Discographie der deutschen Gesangsaufnahmen Band 3, Birgit Lotz Verlag, Bonn 2001; ISBN 3-9805808-6-5
