= Anna Kontek =

Anna Kontek is a Finnish Scenography and Costume Designer, permanently enrolled as scenographer at the Finnish National Opera since 1982. She has also appeared extensively as a guest designer at several theaters both in Finland and abroad as well. Kontek was born in Poland where she graduated as an architect.

== Career ==
She subsequently arrived in Finland in order to take up studies at the Helsinki University of Art and Design and obtained a Master’s degree in stage design in 1984.

== Career ==
Kontek’s first creation for the National Opera was the set and costume design for The Little Prince, a ballet premiered in1982. The reviews underlined the importance of Kontek’s talent for visualising and supporting the stage production in a creative way.

In all Kontek has created stage settings and costumes for more than 150 operas, ballets, contemporary dance performances, plays, operettas, visualised concerts and television shows over a period of forty years.

At the Finnish National Opera, Kontek has created the sets and costumes for 124 works, such as, the operas Katerina Ismailova (1982), La Bohème (1985), The Coronation of Poppea (1986), Tosca (1987), A Masked Ball (1989), Lucia di Lammermoor (1990), Ostrobothnians 1990, 1991, 2009), Nightingale (1992), Lohengrin (1994), La Bohème (1994, 2000), Insect Life (1996), Anna Bolena (1998), Khovanshtshina (2002), The Magic Flute (2006), the operetta The Merry Widow (2008), as well as, the ballets The Little Prince (1982), Swan Lake (1993), The Nutcracker (1994), La Bayadère (1997), Moomin and the Comet (2015), Moomin and the Magic Hat (2017).

Important works created for various regional theatres in Finland and opera houses abroad are, for instance, The Marriage of Figaro (1987), Tales of Hoffmann (1988), Don Giovanni (1989, 1999, 2002), La Traviata (1990, 1997), Madama Butterfly (1991), Carmen (1996, 2006, 2015), Tosca (1996), The Rake’s Progres (1998), Boris Godunov (2000, 2001), Don Carlos (2000), Jevgeni Onegin (2001, 2018), Rigoletto (2014) and The Caucasian Prisoner (2017), as well as, the operetta Die Fledermaus (2016).

Kontek has worked for many foreign ballet companies creating the design for ballets, such as, Swan Lake (2012), Cinderella (2014, 2015), A Midsummer Night’s Dream (2016), The Three Musketeers (2017, 2018), Dangerous Liaisons (2019).

Other significant works include the musicals The Sound of Music (2007) and Titanic (2008), as well as, theater performances of The Lady of the Camellias (1984), Barbarians (1991), Three Sisters (1993), Camille Claudel (1996), The Golden Calf (2000) and Haroun and the Sea of Stories (2001).

Kontek is attracted by architectonic solutions in set and costume design. For her, close cooperation with the director and the choreographer is of major importance. According to Kontek, scenography and costume design work is a continuous learning process, demanding thorough research. Among other things, the press and the critics have pointed out Kontek’s sense of colour dramaturgy and her ability to create magnificent scenes.

Kontek has participated in several international and national exhibitions and has curated a number of exhibitions at the National Opera. Costumes and sketches by Kontek are included in the collections of the Theatre Museum.

Throughout her career, Anna Kontek has won many international awards and marks of honours. Among others, in 1995, at the scenography world exhibition, the Praha Quadriennale Kontek she was awarded the Silver Medal for her sculptural costumes for Stravinsky’s opera The Nightingale, created at the National Opera in 1992. In 2017, at the Young Audiences Music Award competition, Kontek won the Best Opera in the World Award for her sets and costumes, designed for the Wonder Boy A opera, and the same year, she was awarded the Onegin Prize, in Russia, for the opera The Prisoner of the Caucasus. In 2018, the same work, The Prisoner of the Caucasus was awarded the Crystal Mask Prize at the Teatralnaya Vesna festival for best set and costume design.

== Awards and honours ==
Kontek has been awarded honorary decorations for her significant artistic achievements both in Finland and Poland. In 1999 Kontek was awarded the Knight’s Cross of the Order of Merit of the Republic of Poland and in 2017 the Officer’s Cross of the Order of Merit of the Republic of Poland.

The President of Finland Sauli Niinistö awarded the Knight of the Order of the Lion of Finland to Kontek in 2014.
