= Michael Güttler =

German conductor

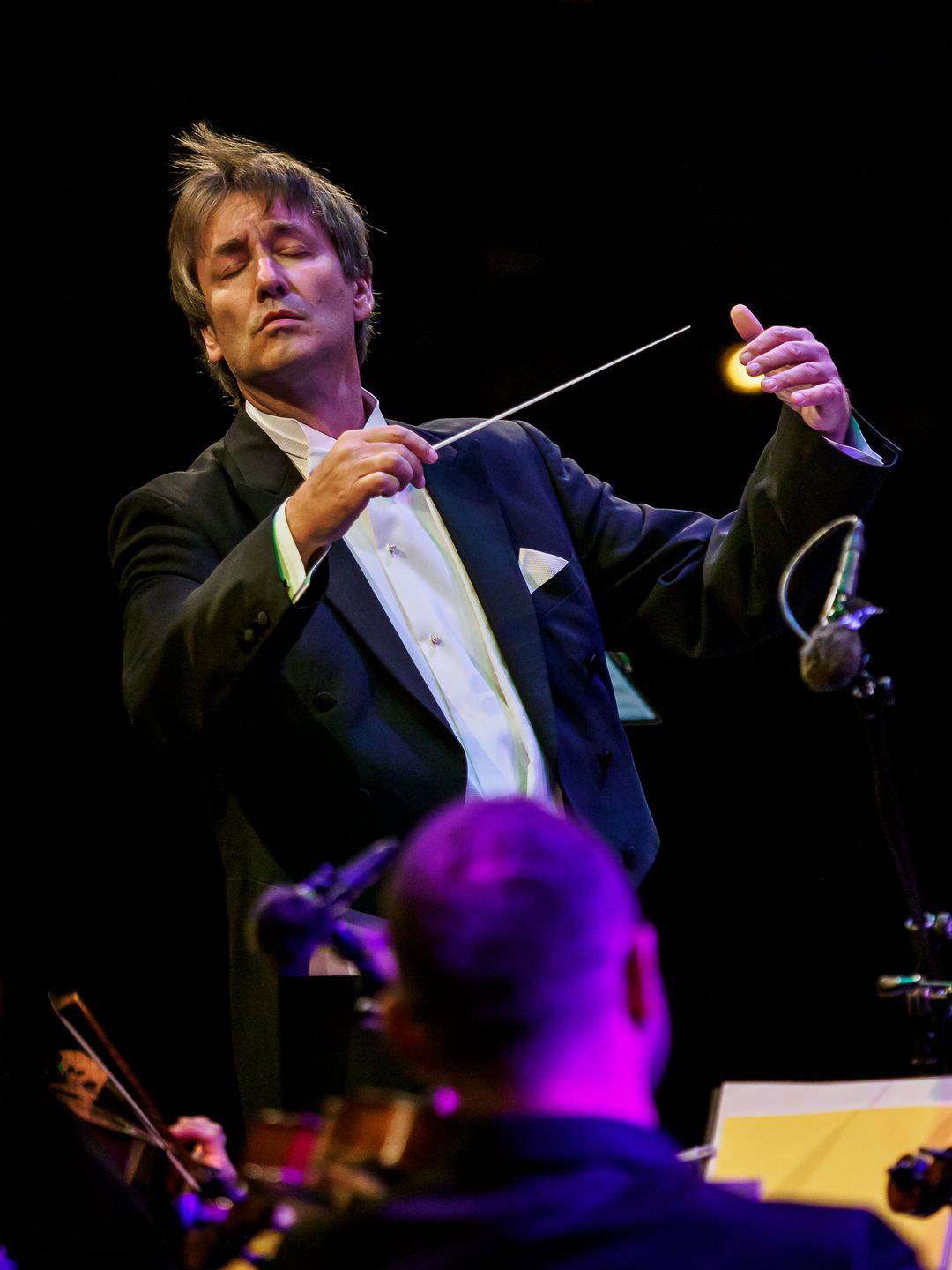
迈克尔·古特勒，2023年

Michael Güttler is a German conductor. He has served as principal conductor of the Finnish National Opera and general music director of the opera house in Yekaterinburg, and was a regular guest conductor at the Mariinsky Theatre in Saint Petersburg from 2003 to 2017. As a guest conductor, he has appeared at opera houses including the Vienna State Opera, Paris Opera, Teatro alla Scala, Teatro Real, Washington National Opera and the New National Theatre Tokyo.

== Early life and education ==
Güttler was born in Steinheidel in the Ore Mountains and grew up in Dresden. He attended the Dresdner Kreuzschule and studied orchestral conducting at the Hochschule für Musik Carl Maria von Weber Dresden. He was subsequently admitted to the Dirigentenforum, the young conductors' programme of the German Music Council.

He won first prizes at several conducting competitions, including the European Community's Franco Capuana Competition in Spoleto in 1996, the Bottega competition in Treviso in 1994, the International Conductors' Forum in Hamm in 1993 and Conduct for Dance in London in 1993.

== Career ==
=== Early career ===
From 1995, Güttler worked at the Teatro di San Carlo in Naples, where he spent four years and conducted more than 70 performances.

In 1998, he became chief conductor of the Stadttheater Klagenfurt in Austria. At the time of his appointment, he was the youngest chief conductor in Austria. During his tenure, the theatre's orchestra was enlarged.

=== Russia and international career ===
Güttler's association with the Mariinsky Theatre in Saint Petersburg began when he was engaged to prepare Wagner's Der Ring des Nibelungen. In January 2003, he substituted at short notice for an indisposed Valery Gergiev in Siegfried. He subsequently became a regular guest conductor at the Mariinsky Theatre, a relationship that continued until 2017. His repertoire there included complete Ring cycles and Wagner's Parsifal, Tristan und Isolde, Lohengrin and Der fliegende Holländer, as well as works by Wolfgang Amadeus Mozart, Giuseppe Verdi, Giacomo Puccini, Modest Mussorgsky, Pyotr Ilyich Tchaikovsky and Richard Strauss.

From 2005, Güttler was chief conductor at the opera house in Yekaterinburg. During his work there, he conducted productions including Mussorgsky's Boris Godunov, Bizet's Carmen and Wagner's The Flying Dutchman. The latter, performed in German, was the theatre's first new production of an opera by Wagner since the Second World War. Productions under his musical direction were nominated for the Golden Mask, Russia's national theatre award, and Güttler was himself nominated several times for the award for best conductor.

As a guest conductor, Güttler has appeared at the Vienna State Opera, Paris Opera, Washington National Opera, New National Theatre Tokyo, Teatro Real in Madrid, La Fenice in Venice and the Teatro di San Carlo in Naples. In May 2007, he substituted at short notice for Gergiev in Wagner's Lohengrin at the Opéra Bastille in Paris, in a cast including Waltraud Meier and Ben Heppner.

His other operatic engagements have included the Deutsche Oper am Rhein in Düsseldorf, the Hamburg State Opera, the Théâtre des Champs-Élysées in Paris and the Teatro Nacional de São Carlos in Lisbon. As a concert conductor, he has appeared with orchestras including the Israel Philharmonic Orchestra, Orchestre de Paris, Moscow Philharmonic Orchestra, National Philharmonic Orchestra of Russia and Swedish Radio Symphony Orchestra.

Güttler made his debut at the Vienna State Opera in 2010 with Verdi's Rigoletto and has returned regularly since then. His repertoire at the house has included Rossini's Il barbiere di Siviglia and La Cenerentola, Strauss's Ariadne auf Naxos, Massenet's Werther, Wagner's Lohengrin, Tchaikovsky's Eugene Onegin and The Queen of Spades, and Mussorgsky's Boris Godunov and Khovanshchina.

=== Finnish National Opera and later career ===
In 2013, Güttler was appointed principal conductor of the Finnish National Opera in Helsinki, succeeding Mikko Franck. His tenure began on 1 August 2013. He held the position until 2016. His repertoire with the company included Boris Godunov, Debussy's Pelléas et Mélisande, Wagner's Die Meistersinger von Nürnberg, Verdi's Aida and Don Carlos, Mozart's The Magic Flute, Puccini's La bohème, Richard Strauss's Der Rosenkavalier and Shostakovich's The Nose, as well as orchestral and choral concerts.

In the summer of 2015, Güttler conducted a new production of Puccini's Tosca at the Opernfestspiele St. Margarethen.

In 2016, he conducted Wagner's Die Meistersinger von Nürnberg at the Glyndebourne Festival, having taken over the production at relatively short notice.

In 2019, Güttler made his debut at the Tyrolean Festival Erl, conducting Wagner's Parsifal and Rossini's Guillaume Tell. In December of the same year, he conducted the Vienna State Opera's first guest performance in Switzerland, a performance of Mozart's Don Giovanni at Victoria Hall in Geneva.

During the 2022–23 season, Güttler conducted Tristan und Isolde, Tchaikovsky's The Queen of Spades and Verdi's Nabucco, as well as concert programmes, at the Hessisches Staatstheater Wiesbaden.

In January 2023, Güttler made his debut at La Scala in Milan conducting Richard Strauss's Salome.

In June 2025, he returned at short notice to the Vienna State Opera to conduct Tchaikovsky's The Queen of Spades. In the same month, he conducted a series of performances of Wagner's Tannhäuser at Müpa Budapest.

In October 2026, Güttler is scheduled to make his Australian debut conducting Opera Australia's Wagner Gala Concert, marking the reopening of the Ian Potter State Theatre at Arts Centre Melbourne.

== Personal life ==
Güttler is the son of German trumpeter Ludwig Güttler. He is married and has three children.
