= Lorenz Nikolai Achté =

Finnish opera singer (1835–1900)

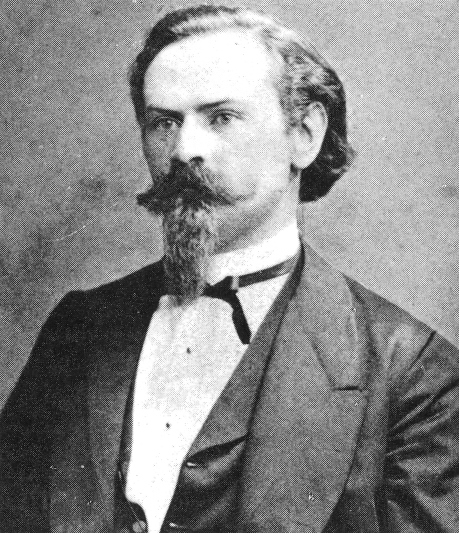
Lorenz Nikolai Achté.

Lorenz Nikolai Achté (25 May 1835 – April 18, 1900) was a Finnish opera singer, composer, conductor and music teacher. He was born in Pori, and was one of the Finnish Opera's first artists, together with his wife Emmy Achté. He established a cantor-organist school, Helsinki Church Music School, in Helsinki in 1882.

Achté died in Helsinki. His daughter Aino Ackté became a famous opera singer.
