= Tuuli Takala =

Finnish opera singer

- Born: Helsinki, Finland
- Education: Sibelius Academy
- Occupation: Opera singer (soprano)
- Website: tuulitakala.com

Tuuli Takala (born 1987, Helsinki) is a Finnish classical singer and operatic soprano.

== Early life ==
Takala was born into a musical family in Helsinki, Finland in 1987. She began her musical education at age five with the violin, which remained her main instrument for almost 15 years. Since the age of six she has also sung in various choirs, including the renowned Tapiola Choir and the EMO Ensemble.

Takala studied at the Sibelius Academy in Helsinki, Finland. She was initially in the Programme of Music Education, studying voice under the guidance of soprano Aulikki Eerola. Then, she broadened her singing education with soprano Ritva-Liisa Korhonen at the Helsinki Metropolia University of Applied Sciences and at the Sibelius Academy Opera Programme, from which she holds a Master of Music degree.

== Career ==
Tuuli Takala became known to the broad audience after she won two renowned national singing competitions in the summer of 2013: the Timo Mustakallio Competition and the Kangasniemi Singing Competition, followed by her triumphant professional debut at the Finnish National Opera in the role of the Queen of the Night in Mozart’s Magic Flute. Tuuli's international stage debut followed two years later in 2015 when she joined the Semperoper Dresden in their new production of W.A. Mozart's opera The Marriage of Figaro. In the same year she was also a finalist and recipient of 2 Engagement Prizes at the 34th International Hans Gabor Belvedere Singing Competition in Amsterdam.

Thereafter Takala has performed at many of Europe's leading opera houses, including the Royal Opera House London (Covent Garden), Zürich Opera, Staatsoper Berlin, the Bolshoi Theatre of Moscow, Deutsche Oper Berlin, Hamburg State Opera and Volksoper Wien, and also many of the leading opera festivals, including Salzburg Festival, Bayreuth Festival and Savonlinna Opera Festival. Since season 2015/16 Tuuli Takala is also a permanent member of the ensemble at Semperoper Dresden, Germany.

Takala's most notable roles include the Queen of the Night (The Magic Flute), Lucia di Lammermoor, Gilda (Rigoletto), Violetta Valéry (La Traviata), Sophie (Der Rosenkavalier), Marguerite (Gounod's Faust), Susanna (The Marriage of Figaro), Marzelline (Fidelio), La Contessa di Folleville (Il viaggio a Reims) and Mimì (La Bohème). Alongside her opera engagements, Takala has performed extensively in concert both in Finland and internationally. Among her notable public appearances was the nationally televised memorial service of President Mauno Koivisto in 2017.

== Prizes and awards ==
- 2013 – Arnold Schönberg Center special prize and finalist in the 8th International Hilde Zadek Singing Competition, Vienna, Austria
- 2013 – Winner of the Timo Mustakallio Competition
- 2013 – 1st prize in the Kangasniemi Singing Competition
- 2013 – Sibelius Birth Place Medal (Sibelius Society of Hämeenlinna, Finland)
- 2014 – Young Artist of the Year 2014 (Pro Musica Foundation, Finland)
- 2015 – 2 special prizes and finalist at the 34th International Hans Gabor Belvedere Singing Competition, Amsterdam, Holland
- 2018 – Named "Female Singer of the Year" (1st AINO Opera Gala, Finland)
- 2018 – Recipient of the Curt Taucher Award (Semperoper Foundation, Dresden, Germany)
