= Suomalainen Ooppera =

Ida Basilier

Suomalainen Ooppera ('The Finnish Opera'), was an opera active in Helsinki i Finland between 1873 and 1879. It was a pioneer institution as the first Finnish language opera and as such plays an important role in Finnish cultural history.

== History ==
At the time of its foundation, both opera and dramatic theatre had until then been performed in the Swedish language in Finland, since that was the traditional language of the aristocracy. The Finnish Opera was the lyric equivalent of the Finnish National Theatre, another pioneer institution which had been founded a year prior, and the two pioneering institutions used the same building, but they were managed as two separate institutions.

The Finnish language theatre was to become permanent. However, although the Opera did achieve artistic success, it was not economically successful, and it was dissolved in 1879. No new opera was to be established in Finland until the foundation of the Finnish National Opera and Ballet in 1910.

== Members ==
The artists engaged at the Suomalainen Ooppera include:

- Emmy Achté
- Ida Basilier-Magelssen
- Alma Fohström
- Alma Lund
