= Ida Basilier-Magelssen =

Finnish soprano (1846–1928)

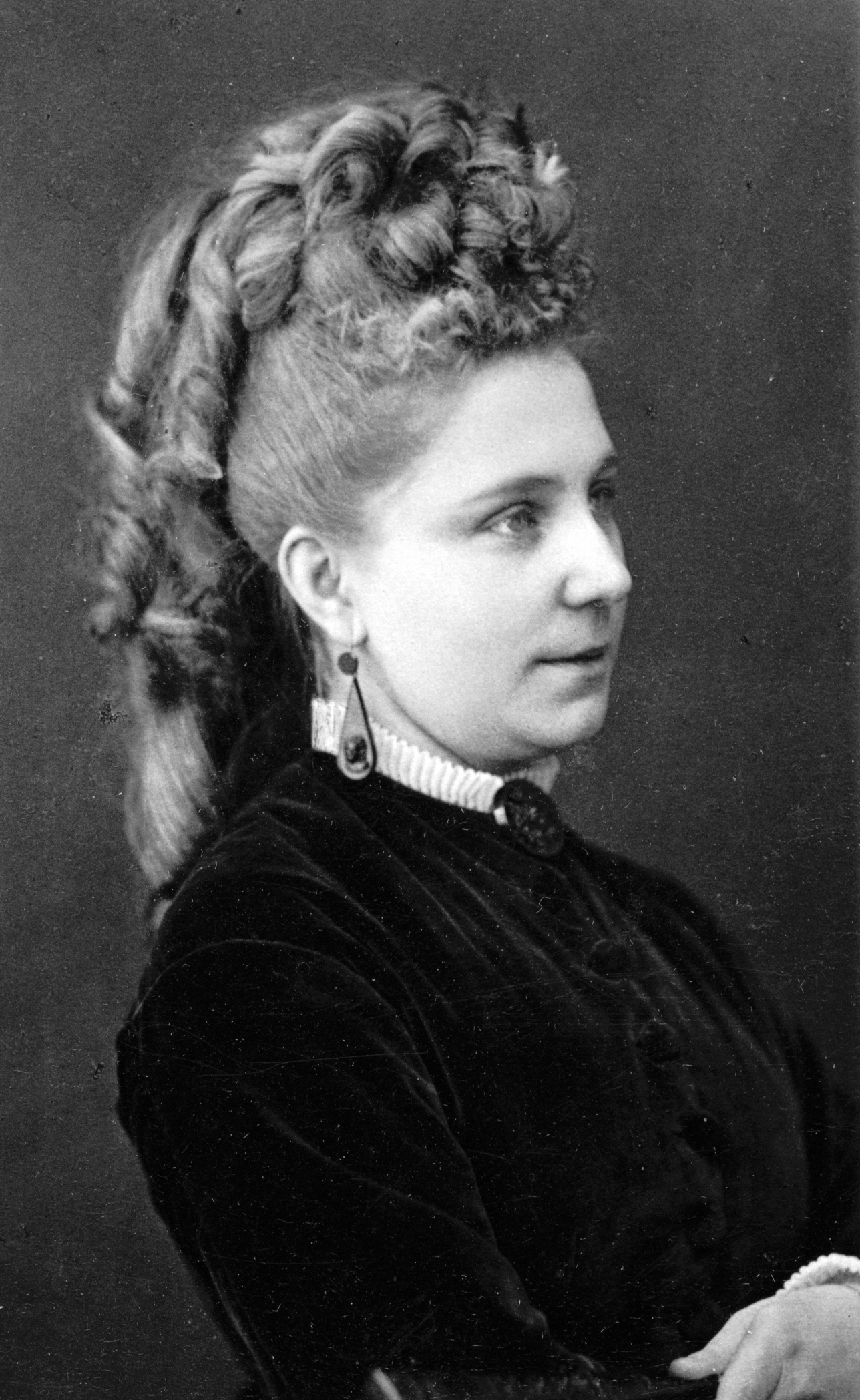

Background information
- Born: 10 September 1846
- Died: 23 May 1928 (aged 81)
- Genre: opera
- Instrument: soprano

Ida Basilier-Magelssen (1846–1928) was a Finnish soprano, who sang in both concerts and opera performances. After a period with the Royal Swedish Opera in Stockholm, she returned to Helsinki where she was particularly active in 1876–77, singing in 12 different operas for a total of 110 performances at the Finnish Opera. She also toured in Germany, France, Russia and Great Britain.

== Biography ==
Born on 10 September 1846 in Oulu, Ida Basilier was the daughter of the landowner Carl Frederik Basilier and Gustava Mathilda Garvoli, a pianist. She was brought up in a musical family in which each of her seven siblings played a musical instrument while she concentrated on singing.

After training under Emilie Mechelin in Helsinki, when she was 20 she went to Paris where she studied for three years on a state grant. She sang for Napoléon III and the Empress Eugénie before continuing her studies in St Petersburg and Germany. She made her début at a concert in Helsinki in 1868. In November 1970, she played Leonora in Il trovatore in the first full-length opera to be performed in Finnish.

In the 1870s, she performed in operas in Finland where together with Emmy Achté she was one of the principal attractions, but she also gained prominence in Sweden (1876) and Great Britain (1877). Key roles included Zerlina in Don Giovanni, Rosina in The Barber of Seville, Norina in Don Pasquale, Violetta in La Traviata and Maragrata in Faust. She performed in some 700 operas and concerts in the Scandinavian countries over a ten-year period, in addition to appearances in Paris, Munich and England.

In 1878, Basilier married Johan Magelssen, a Norwegian who was editor of Aftenposten, and moved to Norway where she performed in a number of operas in Kristiania (Oslo) and worked as a voice teacher at the Conservatory.

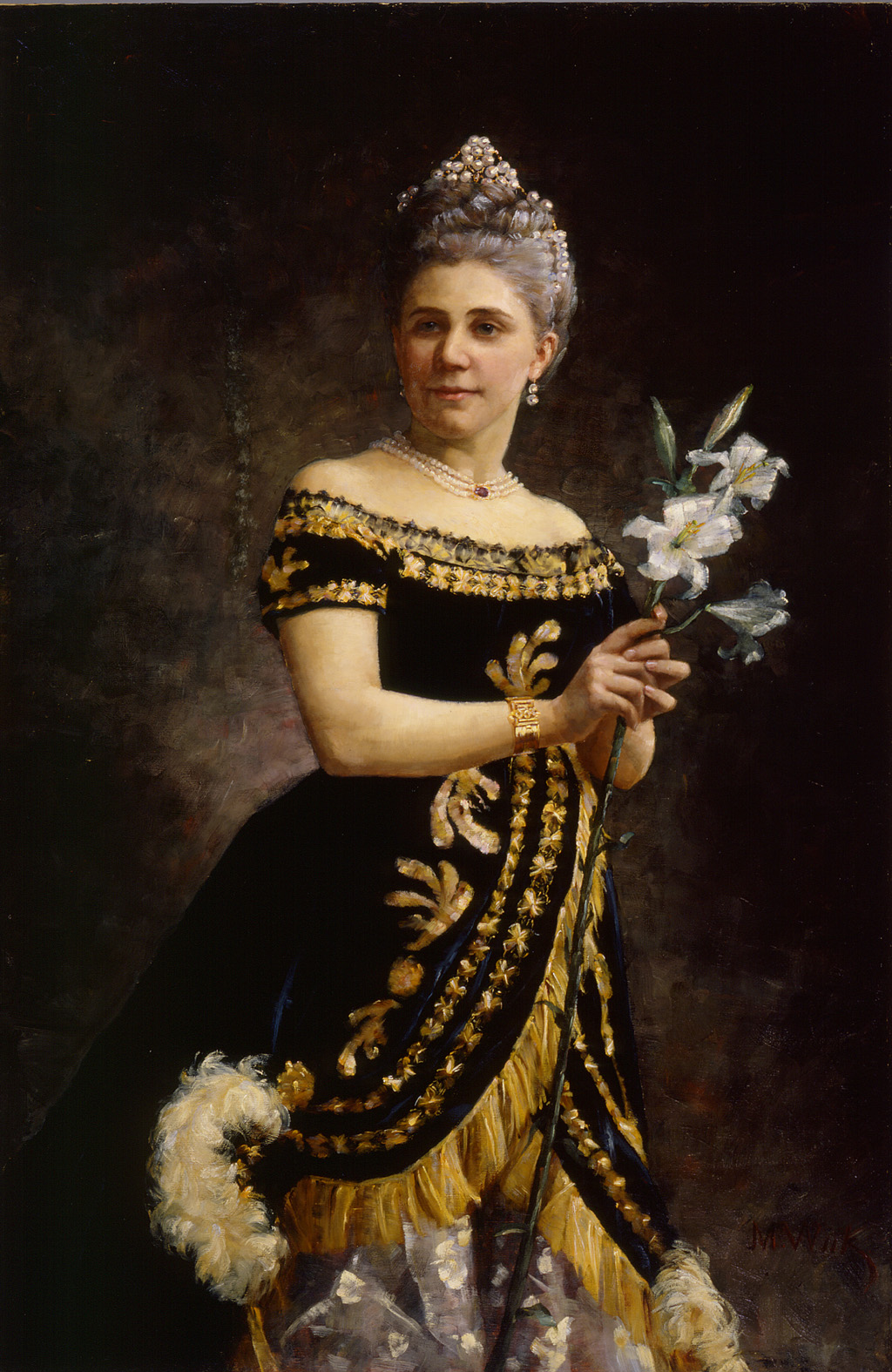
Basilier-Magelssen's portrait by Maria Wiik as Philine in Ambroise Thomas' opera Mignon, 1887

Ida Basilier-Magelssen died in Hegra, Norway, on 23 May 1928.
