= Constantin Ahnger =

Finnish engineer and scientist (1855–1942)

Hovineuvos Constantin Ahnger
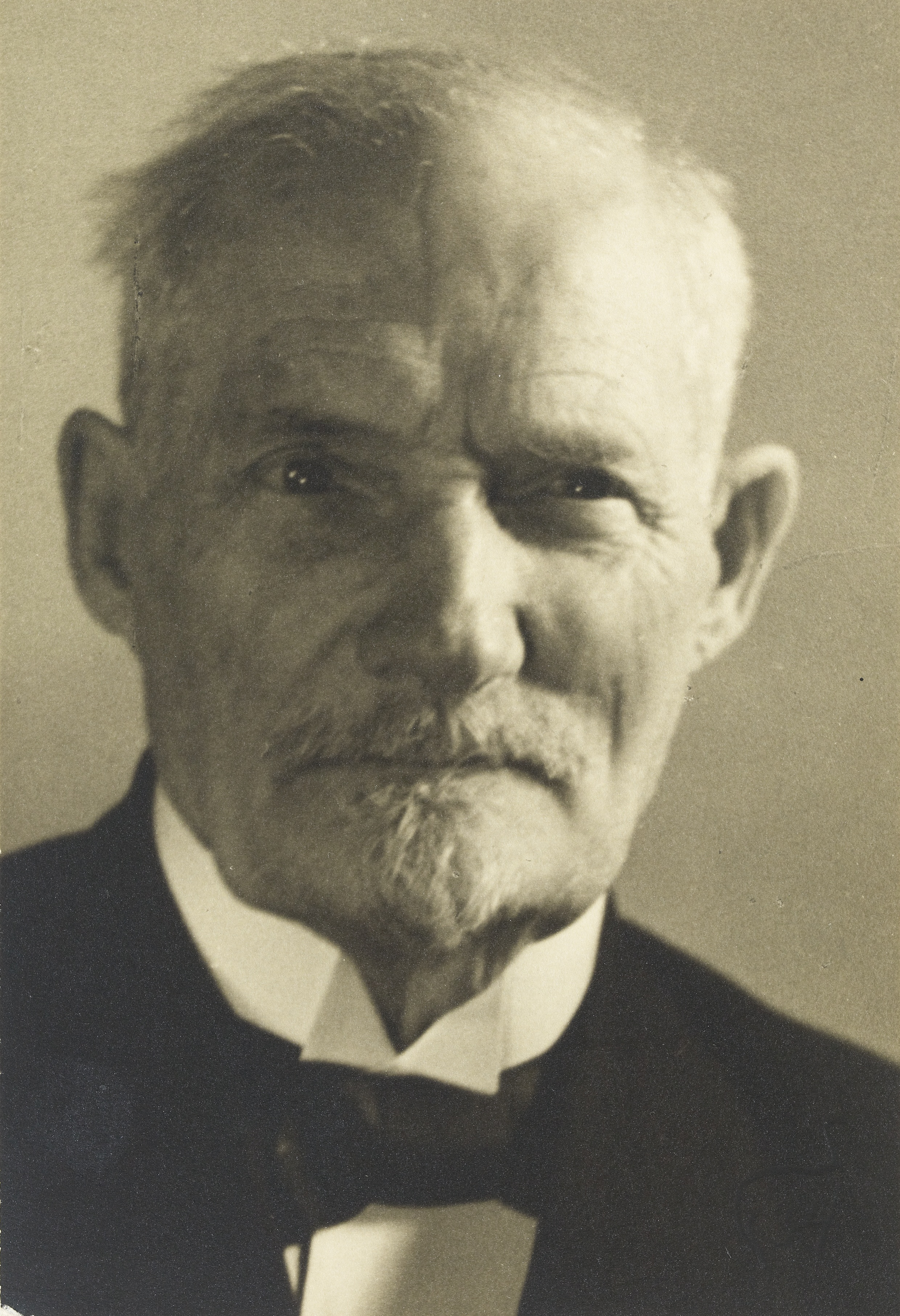
- Ahnger in 1934
- Born: 10 November 1855; Kuopio, Grand Duchy of Finland, Russian Empire
- Died: 27 June 1942 (aged 86); Helsinki, Finland
- Family: Alexandra Ahnger (sister)

Constantin Ahnger (also known as Konstantin Ahnger; 10 November 1855 — 27 June 1942) was a Finnish engineer and entomologist.

== Career ==
=== Engineering ===
Ahnger worked for the Russian railway and telegraph services from the 1880s until the early 1930, stationed in different locations around the country including Irkutsk, Omsk, Ashgabat, Kokand and Taganrog.

For his services, Ahnger was granted the Imperial Russian honorary title of Hovineuvos (Russian: надворный советник; see Court Councillor).

=== Scientific ===
On his extensive travels and postings around Russia, Ahnger collected over 60,000 insect and other specimens. They are contained in the collections of the University of Helsinki, Saint Petersburg State University, Howard University, and others.

He also established several museums in the cities he was posted to, and received a silver medal from the Russian Geographical Society for his scientific efforts.

Over thirty species are named after him, including Anacanthotermes ahngerianus.

== Personal life ==
Constantin Ahnger was born in Kuopio to Colonel Oscar Ahnger, who later became the Chief of Police of Viipuri, and Alexandrine née von Koberwein.

His sister was the opera singer and teacher of voice Alexandra Ahnger.
