= Edmond Duvernoy =

French opera singer

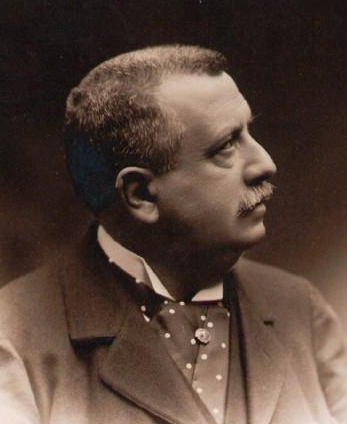
Edmond Duvernoy

Charles-Henri Edmond Duvernoy (16 June 1844 – 12 January 1927) was a French pianist, baritone and vocal teacher, from a family of musicians.

== Life and career ==
Edmond Duvernoy was born in Paris. He was taught initially by his father, Charles-François Duvernoy, then studied at the Paris Conservatoire. A fine pianist, he began to teach, then studied singing, joining the Opéra-Comique company. He made his stage debut as Mercutio in the first performance at the Opéra-Comique of Gounod's Roméo et Juliette on 20 January 1873. He also sang Moralès in the premiere of Bizet's Carmen in 1875; Bizet composed three versions of the mélodrame in Act 1 for Duvernoy.

According to Malherbe, he had a relatively soft voice, but he used it with good taste, and with sufficient talent to enable him to become later one of the most esteemed vocal teachers.

He sang Ganymède in Galathée in 1873, alongside his future wife, Mlle Franck, a soprano of the Opéra-Comique. Duvernoy and his wife moved to the Théâtre-Lyrique in 1877. Both of them participated in the private 'premiere' of Offenbach's Les contes d'Hoffmann on 18 May 1879, Duvernoy playing the piano.

From October 1887 to 1910 Duvernoy was a singing professor at the Conservatoire de Paris, with many important artists among his pupils including the Finnish sopranos Aino Ackté and Hanna Granfelt. He also composed some songs.

He died in Paris in 1927, aged 82. His brother was Alphonse Duvernoy, pianist and composer.

== Sources ==
- Pierre Key's international music year book. Pierre Key, New York 1928.
- Brigitte Labat-Poussin, Jean Favier: Archives du theatre national de l'opera. Inventaire. Archives Nationales, Paris 1977.
