= Emmy Achté =

Finnish opera singer (1850–1924)

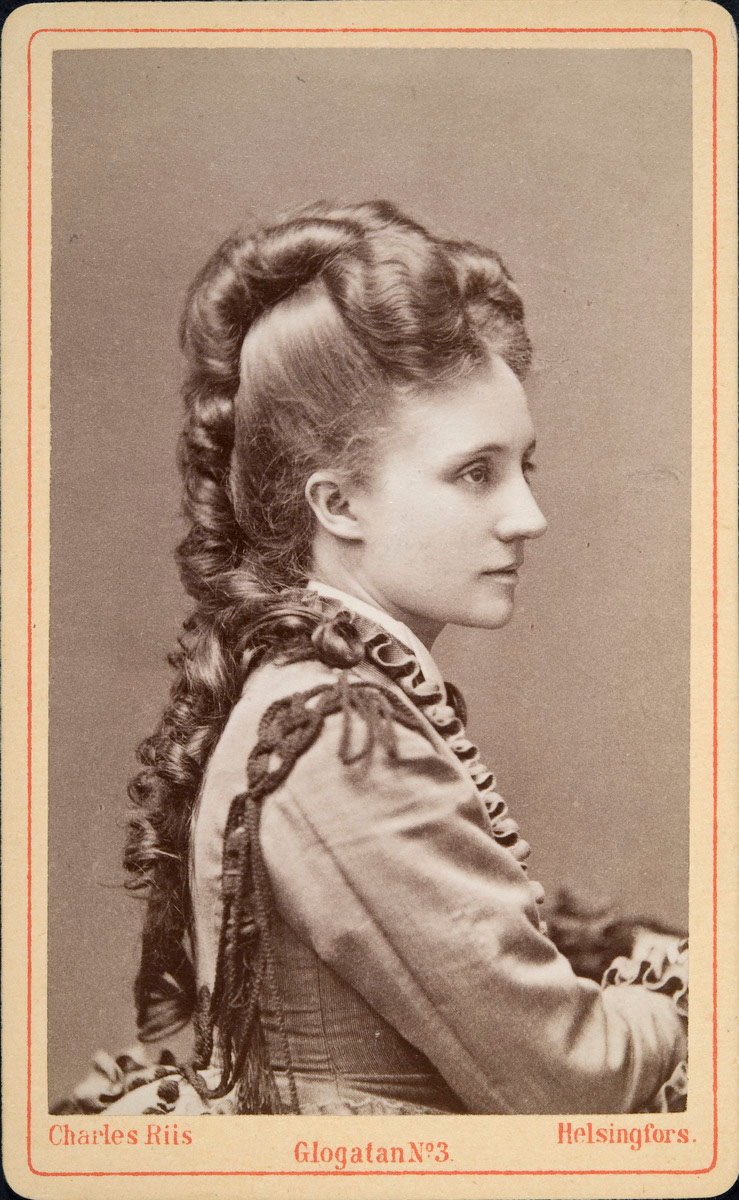

Background information
- Born: 14 November 1850; Oulu
- Died: 2 December 1924 (aged 74) Helsinki
- Genre: opera
- Instrument: mezzo-soprano

Emmy Charlotta Achté née Strömer (14 November 1850 – 2 December 1924) was an operatic mezzo-soprano, the first prima donna of the Finnish Opera. She performed in Helsinki from 1873 to 1879, excelling in dramatic roles. She was also a voice teacher for over 40 years, starting an opera class at the Helsinki Institute of Music.

== Biography ==
Born in Oulu on 14 November 1850, Emmy Strömer studied singing in Helsinki under Emilie Mechelin. From 1869 to 1873, she received further training in Stockholm under Fredrika Stenhammar and in Paris under Jean-Jacques Masset. In 1875, she married Lorenz Nikolai Achté, the conductor of the Finnish Opera. When Kaarlo Bergbom opened the Finnish Opera in 1873, Achté played all the main mezzo-soprano roles until 1879. These included Azucena in Il trovatore, Valentine in Les Huguenots and Pamina in The Magic Flute. She also gave concerts in Finland, Sweden, Norway and Germany and in 1878 sang at the opera in Gothenburg as a guest star. She is also remembered for her work as a voice teacher over a period of 40 years from 1874. In the early 1880s, she studied further in Dresden under Eugen Hildach. In 1892, Achté performed in Sibelius' choral symphony Kullervo and in 1896, she played Chatelaine in his Jungfrun i tornet.

Achté served as a teacher at her husband's Cantor-Organist school. After his death in 1900, she headed the establishment until 1922. From 1910 to 1913, she ran a private opera school and in 1912 she initiated an opera class at the Helsinki Institute of Music. From 1910, she also taught drama and song at Helsinki's Swedish Theatre, directing a number of operas from 1912.

Emmy Achté was the mother of the internationally famous opera singers Aino Ackté and Irma Tervani. She died in Helsinki on 2 December 1924.
