= Alexandra Ahnger =

Finnish singer and voice teacher (1859–1940)

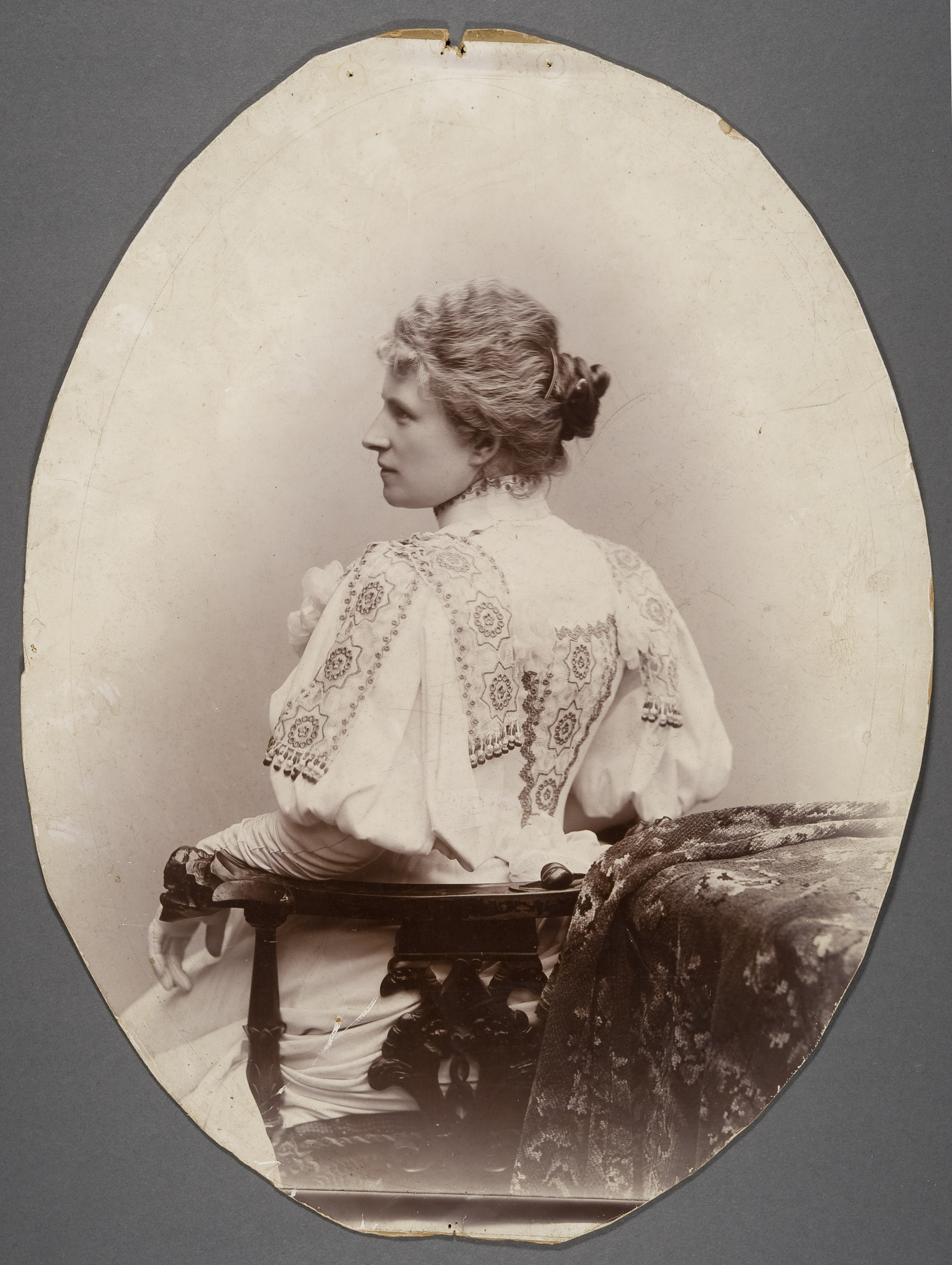
- Alexandra Ahnger in the early 1890s
- Born: 15 May 1859; Kuopio, Grand Duchy of Finland
- Died: 9 September 1940 (aged 81); Helsinki, Finland
- Education: Helsinki Institute of Music

Alexandra Ahnger (15 May 1859 — 9 September 1940) was a Finnish opera singer (mezzo-soprano) and pedagogue, notable as a leading teacher of voice in her time in Finland.

== Early life and education ==
Alexandra Ahnger was born in Kuopio to Colonel Oscar Ahnger, who later became the Chief of Police of Viipuri, and Alexandrine née von Koberwein. Her older brother, Constantin Ahnger, became a notable entomologist.

She received her education at the Smolny Institute for Noble Maidens in St Petersburg, after which she studied singing in the Helsinki Institute of Music (later Helsinki Conservatory, now part of Sibelius Academy) from 1882 to 1885.

She followed this with further studies in Europe, first in Dresden (1885–1888) under Eugen and Anna Hildach, who subsequently also visited Finland to give a joint concert together with Ahnger, and later in Paris where she on occasions between 1890 and 1906 received instruction from Désirée Artôt and Eugénie Vergin (aka. Élise Colonne), among others. She also made a study trip to Milan in 1924.

== Career ==
=== Singer ===
Ahnger's operatic repertoire especially comprised Finnish contemporary opera, including the roles of Louhi in Merikanto's Maiden of the North, Taina in Melartin's Aino, and Katri in Daniel Hjort by Selim Palmgren.

She also sang the role of Magdalena, in the Opera of Finland (now the Finnish National Opera) production of Kienzl's Der Evangelimann, staged at the Finnish National Theatre in March 1914 and conducted by Oskar Merikanto, to mark the 40th anniversary of the first fully-staged opera performance in Finland.

Ahnger performed as soloist in many oratorios and choral works, especially ones conducted by Robert Kajanus; these included most notably Beethoven's 9th Symphony and Missa solemnis, Schumann's Paradise and the Peri, and Liszt's Christus.

She also sang in concerts by Armas Järnefelt and others, and notably premiered Sibelius's Lied Demanten på marssnö in February 1901, accompanied on the piano by Oskar Merikanto.

Ahnger is only known to have recorded once, a collection of Lieds by Sibelius, Merikanto and others; this took place in November 1904, making it one of the first recordings in Finland.

=== Teacher ===
Alongside her singing career, Ahnger also began teaching singing privately as early as 1888, as well as holding positions as music teacher in various Helsinki schools.

She was later appointed teacher of voice at the Helsinki Institute of Music, where she served for over twenty years, from 1906 to 1927. Due to that role especially, she is considered one of the leading Finnish singing pedagogues of the early 20th century.
