= Aino Ackté =

Finnish soprano (1876–1944)

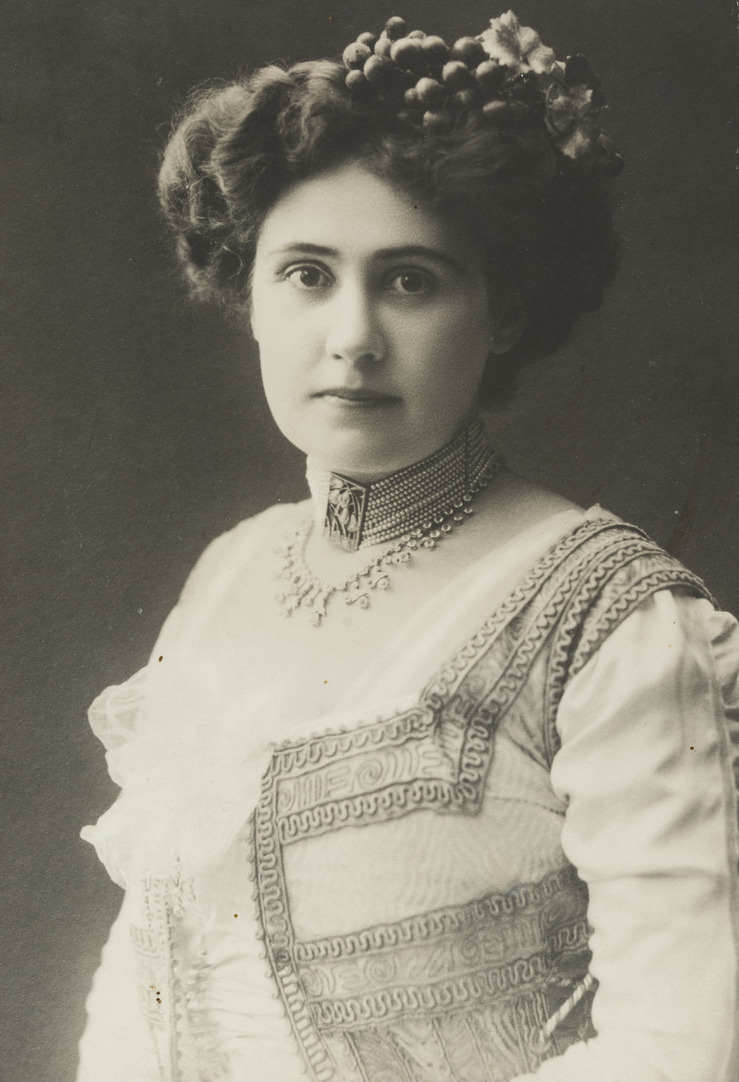
- Aino Ackté (c. 1900)
- Born: Aino Achte; 23 April 1876; Helsinki, Grand Duchy of Finland, Russian Empire (now Finland)
- Died: 8 August 1944 (aged 68); Nummela, Finland
- Occupation: Opera singer

Air des Bijoux (2:17)
Aria from the opera Faust.

Aino Ackté (originally Achte; 24 April 1876 – 8 August 1944) was a Finnish dramatic soprano. She was the first international star of the Finnish opera scene after Alma Fohström, and a groundbreaker for the domestic field.

== Biography ==
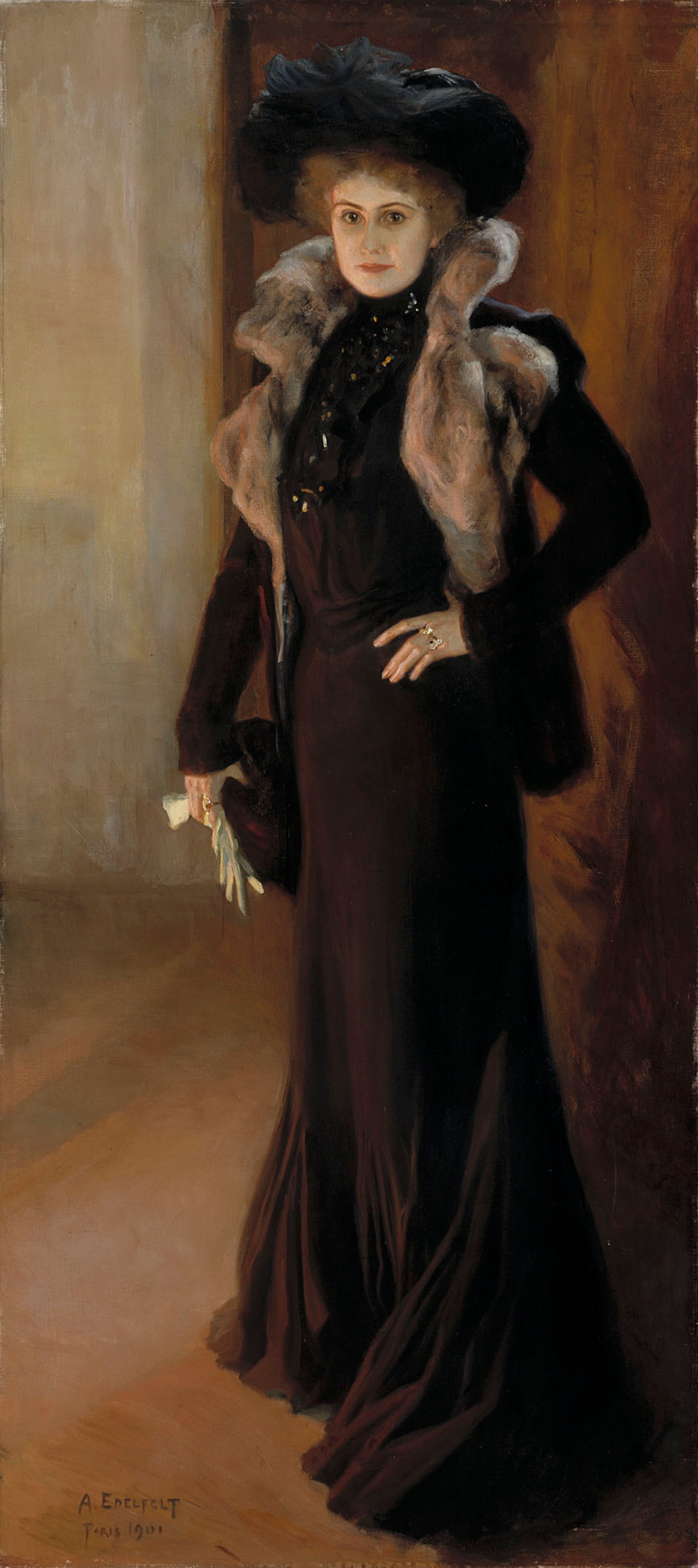
Albert Edelfelt's portrait of Ackté from 1901

Ackté was born in Helsinki. Her parents were mezzo-soprano Emmy Achté (née Strömer) and the conductor-composer Lorenz Nikolai Achté.

The young Ackté studied singing under her mother's tutelage until 1894 when she entered the Paris Conservatory, studying under Edmond Duvernoy and Alfred Girodet. Her debut at the Paris Opera was in 1897 in Faust and she was signed on for six years as a result. Ackté's coterie included among others Albert Edelfelt, who painted two famous full portraits of her in 1901 and 1902.

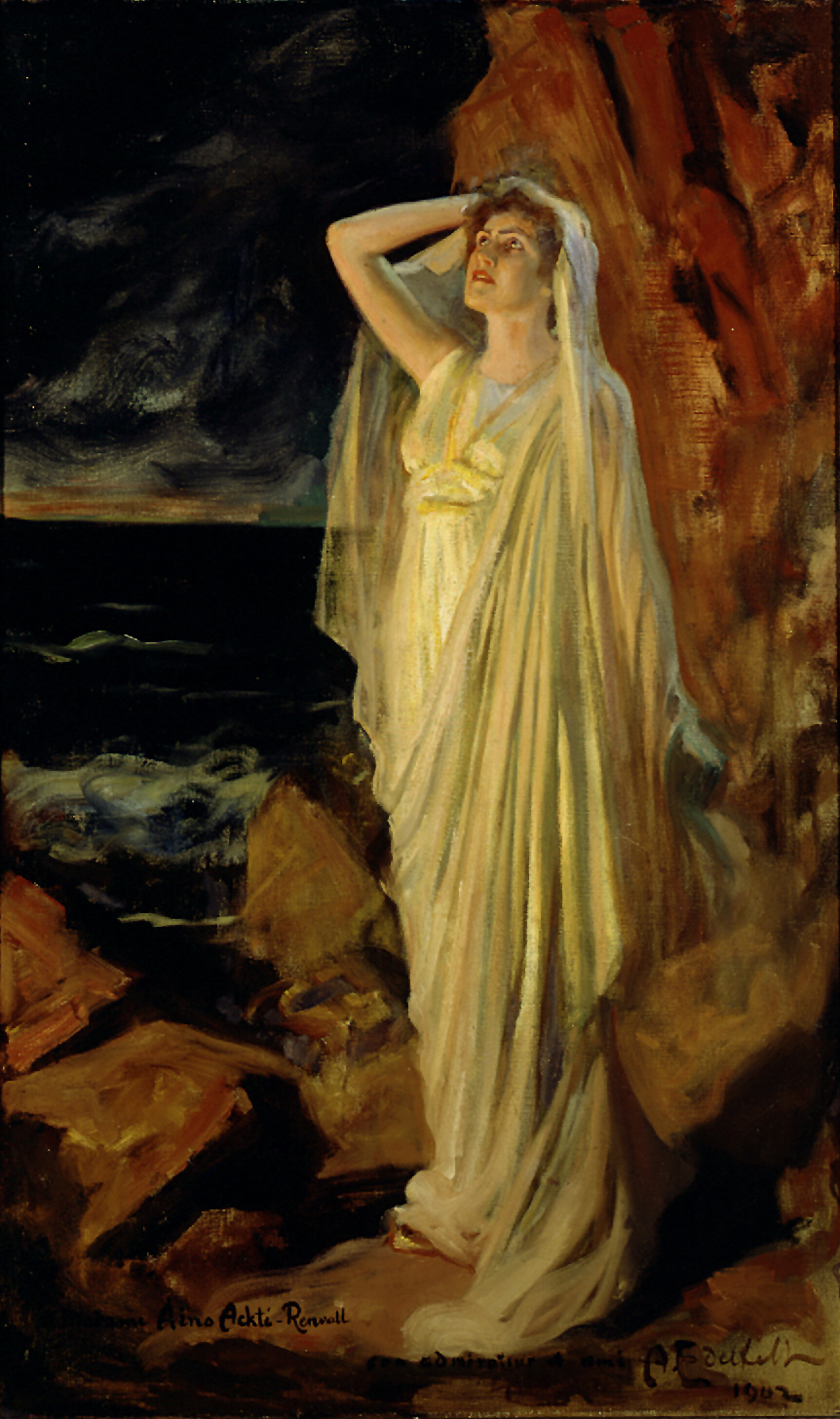
Another portrait by Edelfelt, 1902

Aino Ackté married a lawyer, Heikki Renvall, in 1901 and gave birth to a daughter, Glory, the same year. She officially adopted the surname Ackté-Renvall. Their son, Mies Reenkola, was born in 1908.

In 1904 Ackté was engaged by the New York Metropolitan Opera where she remained until 1906. She performed the title role of Richard Strauss's Salome at its local premieres in Leipzig (1907) and London (1910). The Covent Garden premiere was an enormous success and Strauss himself proclaimed Ackté the "one and only Salome". Ackté considered the London performances her real breakthrough.

In 1911, Ackté, Oskar Merikanto, and Edvard Fazer founded the Kotimainen Ooppera (renamed in 1914 Finnish Opera, and then in 1956 the Finnish National Opera). She was to act as its director in 1938–1939.

After parting ways with the National Opera, Ackté organized an international Savonlinna Opera Festival beginning on 3 July 1912; it was held 1912–1914, 1916 and 1930.

Jean Sibelius dedicated his tone poem Luonnotar to Ackté and she premiered the work on 10 September 1913 at the Three Choirs Festival in Gloucester, England. She also sang in the first performance of Luonnotar in Finland, in January 1914.

Ackté ended her international travels in 1914 and returned to Finland, where she gave her farewell performance in 1920. She married Bruno Jalander, the governor of Uusimaa, in 1919, changing her name to Ackté-Jalander.

Her final public performances took place at the Savonlinna Opera Festival in 1930. She provided the libretto for Juha, an opera that received two treatments: the first by Aarre Merikanto (1922) and the second by Leevi Madetoja (1934). She died of pancreatic cancer in Nummela, Vihti in August 1944.

== Legacy ==
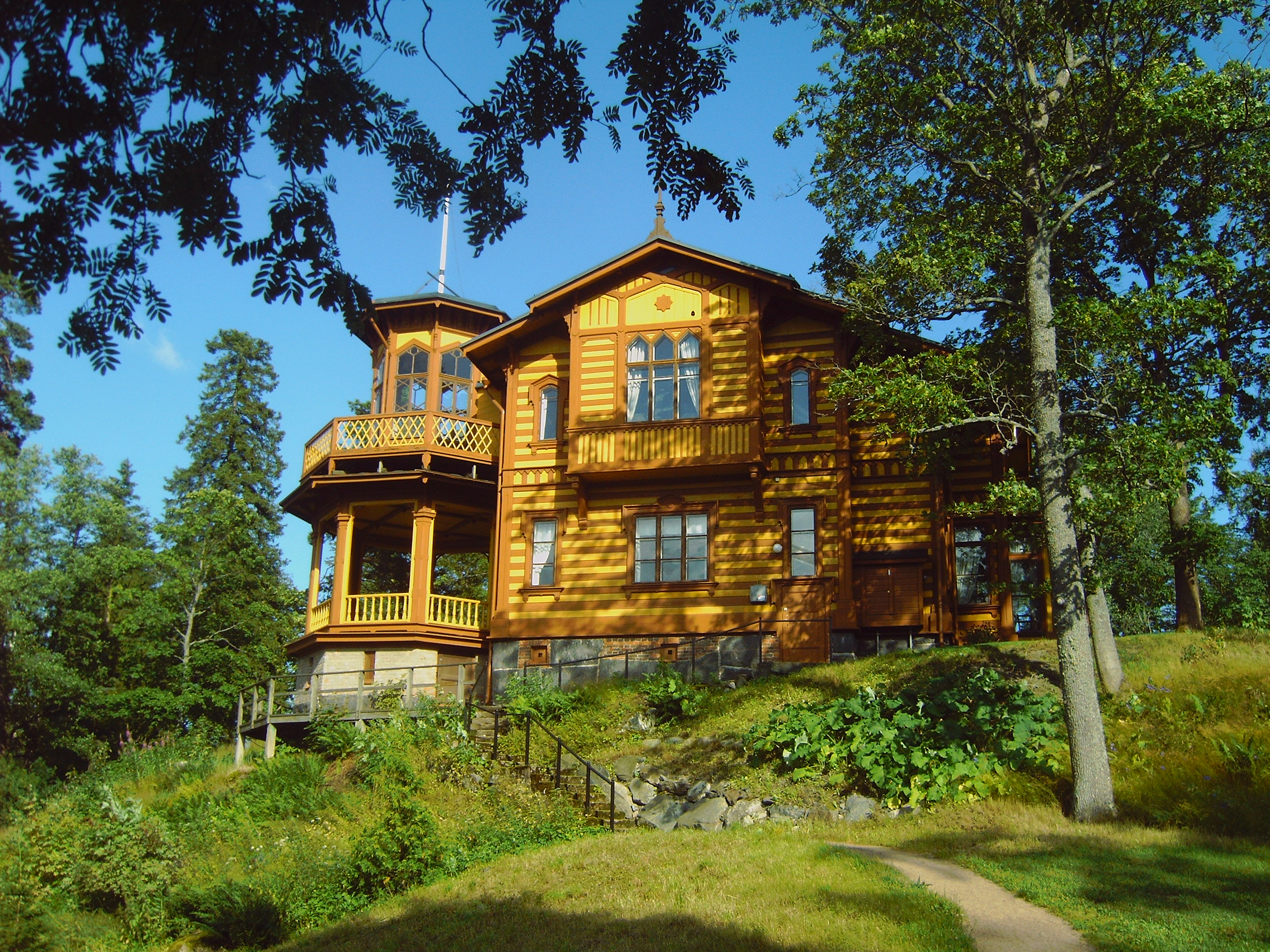
Villa Aino Ackté in Helsinki

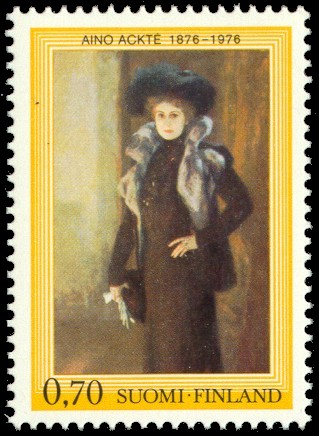
1976 Finnish postage stamp with Edelfelt's painting of her

She has a park road named after her, near the Olavinlinna in Savonlinna, and another street in Helsinki, Finland. Her old summerhouse, Villa Aino Ackté, located in Helsinki is being rented by the city for cultural activities and meetings.

Ackté is theorized to have most likely been the original model for the opera diva character Bianca Castafiore in comics books of "Adventures of Tintin" by Belgian Hergé.

== Gallery ==
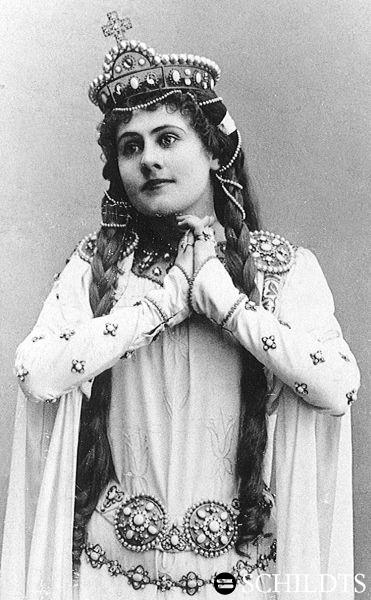
In Wagner's Tannhäuser, 1899

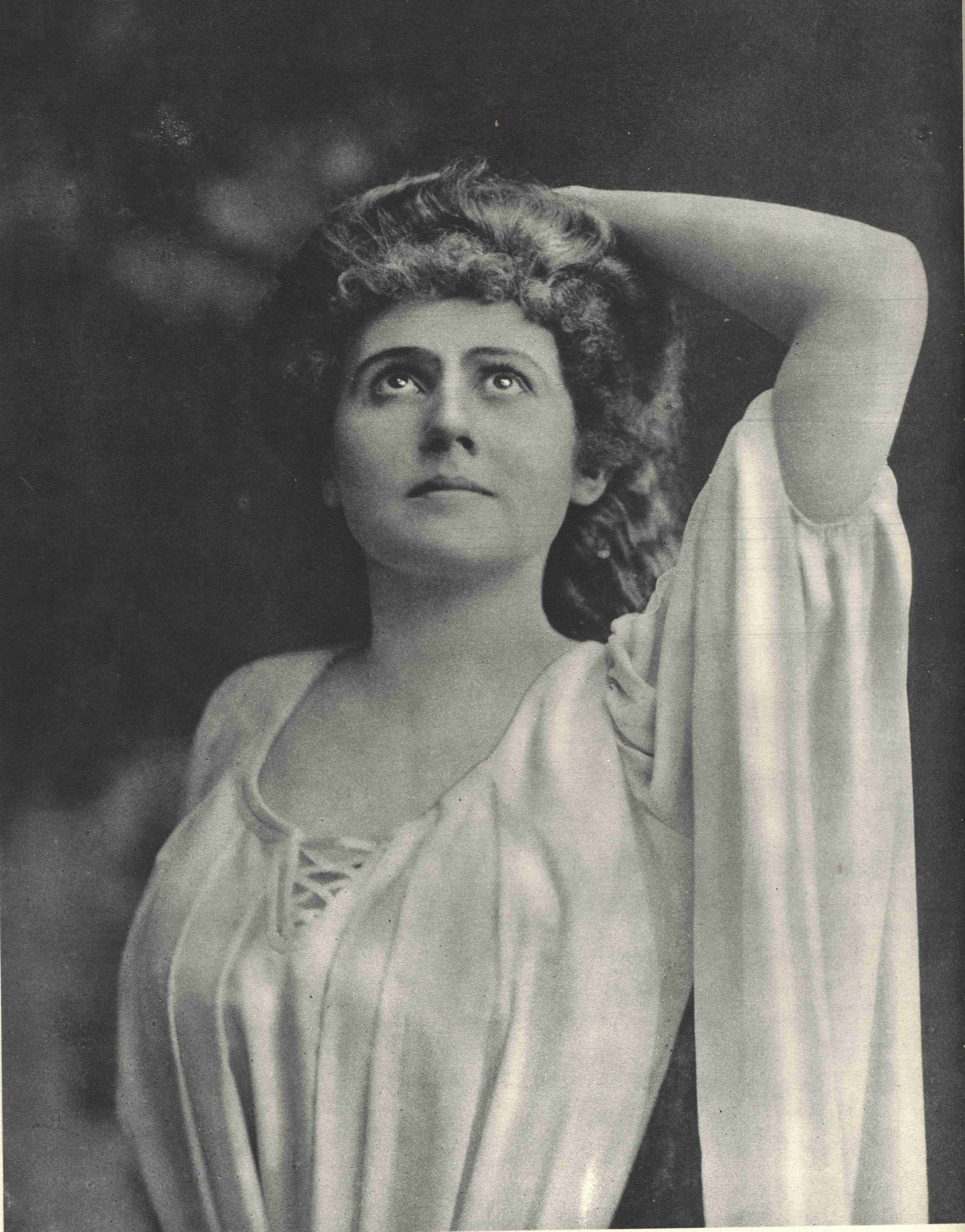
As Alcestis at Paris Opera in 1900

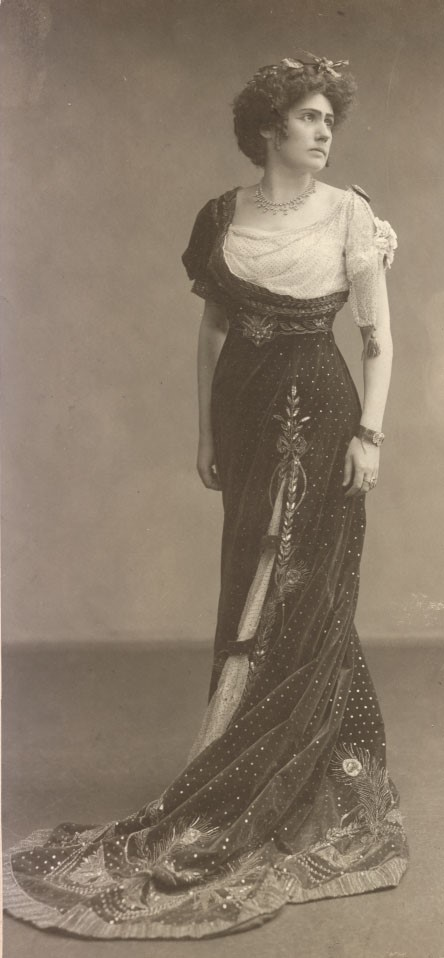
In her outfit for Tosca, c. 1900

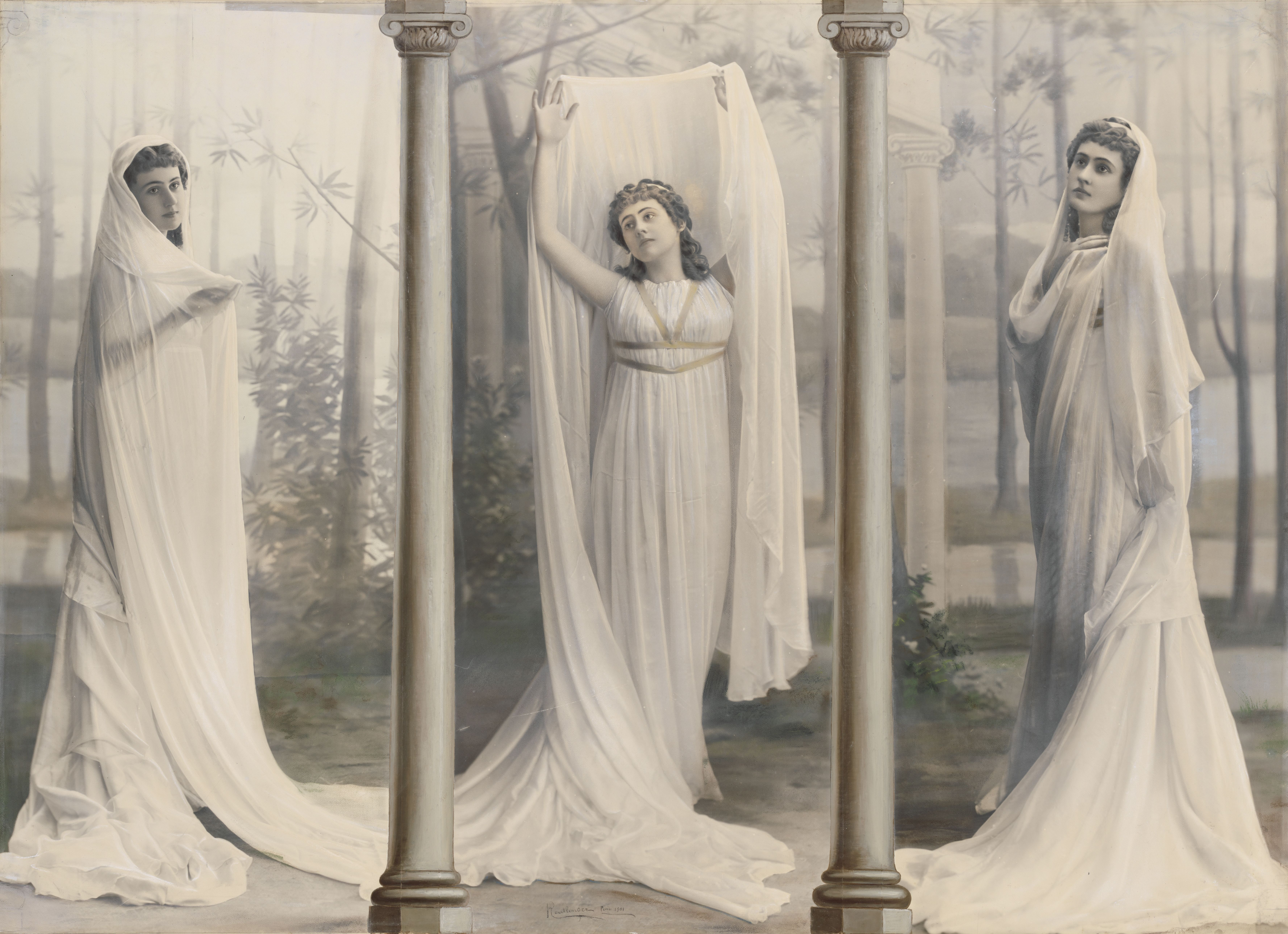
Photographed by Léopold-Émile Reutlinger in 1901

As Elsa in Lohengrin, 1903

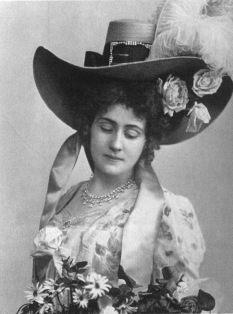
As Tosca in 1905

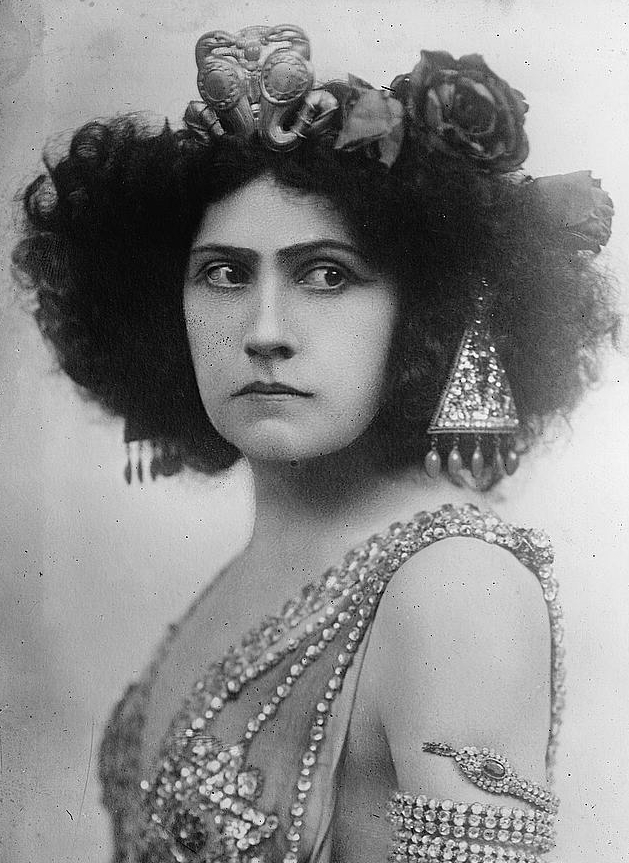
As Salome, 1911

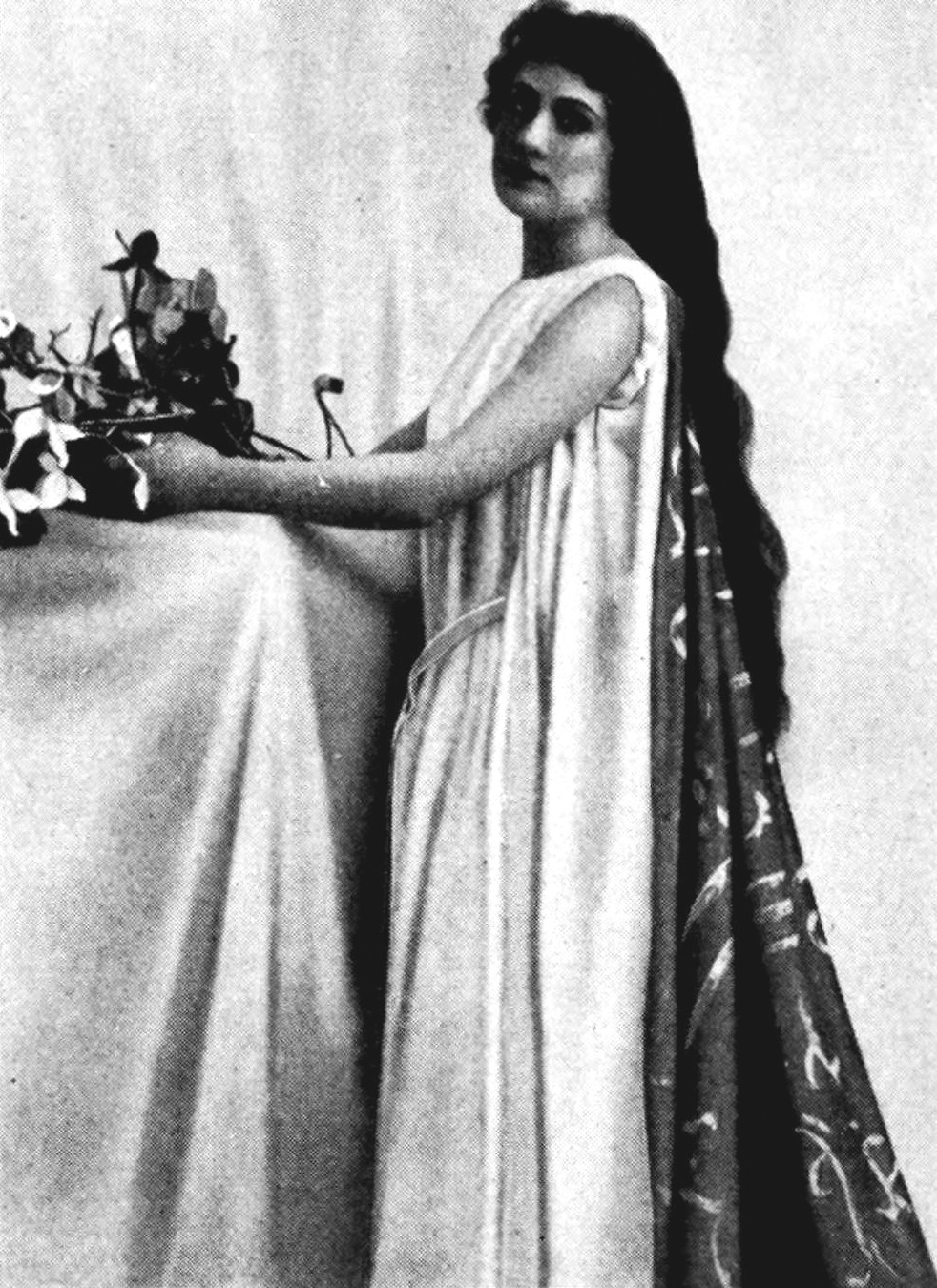
Ackté as Elsa, 1917

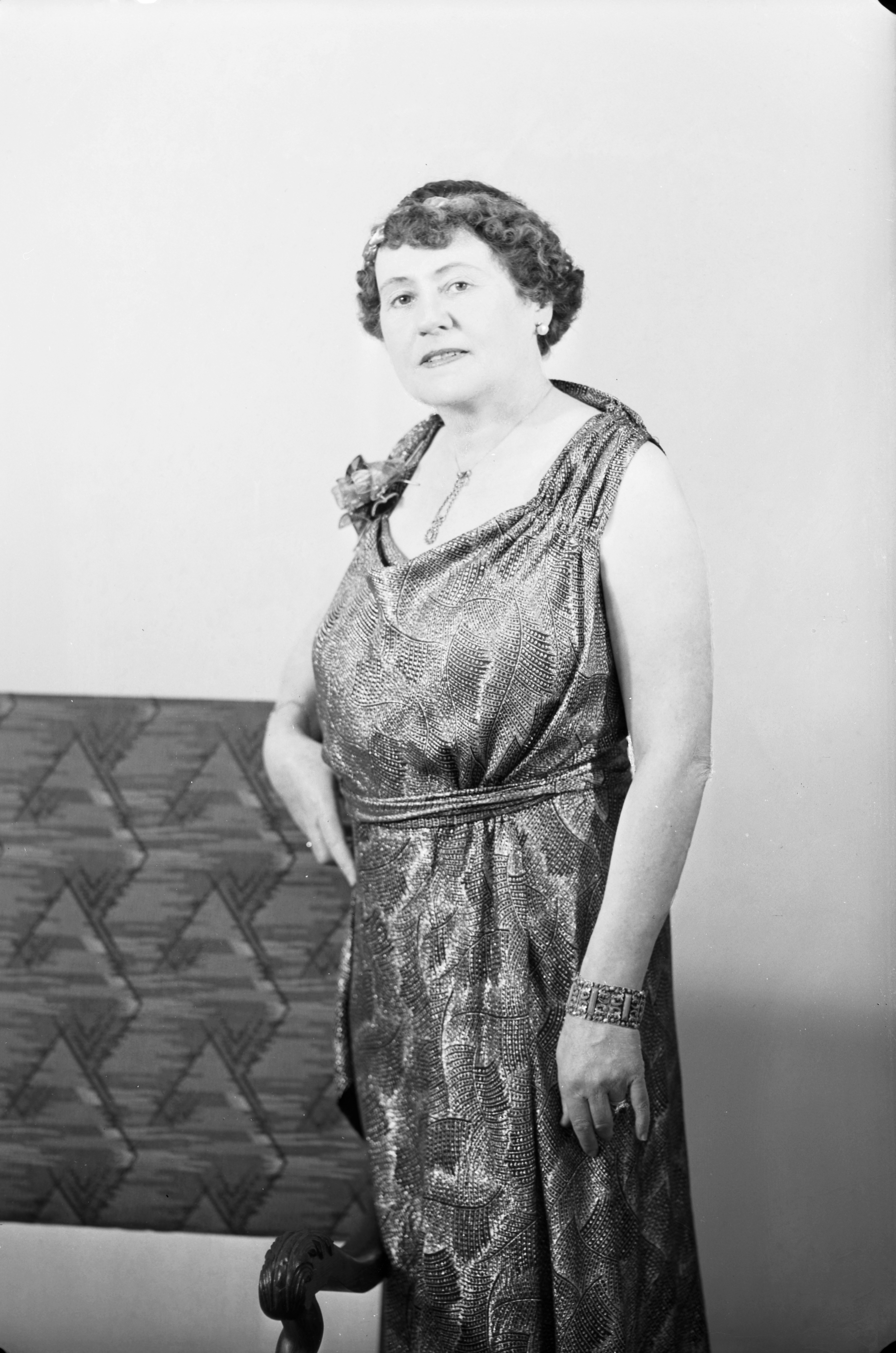
Later in life in 1938
