= Elin Fohström =

Finnish operatic soprano (1868–1949)

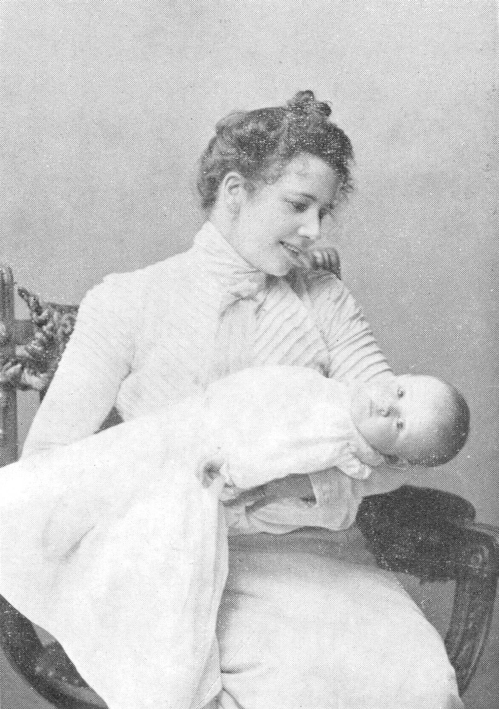
- Fohström and her daughter Inger, 1902
- Born: 22 September 1868; Helsinki, Finland
- Died: 19 April 1949 (aged 80); Helsinki, Finland
- Spouse: Hjalmar Tallqvist (m. 1897)
- Relatives: Alma Fohström (sister)
- Musical career
- Also known as: Elina Vandár
- Genres: Opera
- Occupations: Operatic soprano, teacher

Elin Fohström-Tallqvist, stage name Elina Vandár, (22 September 1868 – 19 April 1949) was a Finnish operatic soprano who performed in Finland, Russia, the Baltic countries, Germany and Italy at the end of the 19th century. After a relatively short but successful singing career, she returned to Helsinki where she worked as a voice teacher.

== Biography ==
Born in Helsinki, Fohström was the daughter of August Fridolf Fohström (1828–1893), a rich Swedish-speaking Finnish merchant, and his wife, Henriette Sofia Stenqvist (1834–1918). One of seven children, she was the sister of cellist Ossian Fohström and fellow opera singer Alma Fohström. Her sister Alma paid for her studies in Florence (1886–87) after which she studied in Paris under Pauline Viardot.

After appearing in a concert in Helsinki in 1887, she made her operatic début as Margarete in Gounod's Faust (opera) in 1889. From 1893, she toured Italy, Russia, and the Baltic countries. She received excellent reviews for the operas she performed in Germany in 1897. That year she married Hjalmar Tallqvist, performing in Roméo et Juliette, The Barber of Seville and Carmen in Zürich where her husband was teaching at the university. She then retired from the stage, performing only in benefit concerts. She spent her later years as a voice teacher in her native Helsinki where she died on 19 April 1949, aged 80.
