= Alma Fohström =

Finnish operatic soprano

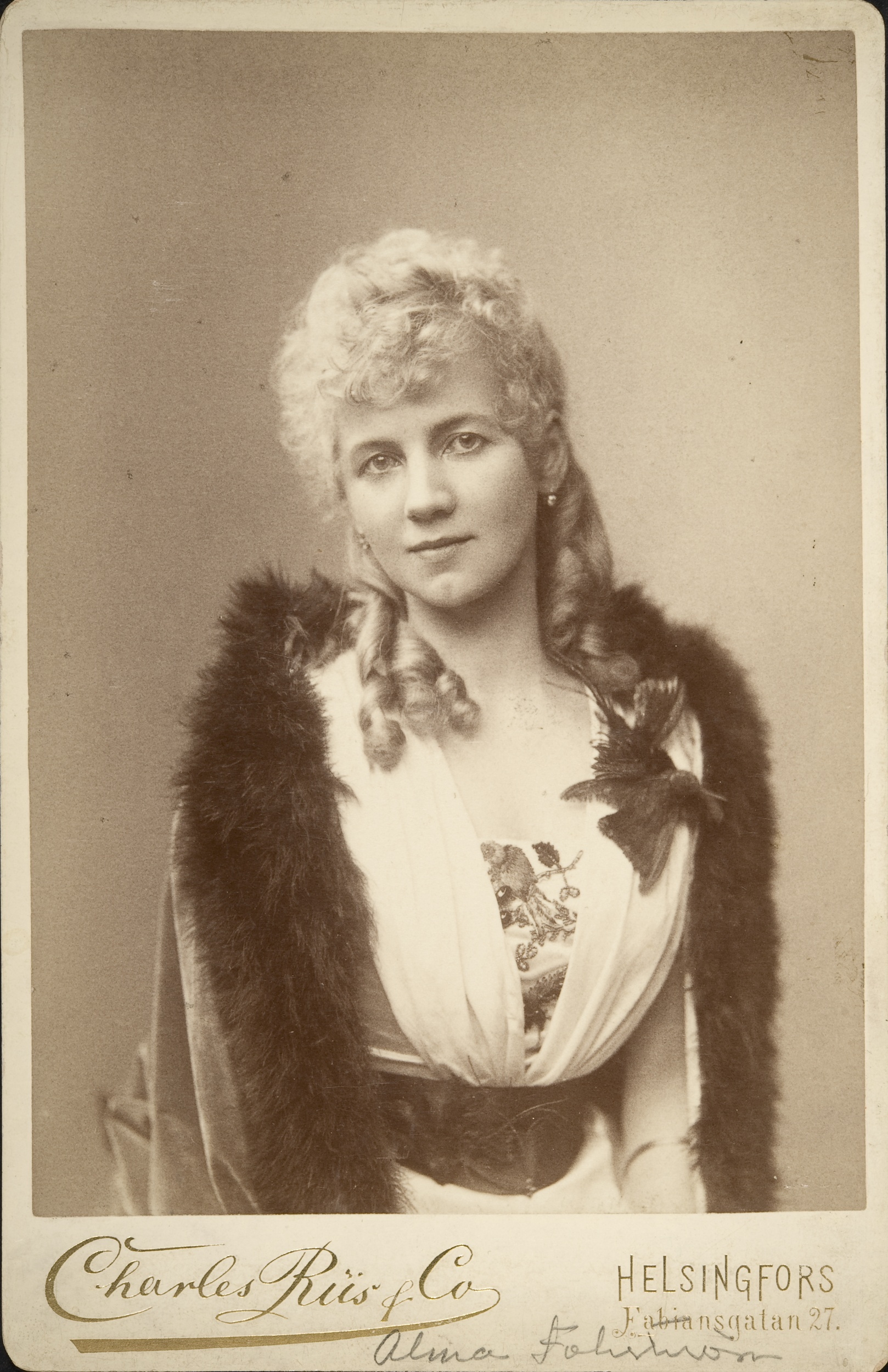
- Alma Fohström, c. 1880s
- Born: 2 January 1856; Helsinki, Finland
- Died: 20 February 1936 (aged 80); Helsinki, Finland
- Education: Saint Petersburg Conservatory
- Relatives: Elin Fohström (sister)
- Musical career
- Genres: Opera
- Occupations: Coloratura soprano, educator

Alma Evelina Fohström-von Rode (1856–1936) was a Finnish operatic coloratura soprano who gained international fame as she performed in the world's most famous opera houses and for a number of monarchs and emperors. “Finnish Nightingale” Alma Fohström was one of the famous sopranos in the late 19th century due to the purity and beauty of her lyrical voice and the high quality of her bel canto technique. Her voice had perfectly equalized vocal registers and a silver tone. Regarding her voice, international music critics said that Nordic prima donna Alma Fohström had a crystalline, and a very high soprano voice. Her vocal range was wide from low a to high F (a–f3).

== Biography ==
Born on 2 January 1856 in Helsinki, Fohström was the daughter of August Fridolf Fohström (1828–93), a rich Swedish-speaking Finnish merchant, and his wife, Henriette Sofia Stenqvist (1834–1918). One of seven children, she was the sister of cellist Ossian Fohström and opera singer Elin Fohström. From an early age, she was recognized as being musically talented, soon attending Anna Blomqvist's music school. From 1873 to 1877, she studied under Henriette Nissen-Saloman at the Saint Petersburg Conservatory. She made her debut at the Finnish Opera in 1878.

In April 1878, Fohström performed at Berlin's Kroll Opera House, gaining immediate recognition. She went on to perform in some 200 venues in Europe, Asia and the Americas, singing for emperors and monarchs including Oscar II of Sweden, Wilhelm II of Germany, Franz Joseph of Austria, and Pedro I of Brazil.

A South American tour in 1883 included performances in Buenos Aires, Montevideo, São Paulo and Rio de Janeiro. Her amazingly successful tour of the United States in 1885–86 included ten cities from New York to Cincinnati and in San Francisco, with outstanding acclamation in the press. In New York City, she performed at the Academy of Music in the title role of Vincent Wallace's opera Maritana, as Zerlina in Danil Auber's Fra Diavolo, and as Filina in Ambroise Thomas' Mignon. She also performed the title role in Bellini's La sonnambula during the US tour. The opera company was brought to the United States by James Henry Mapleson who had previously introduced Fohström in London at Covent Garden's Royal Italian Opera, with her performance of Gaetano Donizetti's Lucia di Lammermoor. Returning from the United States, the group of performers made a tour of the English provinces and the following year, Fohström again sang at the Royal Italian Opera.

In 1887, she performed in London's Albert Hall in a concert celebrating Queen Victoria's 50th anniversary. She made another successful tour of the United States in 1888, becoming the first Finnish opera singer to perform at the Metropolitan Opera in 1889. In the 1889 Met season, she performed as Marguerite in Meyerbeer's Les Huguenots, Mathilde in Rossini's William Tell, Margaretha in Gounod's Faust, Bertha in Meyerbeer's The Prophet, and Eudora in Halévy's La Juive.

Fohström was particularly popular in Russia where she sang for Alexander II, Alexander III and at the coronation of Nicholas II in 1896. She starred at Moscow's Bolshoi Theatre from 1890 to 1899, taught at the St Petersburg Conservatory and toured throughout the country.

Among her most notable operatic roles were Violetta in La traviata, Gilda in Rigoletto, Elsa in Lohengrin and the title role in Lucia di Lammermoor. She is also remembered for Rosina in The Barber of Seville and her leading roles in operas by Verdi, Gounod and Glinka.

Following a singing career of over 25 years, Fohstrøm became professor of singing at the St Petersburg Conservatory from 1909 to the Russian Revolution in 1917. She then returned to Finland before teaching at the Stern Conservatory in Berlin from 1920 to 1928. Thereafter she taught at the Helsinki Conservatory.

Alma Fohström died in Helsinki on 20 February 1936, aged 80.
