= Finnish National Opera and Ballet =

- Suomen Kansallisooppera ja -baletti Finlands Nationalopera och -balett
- Finnish National Opera and Ballet
- Interactive map of the Finnish National Opera and Ballet area

General information
- Type: Culture
- Location: Helsinginkatu 58, Helsinki, Finland
- Coordinates: 60°10′54″N 024°55′47″E
- Completed: 1993

The Finnish National Opera and Ballet (Finnish: Suomen Kansallisooppera ja -baletti; Swedish: Finlands Nationalopera och -balett) is a Finnish opera company and ballet company based in Helsinki. It is headquartered in the Opera House on the coast of the Töölönlahti bay in Töölö, which opened in 1993, and is state-owned through Senate Properties. The Opera House features two auditoriums, the main auditorium with 1,350, seats and a smaller studio auditorium with 300–500 seats.

== History ==
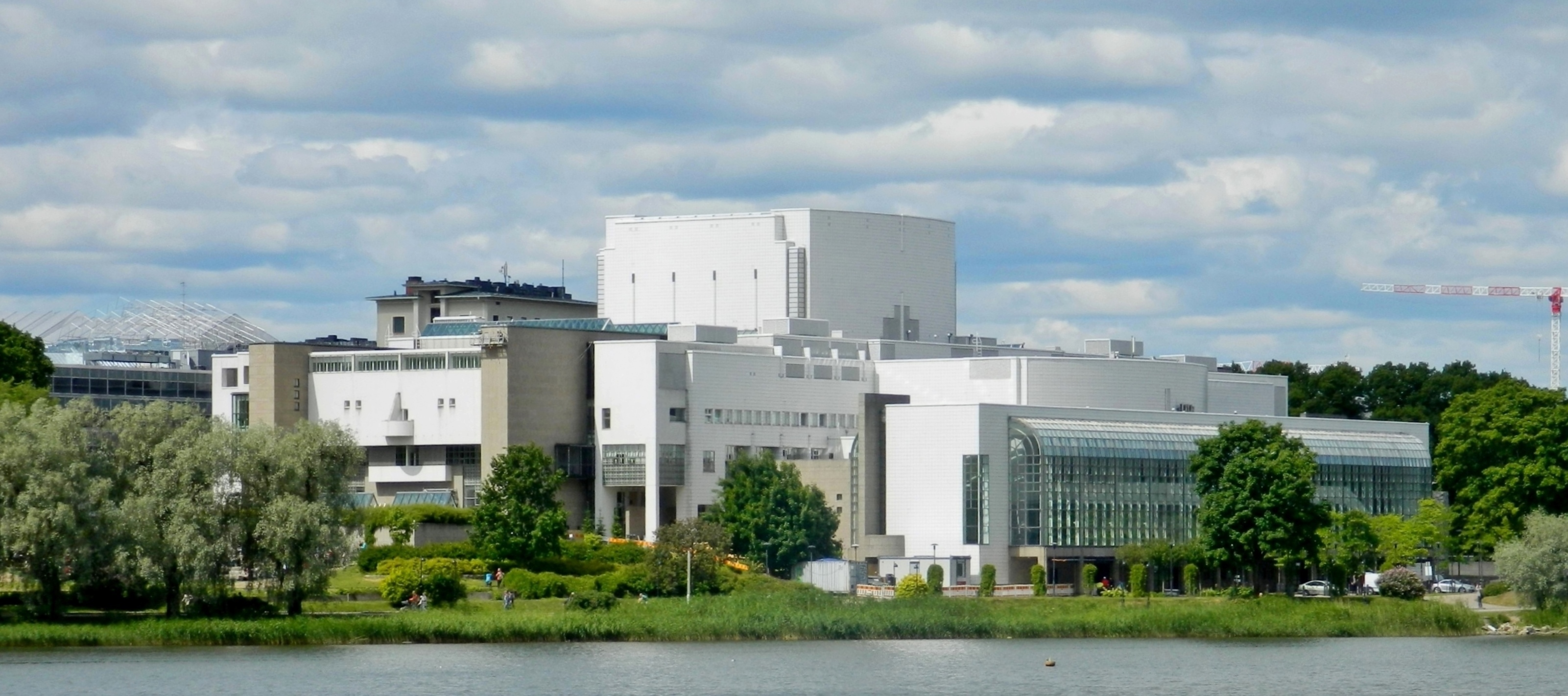
The Opera House by Töölönlahti in Helsinki.

Regular opera performances began in Finland in 1873 with the founding of the Finnish Opera by Kaarlo Bergbom. Prior to that, opera had been performed in Finland sporadically by touring companies, and on occasion by Finnish amateurs, the first such production being The Barber of Seville in 1849. However, the Finnish Opera company soon plunged into a financial crisis and folded in 1879. During its six years of operation, Bergbom's opera company had given 450 performances of a total of 26 operas, and the company had managed to demonstrate that opera can be sung in Finnish too. After the disbandment of the Finnish Opera, the opera audiences of Helsinki had to confine themselves to performances of visiting opera companies and occasional opera productions at the Finnish National Theatre.

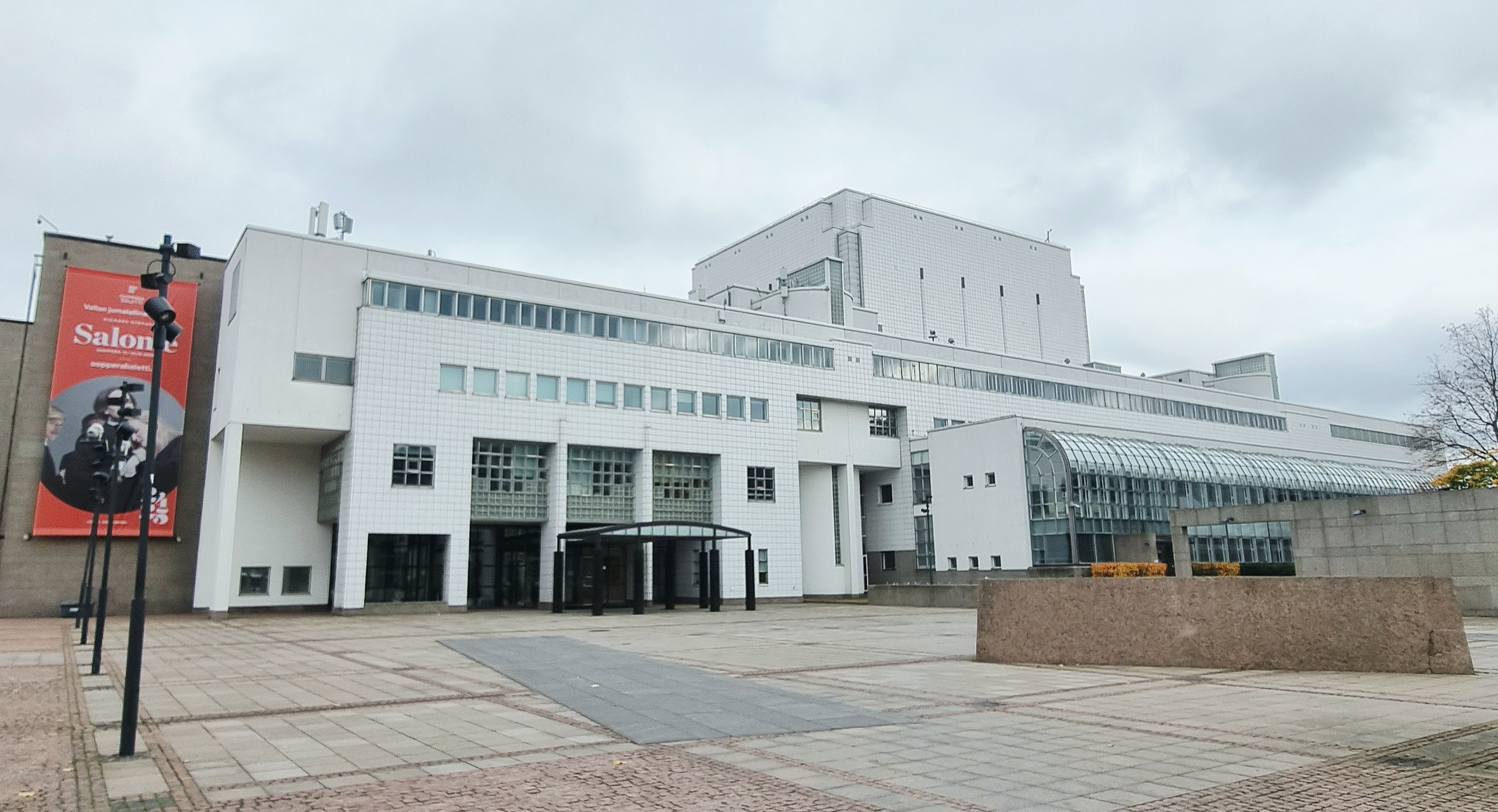
Finnish National Opera and Ballet's entrance at Mannerheimintie.

The reincarnation of the Finnish opera institution took place about 30 years later. A group of notable social and cultural figures, led by the international star soprano Aino Ackté, founded the Domestic Opera in 1911. From the very beginning, the opera decided to engage both foreign and Finnish artists. A few years later the Domestic Opera was renamed the Finnish Opera in 1914. In 1956, the Finnish Opera was, in turn, taken over by the Foundation of the Finnish National Opera, and acquired its present name.

Between 1918 and 1993, the home of the opera was the Alexander Theater, which had been assigned to the company on a permanent basis. The home was inaugurated with an opening performance of Verdi's Aida. When the first dedicated opera house in Finland was finally completed and inaugurated in 1993, the old opera house was given back its original name, the Alexander Theater, after the Tsar Alexander II.

In 2020, in response to the COVID-19 pandemic and the cancellation of many of its planned productions, Finnish National Opera commissioned, created, and produced Covid fan tutte, a comic opera using music from Mozart's Cosi fan tutte, starring a Finnish cast and premiering in late August 2020 with social distancing restrictions. A filmed performance of the opera, with English and Finnish subtitles, is made available online worldwide through 30 March 2021.

== Personnel ==
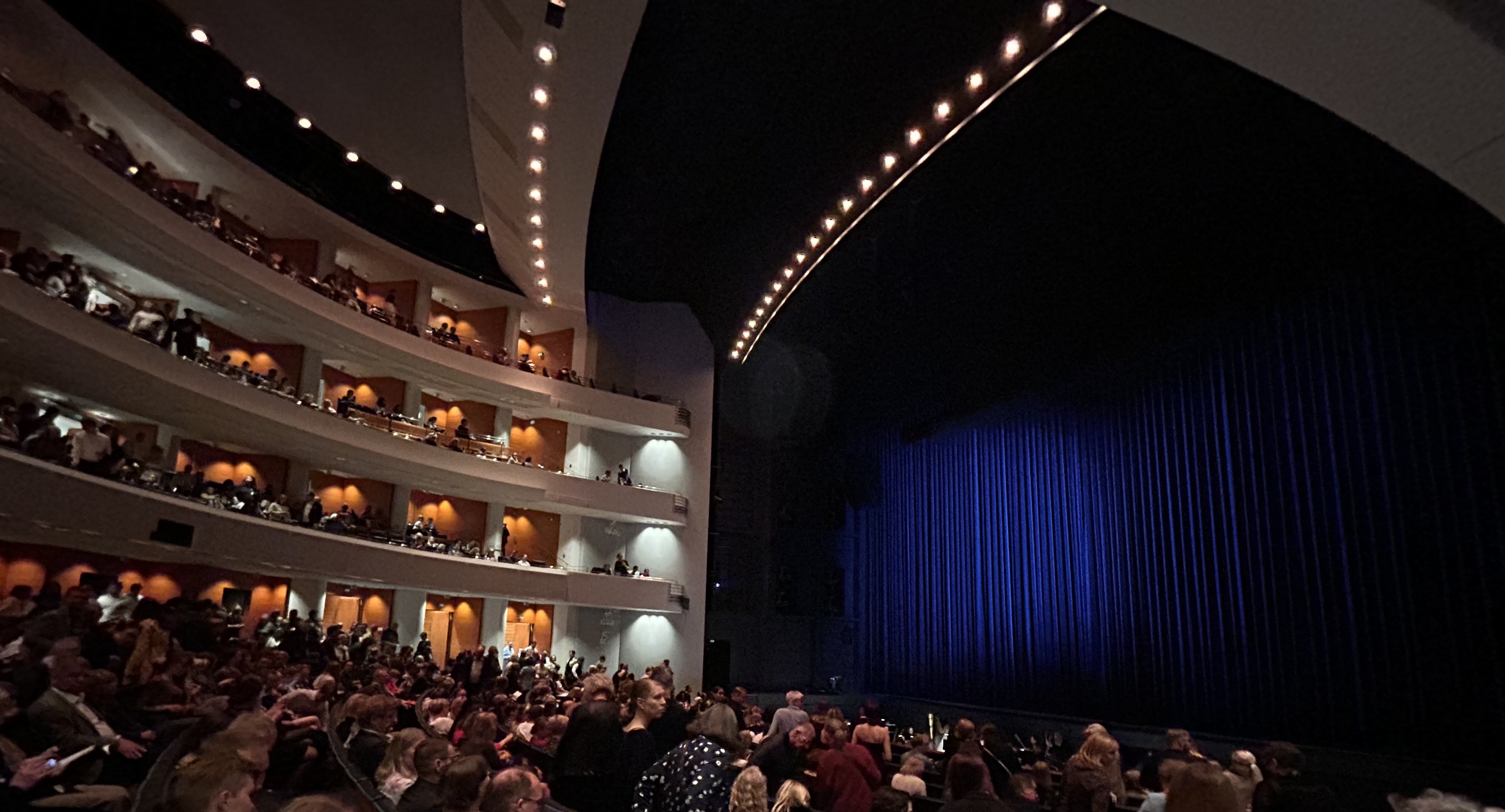
The auditorium.

The Finnish National Opera has some 30 permanently engaged solo singers, a professional choir of 60 singers and its own orchestra of 120 members. The Ballet has 90 dancers from 17 countries. All together, the opera has a staff of 735.

Past music directors and chief conductors have included Armas Järnefelt (1932–36), Tauno Pylkkänen (1960–1967), Okko Kamu (1996–2000), Muhai Tang (2003–2006), and Mikko Franck (2006–2013). With the 2013–2014 season, the Finnish mezzo-soprano Lilli Paasikivi became artistic director of the company, and the German conductor Michael Güttler became principal conductor with the company. The initial contracts for both Paasikivi and Güttler were for 3 years. In August 2017, the company announced the appointment of Patrick Fournillier as its new principal guest conductor, effective with the 2017–2018 season. In December 2018, the company announced the most recent extension of Paasikivi's contract through 2023. Following the conclusion of Paasikivi's tenure, Thomas de Mallet Burgess became artistic director of the company. In May 2026, the company announced the extension of Thomas de Mallet Burgess' contract as artistic director through 2030.

In May 2019, the company announced the appointment of Hannu Lintu as its next chief conductor, effective from 1 January 2022 to 30 June 2026. Lintu concluded his tenure with the company at the close of the 2025-2026 season. In May 2026, the company announced the appointment of Dima Slobodeniouk as its next principal conductor, effective 1 August 2026, with an initial four-year contract through 31 July 2030.

From 2008 to 2018, Kenneth Greve was artistic director of Finnish National Ballet. In December 2017, the company announced the appointment of Madeleine Onne as the next artistic director of Finnish National Ballet, effective August 2018.

== Productions ==
The Finnish National Opera stages four to six premieres a year, including a world premiere of at least one Finnish opera, such as Rasputin by Einojuhani Rautavaara. Some 20 different operas in 140 performances are found in the opera's schedule yearly. The Ballet arranges some 110 performances annually. The Finnish National Opera has some 250,000 visitors a year.

== See also ==
- Alexander Theatre
