= The Maiden of the North =

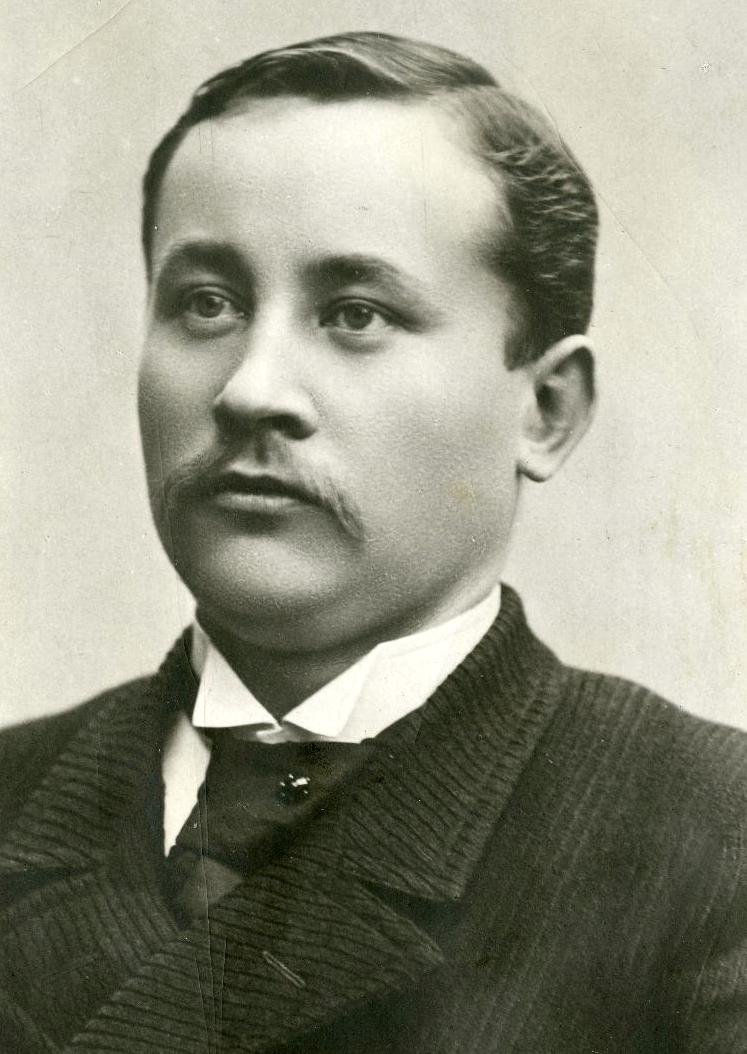
The young composer (c. 1898)

The Maiden of the North (in Finnish: Pohjan neiti) is an opera in three acts written in 1898 by the Finnish composer Oskar Merikanto. The piece was a collaboration with the Finnish author Antti Rytkönen, the Finnish-language libretto of whom was based on a script by the Finnish opera singer Lorenz Nikolai Achté. The opera tells a story from The Kalevala, Finland's national epic, in which the old wizard Väinämöinen and the blacksmith Ilmarinen, as rival suitors, vie for the hand of the beautiful Maiden of Pohjola; she is the daughter of Louhi, the villainous Queen of the Northland. Although rarely performed, The Maiden of the North retains a degree of historical significance as the first Finnish-language opera.

== Composition ==
Merikanto wrote The Maiden of the North in response to an 1898 advertisement by the Finnish Literature Society, which was holding a contest for a Finnish-language opera about Finnish mythology or history. (A first competition launched in 1891 had received no submissions.) (Note: The Finnish Literature Society was executing the will of the Finnish businessmen Johan Daniel Stenberg and his wife Mathilda, who had died in 1880 and 1891, respectively. As patrons of the arts, they left money to fund the a competition to produce the first Finnish-language opera.) At the time, all extant operas by Finnish composers—for example, Fredrik Pacius's King Charles's Hunt (Kung Karls jakt, 1852) and Jean Sibelius's The Maiden in the Tower (Jungfrun i tornet, 1896)—had been written to Swedish-language libretti. In March 1899, Merikanto won the competition by default: his The Maiden of the North was the only submission. The awards jury, which included such Helsinki luminaries as Kaarlo Bergbom, Richard Faltin, Arvid Genetz, Robert Kajanus, and Sibelius, was "extremely critical" of Merikanto's music, arguing that it was "simple"; but because Merikanto had met the parameters of the contest to create a national opera, the awards jury had little choice but to approve his entry. Nevertheless, the jury refused to stage The Maiden of the North, even though Bergbom's Finnish Theatre would have been an obvious venue to premiere the work.

== Premiere ==
The Maiden of the North waited a decade for its first performance, which occurred in the Vyborg Theatre at the 1908 Vyborg (Viipuri) Song Festival (Viipurin laulujuhlilla). Merikanto conducted the town orchestra, which had to be reinforced by 35 musicians from the Helsinki Orchestral Society, and an amateur chorus comprising local singers and students from the Vyborg Church Music School. The cast included some of Finland's leading soloists, who created the following roles:

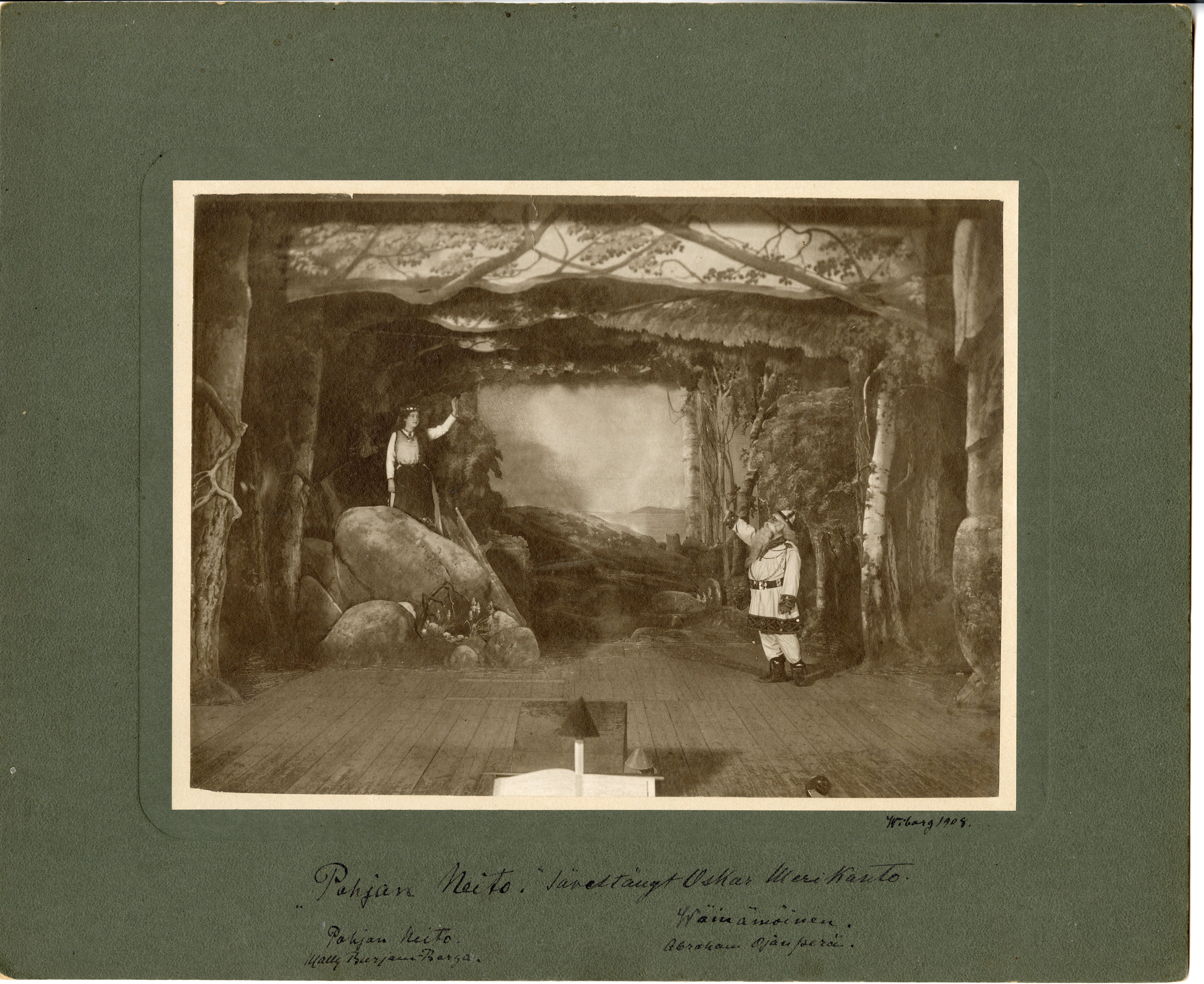
A scene from the 1908 premiere in Vyborg, with the soprano Mally Burjam-Borga as the Maiden and the baritone Abraham Ojanperä as her suitor, Väinämöinen.

Roles	Voice type	Premiere cast (1908)
The Maiden of the North, daughter of Louhi	Soprano	Mally Burjam-Borga
Annikki, sister of Ilmarinen	Soprano	Aino Halonen
Tuonetar, the queen of Tuonela	Contralto	Liisi Gussander
Louhi, the queen of Pohjola	Mezzo-soprano	Alexandra Ahnger
Ilmarinen, the blacksmith and god who pursues the Maiden	Tenor	Wäinö Sola
Väinämöinen, the wizard and demigod who pursues the Maiden	Baritone	Abraham Ojanperä
Pellervoinen	Baritone	Ferdinand Taberman
Ghost of Vipunen, a giant with magic spells	Bass	Oskari Kaakonkalvo

== Notes, references, and sources ==
Notes

Sources

- Ketomäki, Hannele (2017). "The Premiere of Pohjan neiti at the Vyborg Song Festival, 1908". In Kauppala, Anne; Broman-Kananen, Ulla-Britta; Hesselager, Jens (eds.). Tracing Operatic Performances in the Long Nineteenth Century: Practices, Performers, Peripheries. Helsinki: Sibelius Academy. pp. 269–288. ISBN 978-9-523-29090-7.
- Korhonen, Kimmo [in Finnish] (2007) [2003]. Inventing Finnish Music: Contemporary Composers from Medieval to Modern. Translated by Mäntyjärvi, Jaakko [in Finnish] (2nd ed.). Jyväskylä, Finland: Finnish Music Information Center (FIMIC) & Gummerus Kirjapaino Oy. ISBN 978-9-525-07661-5.
