= Rafael Hertzberg =

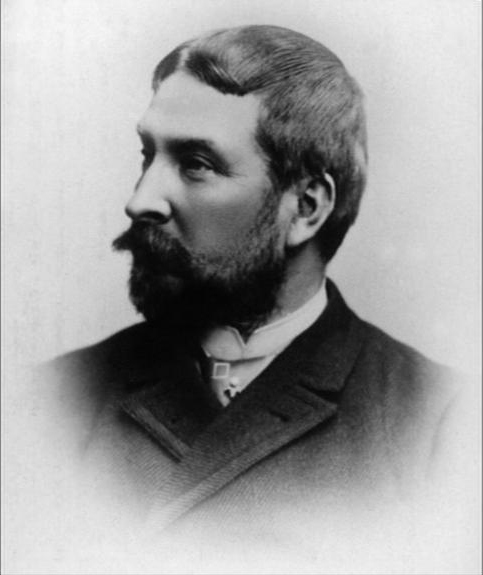
- Rafael Hertzberg
- Born: 18 September 1845; Turku, Finland
- Died: 9 December 1896 (aged 51); Helsinki, Finland
- Occupations: writer, translator, historian, businessman, inventor, publicist
- Known for: Julpolska lyrics

Rafael Hertzberg (18 September 1845 in Turku – 5 December 1896 in Helsinki) was a Finland-Swedish writer, translator, historian, businessman, inventor, and publicist.

== Biography ==
Rafael Hertzberg studied at the Imperial Alexander University (current University of Helsinki) where he graduated with a licentiate degree in 1889. He worked as a literature, theater, and art critic at Helsingfors Dagblad from the end of the 1860s and from 1875–1888 as the newspaper's cultural editor. He later worked at Hufvudstadsbladet and was offered the position of chief editor in 1890.

In the 1890s, Hertzberg was also acting as a Finnish agent for foreign life insurance companies. He also designed a typewriter which was manufactured and marketed by Husqvarna under the trade name Sampo during 1894–95.

As a translator, he initially devoted himself to traditional Finnish folk songs. He performed the first Swedish translation of the play A Doll's House by Henrik Ibsen (1880). He wrote the libretto for Jean Sibelius’ sole opera, Jungfrun i tornet (1896). He also wrote plays, including dramatizations of the poems of Johan Ludvig Runeberg.

He is today mostly known for writing the lyrics of the Christmas song Julpolska ("Nu ha vi ljus här i vårt hus") with music by Johanna Ölander (1827-1909).

He died in 1896 and was buried at Hietaniemi Cemetery in the Etu-Töölö district of Helsinki.

== Works ==
- Ett litet häfte sagor af tz. (1872)
- Fru Karin på Liuksiala (1873)
- Sång och saga (1874)
- Kalevala, berättad för ungdom (1875)
- Ur lifvets vår (1875)
- Finlands historia i korthet framstäld (1876)
- Smärre skizzer (1879)
- Dikter (1880)
- Skämt och allvar för ung och gammal (1880)
- Joulun joutu-ajalla (1881)
- Finska konstnärer (1883)
- Julgubben och tomtarne (1883)
- Seger (1883)
- Två vänner (1883)
- I qvinnofrågan (1884)
- Nordenskiölds resor och äfventyr i polarhafven (1884)
- Nya dikter (1884)
- Kulturbilder ur Finlands historia. 1 (1885)
- Frankrike (1886)
- Genom de svartes verldsdel (1886)
- Lefnadsteckningar för ungdom och för folket (1886)
- Helsingfors-Monaco (1887)
- Statsrådet (1887)
- Helsingfors för 300 år sedan och i våra dagar (1888–1889)
- Kulturbilder ur Finlands historia (1888)
- Landtdagsvalet (1888)
- Löjtnanten (1888)
- Professorer och studenter (1888)
- Pyreneiska halfön (1889–1890)
- Två finska barns äfventyr under en resa kring jorden (1889)
- Vidskepelsen i Finland på 1600-talet (1889)
- De gamla egypternas religion (1890)
- Knekt och bonde (1890)
- Barndomshemmet (1892)
- För smått folk (1895)
- En majdag i Helsingfors (1896)
- Rafael Hertzbergs samlade barnbibliotek (1901)
- Vårt land med flere dramatiseringar (1901)
