= Abraham Ojanperä =

Finnish singer

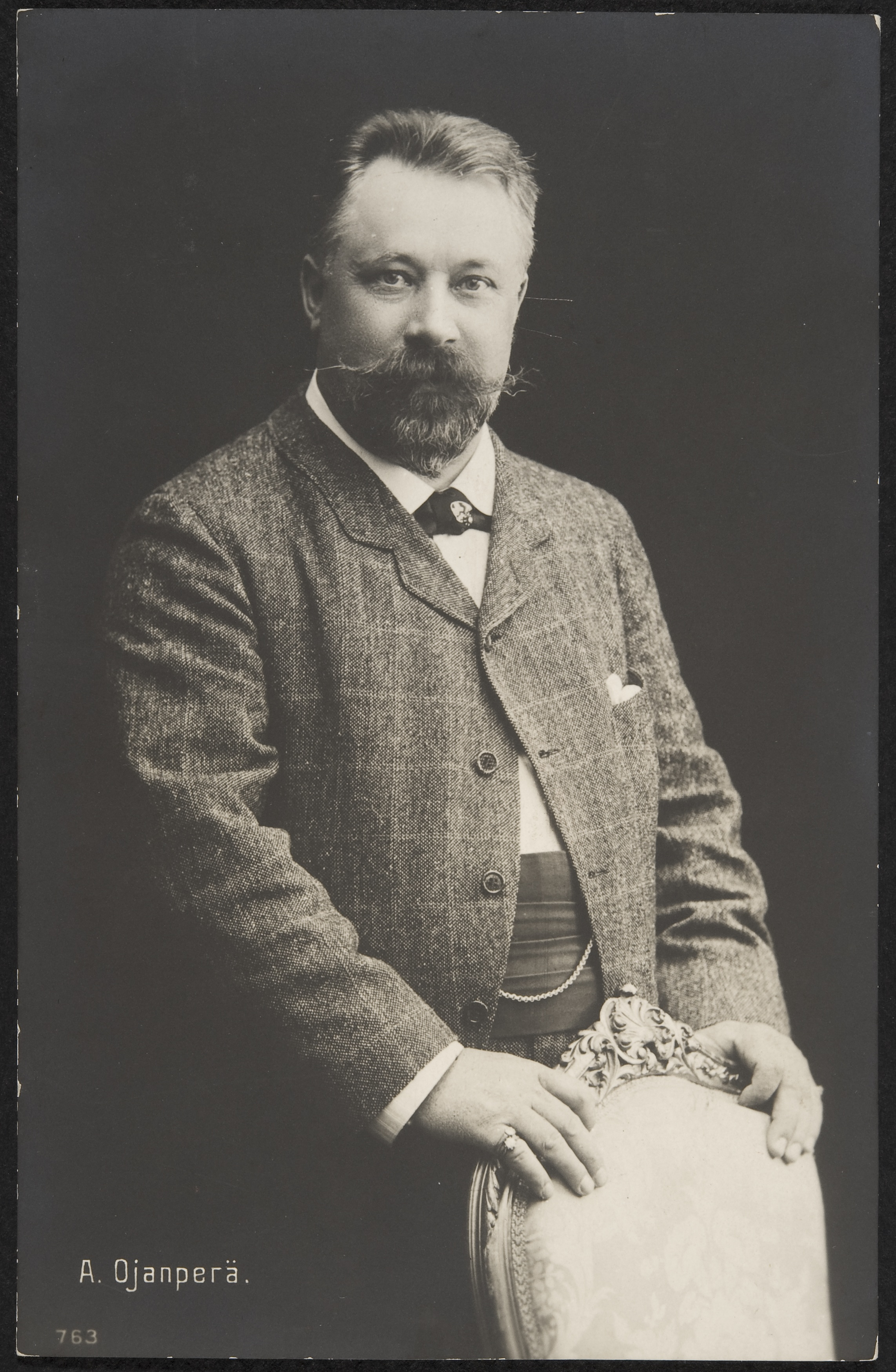
Ojanperä (c. 1890s)

Abraham (Aappo, Aapo, Aapi) Ojanperä (16 September 1856 – 26 February 1916) was a Finnish singer, vocal pedagogist, and cantor. He usually sang bass and baritone roles in oratorios and Finnish operas at a time when the country still lacked a regularly performing opera.

== Childhood and youth ==
Ojanperä was born to a peasant family in Liminka, near Oulu. He was orphaned before the age of two but finished primary school and was able to enroll at the teachers' college in Jyväskylä with the help of local benefactors. He graduated from that institution in 1878 and went to Helsinki to study singing. Ojanperä held his first concert in Helsinki at the end of January of 1881. About a year and six months later, in May 1882, he had another concert at the festive hall of the University of Helsinki, after which he went on to continue his singing studies in Dresden, Germany. Ojanperä became the first Finnish male singer of peasant background to have been educated at a foreign conservatory. Ojanperä dreamed of a career in opera abroad. This, however, did not come to pass. Ojanperä returned to Finland in 1885 and accepted the tenure of teacher of vocal solos at the Helsinki Music Institute (now Sibelius Academy) even though the Finnish senate had granted him a scholarship for a fourth year of study.

== Vocal teacher ==
The musical culture of Finland was still in its infancy. Ojanperä's work as the first tenured, and first Finnish-speaking, vocal solo teacher would become groundbreaking. Ojanperä drafted pedagogical principles of teaching and adapted the methods of basic vocal production exercises for the Finnish climate. In 1892, Ojanperä began as the cantor of the newly built St. John's Church. After having returned from a year-long tour of studying in the Mediterranean countries in 1896, he was also trusted with the task of teaching chorale and church singing at the Faculty of Theology of the University of Helsinki. During his career of thirty years, Ojanperä taught many generations of singers. Among his most famous students were Ida Ekman, Maikki Järnefelt, Alma Kuula, Annikki Uimonen, Gerda Lind, and Eino Rautavaara. Ojanperä was also the first to interpret the works of many students of composition, which spawned partnerships with young composers. Of these, that with Oskar Merikanto, organist at St. John's, was especially intense. Together, Ojanperä and Merikanto organized the Easter concerts of St. John's and a couple of times, annually, would hold long concert tours taking the two of them from the very south to the north of Finland.

== Performing artist ==
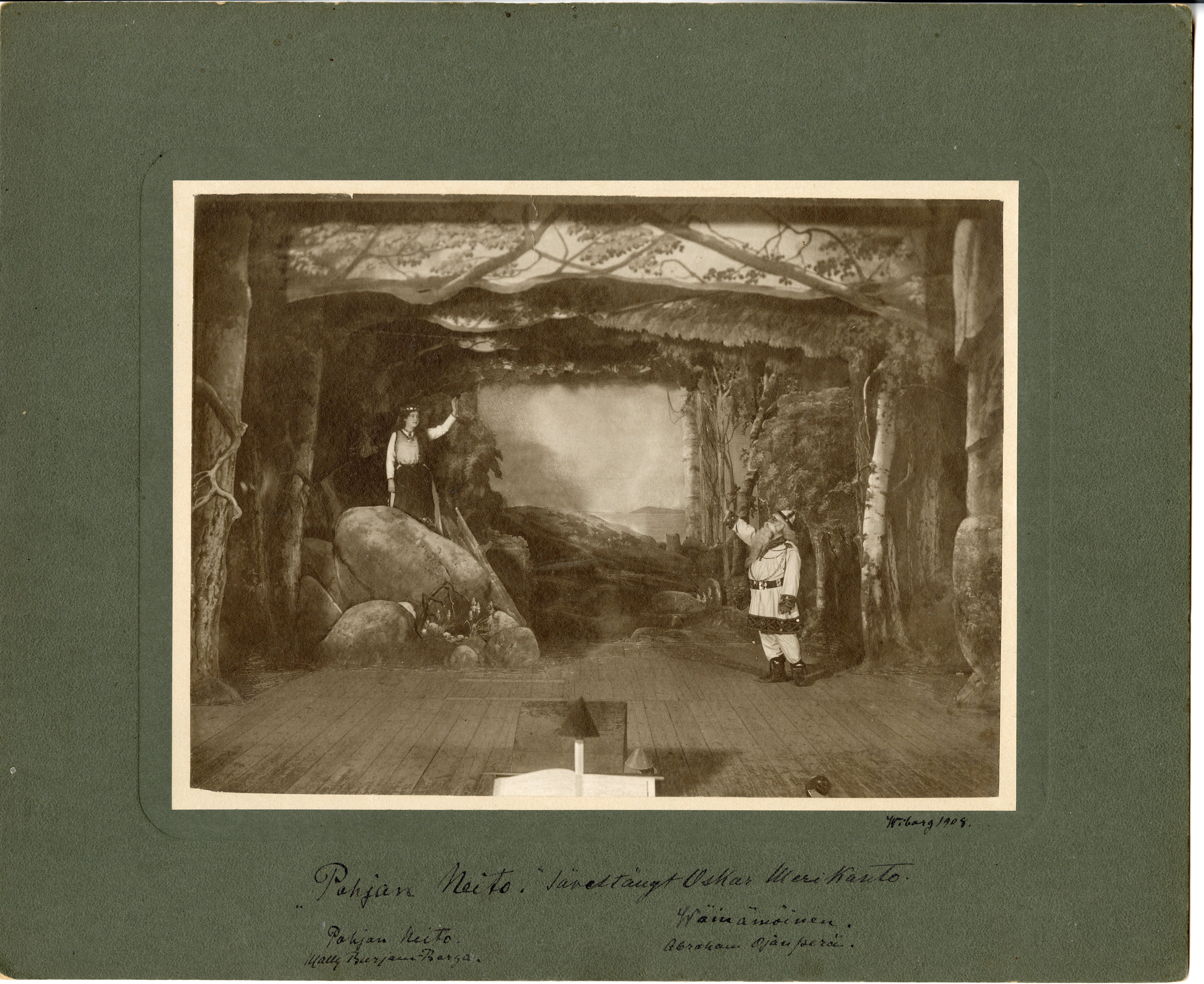
Abraham Ojanperä as Väinämöinen in Oskar Merikanto's opera Maiden of the North, whose title role was sung by Mally Burjam-Borga

Abraham Ojanperä was also one of the first recording vocal artists of Finland. He mostly recorded folk songs and the new songs of young Finnish composers such as Jean Sibelius, Oskar Merikanto, Armas Järnefelt, Erkki Melartin, Otto Kotilainen, and Armas Maasalo. He also selected Finnish music for the two concerts abroad that he organized during his life, one in Berlin in 1895 and one in Christiania (now Oslo) in 1905. He also held concerts at his hometown's Liminka Church whenever he could. Ojanperä sang his last opera role in November 1908. The work in question was Oskar Merkianto's Maiden of the North. The opera, premiered with the same cast in June 1908 at the Vyborg Theater, was part of the program of the Vyborg Song Festival. The composer himself conducted the performance. Ojanperä sang the part of Väinämöinen.

Ojanperä also collaborated frequently with Sibelius. In early 1892, he had debuted three Sibelius songs based on poems by J.L. Runeberg. Other notable premieres by Ojanperä include: the Cantata for the University Graduation Ceremonies of 1894 (JS 105) on 31 May 1894; Serenade (JS 168) on 17 April 1895; The Rapids-Rider's Brides (Op. 33) on 1 November 1897; and The Origin of Fire (Op. 32) on 9 April 1902.

== Later life ==
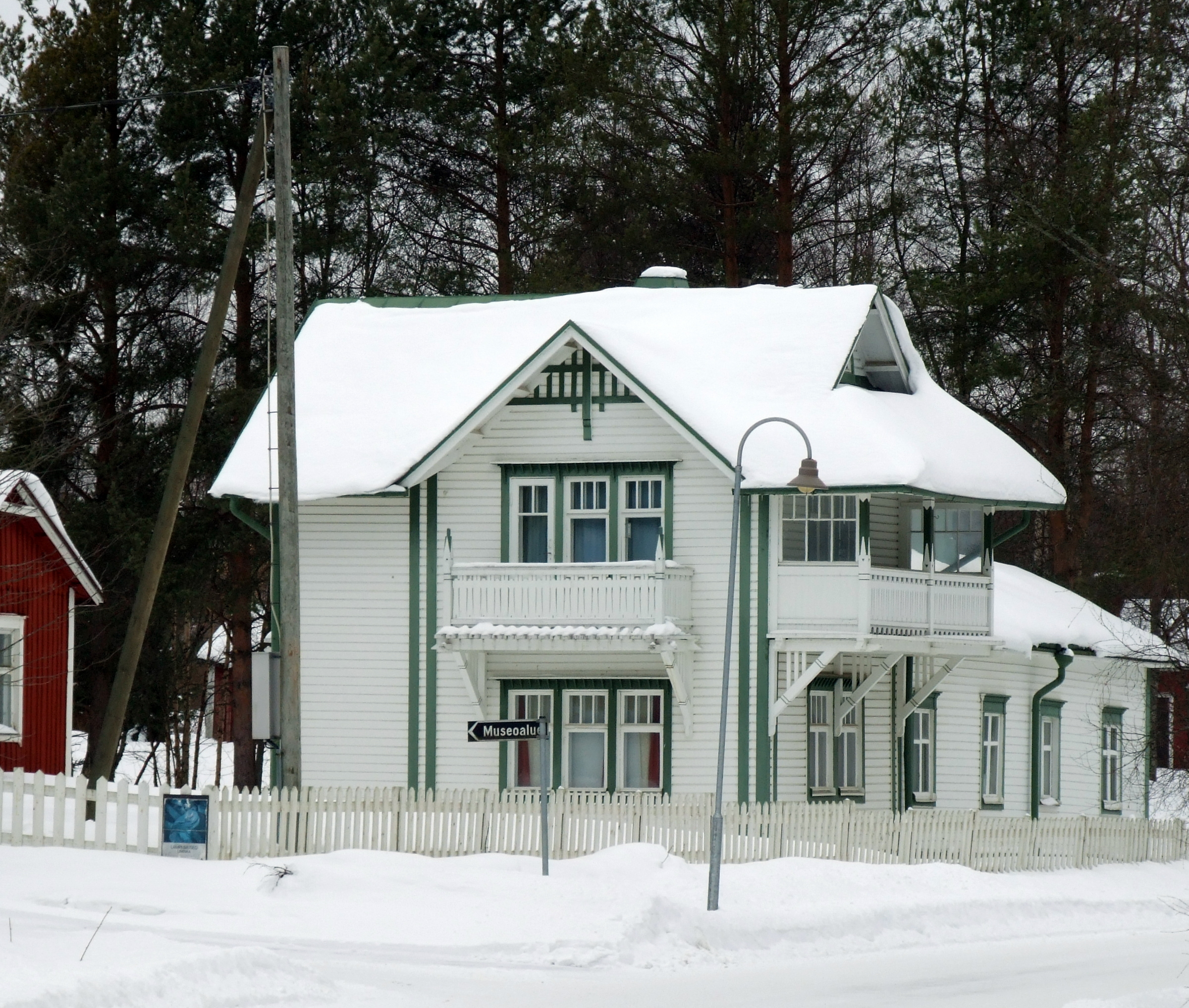
Aappola, the Abraham Ojanperä Museum, in the Liminka Museum District

In the summertime, Ojanperä would spend a lot of time at musical centers in Continental Europe, but as he got older he started spending more time at villa Aappola in Liminka. That is also where he returned to recuperate after his health had suddenly declined in November 1915. He intended to return to teaching, but this did not happen. Ojanperä died, without having a family of his own, in Aappola on 26 February 1916. He had received an extra state pension since the beginning of 1913, although he did not leave his job at the time but rather held his position until his death, which occurred in his home town of Liminka.

== Legacy ==
An "Ojanperä Fund" intended for regularly rewarding talented singers was founded at the Helsinki Music Institute in the early months of 1916. The fund, however, proved unworkable. A film on Ojanperä's life, Ruusu ja kulkuri ('The Rose and the Vagabond'), directed by Ilmari Unho, was completed in 1948. The film was largely fictional and unrelated to real events. Maija-Liisa Näsänen, from Oulu, published Ojanperä's biography in 2008. Before that, written information about the singer had been limited mostly to Ilkka Niemelä's reminiscences published as a booklet, Abraham Ojanperä, hänen testamenttinsa ja Aappolansa ('Abraham Ojanperä, His Testament, and His Aappola', 10 October 1959). Aappola now functions as the Abraham Ojanperä Museum during summers in the Liminka Museum District.
