= Julpolska =

Swedish Christmas song

Song
- Language: Swedish
- Published: 1895
- Genre: Christmas
- Composer: Johanna Ölander
- Lyricist: Rafael Hertzberg

Julpolska, also known as Nu ha vi ljus här i vårt hus, is a Christmas song with lyrics by Rafael Hertzberg (1845–1896) and music by Johanna Ölander (1827–1909). Song lyrics describe Christmas Eve, dated from a time when the Christmas goat at many places still was the giftbringer, not Santa Claus.

The song was also used in the 1987 film Mer om oss barn i Bullerbyn.

== Publication ==
- För smått folk; verser av Rafaël Hertzberg, 1895, entitled "Barnen dansa kring julgranen" (lyrics only).
- Rafaël Hertzbergs barnbibliotek 1: Sagor och berättelser, 1901, "Barnen dansa kring julgranen" (with musical notation).
- Nu ska vi sjunga, 1943, under the lines "Julsånger".
- Julens önskesångbok, 1997, under the lines "Traditionella julsånger"
- Barnens svenska sångbok, 1999, under the lines "Året runt".

== Recordings ==
An early recording was done by Gösta Jonsson and Britt Berg, appearing in a medley of Christmas songs recorded in Berlin in September 1933, and the record came out later that year.

The song has also been recorded with lyrics in Spanish by Maria Llerena as "Que felicidad ya es Navidad" on 1988 album Chiquitico mio.

Trio X (of Sweden) brought out a jazz version of this song on their cd Veni Veni Emmanuel (2020).
