= Johanna Ölander =

- Birth name: Johanna Maria Nordblom
- Born: 23 May 1827
- Died: 16 July 1909 (aged 82); Hedvig Eleonora Parish, Sweden
- Occupation: composer

Johanna Ölander (23 May 1827 – 16 July 1909, Hedvig Eleonora Parish, Stockholm, Sweden) was a Swedish song composer. She wrote the tune for the Christmas song Julpolska ("Nu ha vi ljus, här i vårt hus").

She was married to Per August Ölander.
