= King Christian II (Sibelius) =

Incidental music by Jean Sibelius

- Incidental music by Jean Sibelius
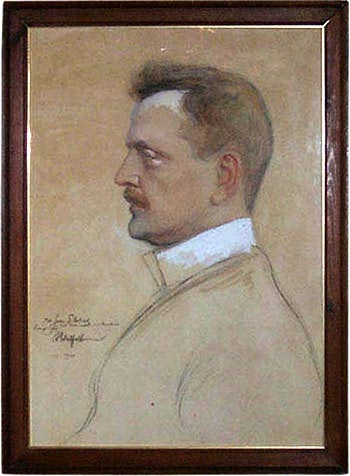
- The composer in 1904, by Albert Edelfelt
- Opus: 27
- Composed: 1898
- Performed: 24 February 1898
- Scoring: orchestra

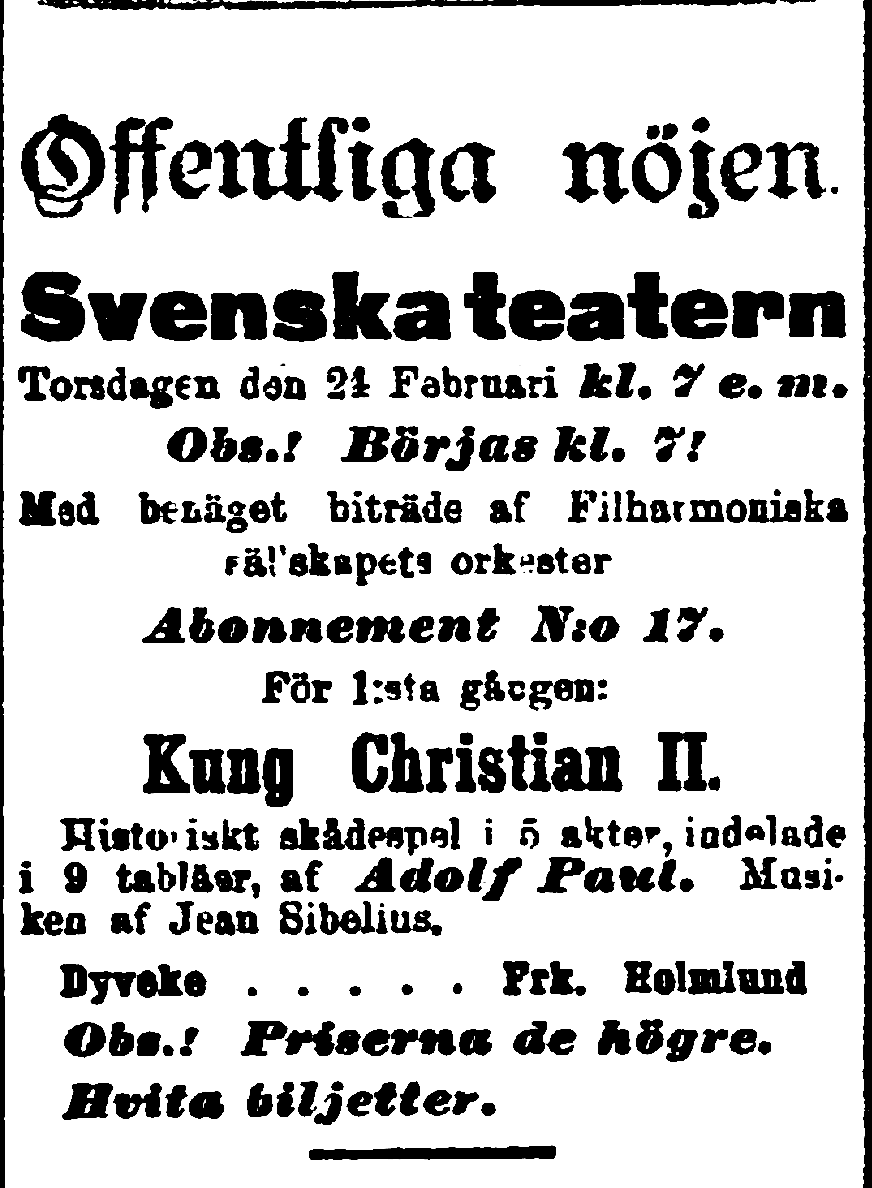
An 24 February 1898 advertisement in Nya Pressen promoting Jean Sibelius's incidental music to King Christian II

King Christian II (Swedish: Kung Kristian II), Op. 27, is incidental music by Jean Sibelius for the Scandinavian historical play of the same name, written by his friend Adolf Paul. The original play deals with the love of King Christian II, ruler of Denmark, Sweden and Norway, for a Dutch girl, Dyvecke, a commoner. Sibelius composed in 1898 seven movements. He conducted the first performance of the first four parts the Swedish Theatre in Helsinki on 24 February 1898. In the following summer, he composed three more movements, Nocturne, Serenade and Ballad. The Nocturne was an interlude between the first act and the second. The position of the serenade changed. The ballad is a dramatic piece about the Stockholm Bloodbath (1520). This movement shows already traits of the later First Symphony. The stage music consists of the following numbers:

1. Elegia
2. Musette
3. Menuetto
4. Sången om korsspindeln
5. Nocturne
6. Serenade
7. Ballade.

Sibelius derived from the incidental music a suite of five movements. A complete performance of the suite takes about 25 minutes. It was first performed in December 1898, conducted by Robert Kajanus. Sibelius wrote in a letter: “The music sounded excellent and the tempi seem to be right. I think this is the first time that I have managed to make something complete.”

The suite was given the British premiere was given on 26 October 1901 at the Promenade Concerts, conducted by Henry Wood at Queen's Hall.

== Movements of the suite ==
The suite consists of five movements:

Movement	Type	Tempo	Notes
1	Nocturne	Molto moderato	A love scene.
2	Elegy	Andante sostenuto	The original introduction to the incidental music. Scored only for strings.
3	Musette	Allegretto	Dyvecke's dance. Originally scored for clarinets and bassoons, but with strings added for the suite.
4	Serenade	Moderato assai (Quasi menuetto)	Taken from the prelude to the third act of the play (music for the court ball).
5	Ballade	Allegro molto	The tempestuous music reflects the anger of the King.
