= Jussi Jalas =

Finnish conductor

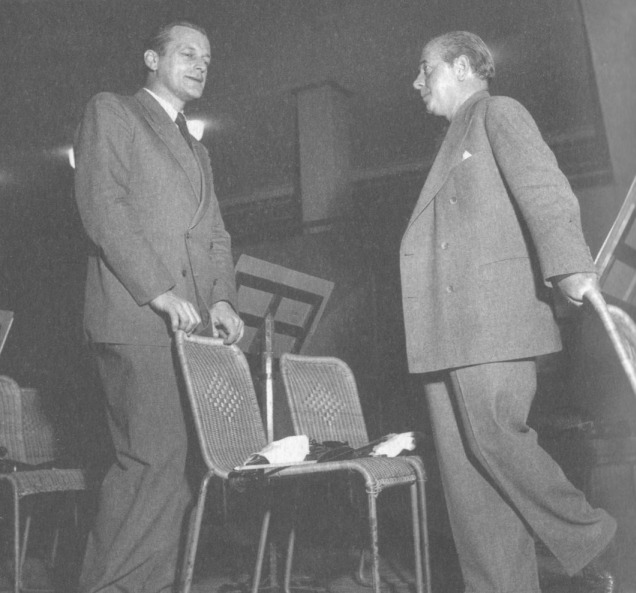
Jussi Jalas (left) with Eugene Ormandy in Helsinki in 1959.

Jussi Jalas (23 June 1908 – 11 October 1985) was a Finnish conductor and composer.

== Biography ==
Jalas was born as Armas Jussi Veikko Blomstedt in Jyväskylä in 1908. His father was Yrjö Blomstedt, an architect known for his National Romantic Jugend architecture. He studied at the Helsingfors Conservatory 1923–30 (later renamed the Sibelius Academy), and then in Paris 1933–34, under Wladimir Pohl, Pierre Monteux and Rhené-Baton. He had further study in Germany, Austria and Italy before returning to Finland.

He changed his surname to Jalas in 1943. He taught at the Sibelius Academy from 1945 to 1965, and was the music director of the Finnish National Opera from 1945. He conducted the Finnish premieres of Benjamin Britten's operas Peter Grimes and The Rape of Lucretia.

His wife Margareta née Sibelius was the daughter of Jean Sibelius, and virtually every one of his concerts included a work by his father-in-law.

His own works included orchestral works, piano music and songs. He died in Helsinki in 1985, aged 77.

== Recordings ==
His discography includes a complete recording of Leevi Madetoja's opera, Juha, with Jorma Hynninen, as well as, for Westminster, Norman Treigle's two recital albums, "Arias from Italian, French and German Opera" (1967) and "Operatic Heroes and Villains" (1968).

For the same label, he conducted Beverly Sills' first recital album, "Bellini and Donizetti Heroines" (1968). Among his "pirated" recordings is that of a 1971 Helsinki concert featuring Anja Silja in excerpts from Götterdämmerung and Tristan und Isolde.

In stereo, The Sibelius Recordings with two Hungarian orchestras are available from Decca. They include The Tempest suites, Finlandia and some rarely heard shorter pieces.

Jalas conducted the premiere of the Saga Symphony by Jón Leifs in Helsinki (1950), and also made the first commercial recording with the Iceland Symphony Orchestra (1975).
