= Oskar Merikanto =

Finnish musician and composer (1868–1924)

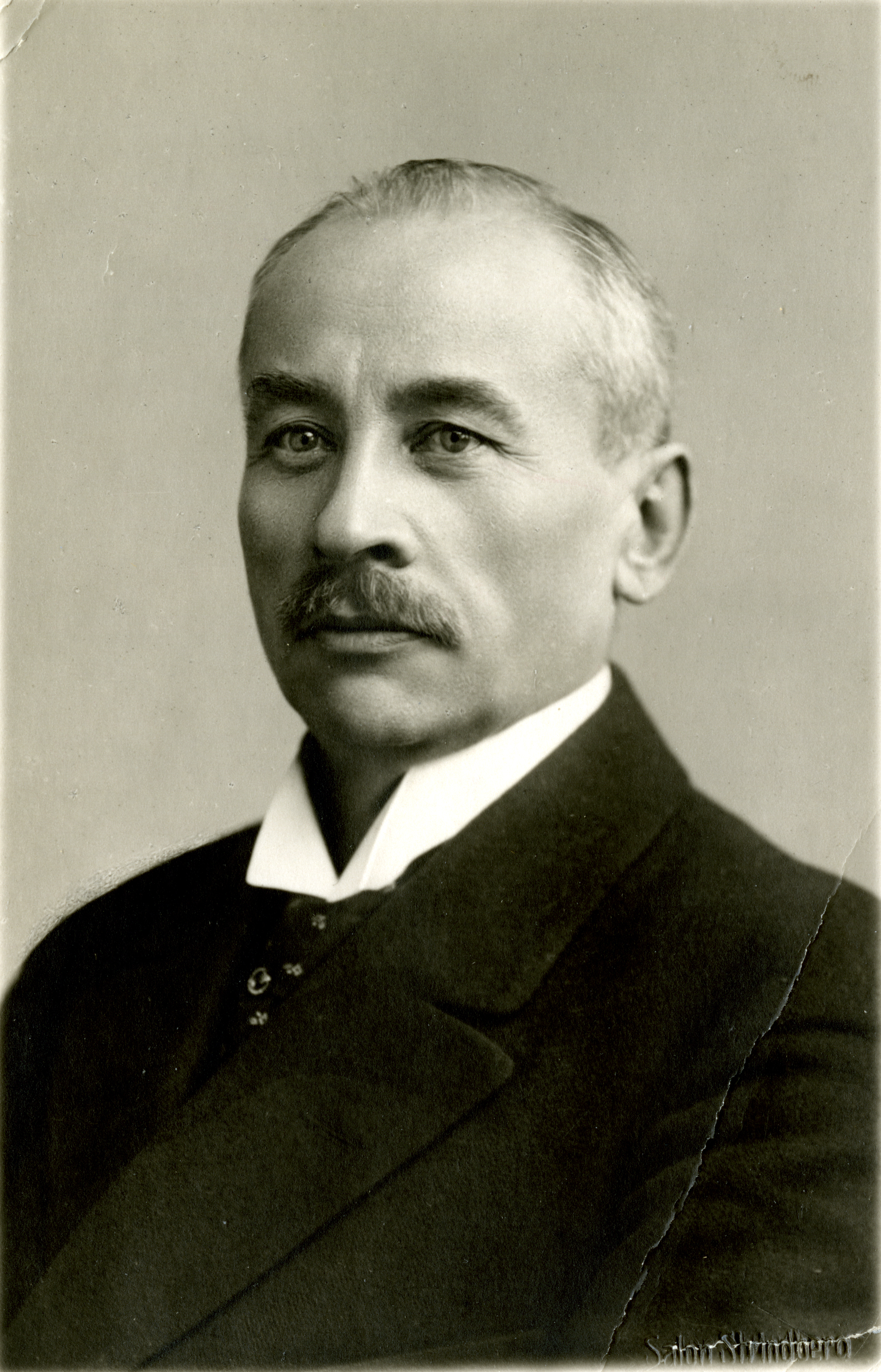
Merikanto (c. 1920)

Oskar Merikanto (pronounced [ˈoskɑr ˈmeriˌkɑnto]; born Frans Oskar Ala-Kanto; 5 August 1868 – 17 February 1924) was a Finnish composer, music critic, pianist, and organist.

As a composer, Merikanto was primarily a miniaturist, and his extensive œuvre includes songs and piano pieces (he wrote over 100 of each). Of the latter, he is best remembered for: Summer Evening Waltz (Kesäillan valssi, Op. 1), Romance (Romanssi, Op. 12), Summer Evening Idyll (Kesäillan idylli, Op. 16/2), Valse lente (Op. 33), and Idyll (Idylli, Op. 73/1). Merikanto also wrote three operas: The Maiden of the North (Pohjan neiti, 1898), which retains a degree of historical significance as the first opera composed to a Finnish libretto; The Death of Elina (Elinan surma, 1910); and Regina von Emmeritz (1920). However, Merikanto's operas have entered neither the domestic nor the international repertoires.

As a music critic, Merikanto was associated with the Finnish-language, liberal, nationalist newspaper Päivälehti.

== Biography ==
He was born in Helsinki, the son of Frans Ferdinand Ala-Kanto (his surname is also reported as Aittomäki) from Jalasjärvi, South Ostrobothnia and Anna Helena Merikanto (née Tammelin). Frans got a Swedish-language surname, Mattsson, when he joined the Finnish army. His father had changed the family name from Ala-Kanto to Merikanto in 1882. Meri means "sea" and refers to his voyage from Vaasa to Helsinki; Kanto refers to his origins from the estate Kanto.

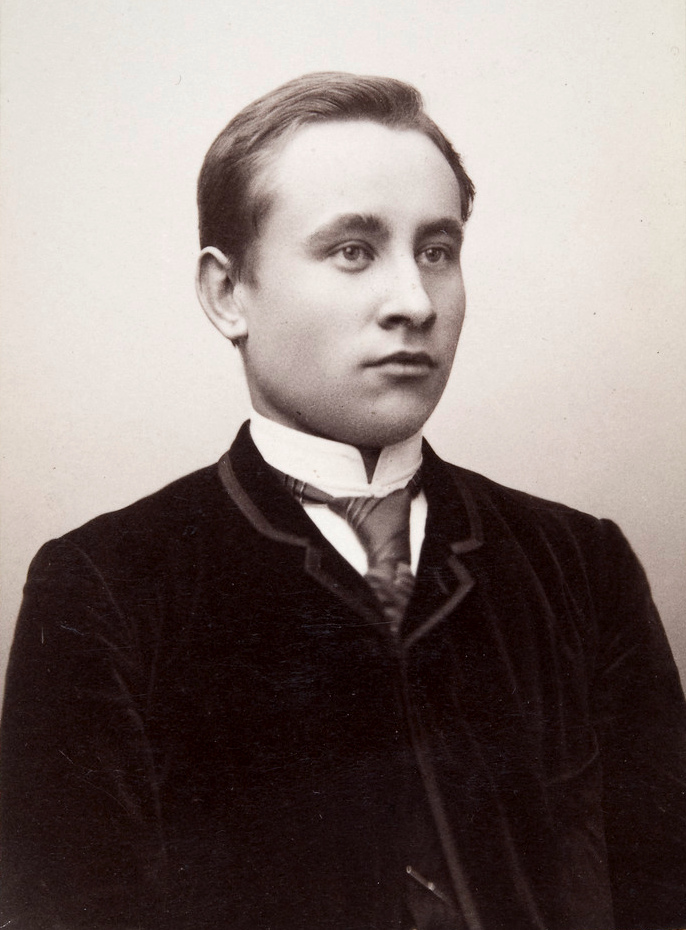
Young Merikanto

He studied for some time at the Leipzig Conservatory in Germany, where his teachers were Carl Reinecke, Theodor Coccius, Robert Papperitz, Willy Rechenberg and Gustav Schreck.

He was notable for his variety of talents – he gave concerts all around Finland, performing on the piano and organ, conducting orchestras, and composing original music. Some of his most beloved compositions are Där björkarna susa, the waltz Kesäilta (Summer Evening Waltz) and the Valse lente, Op. 33.

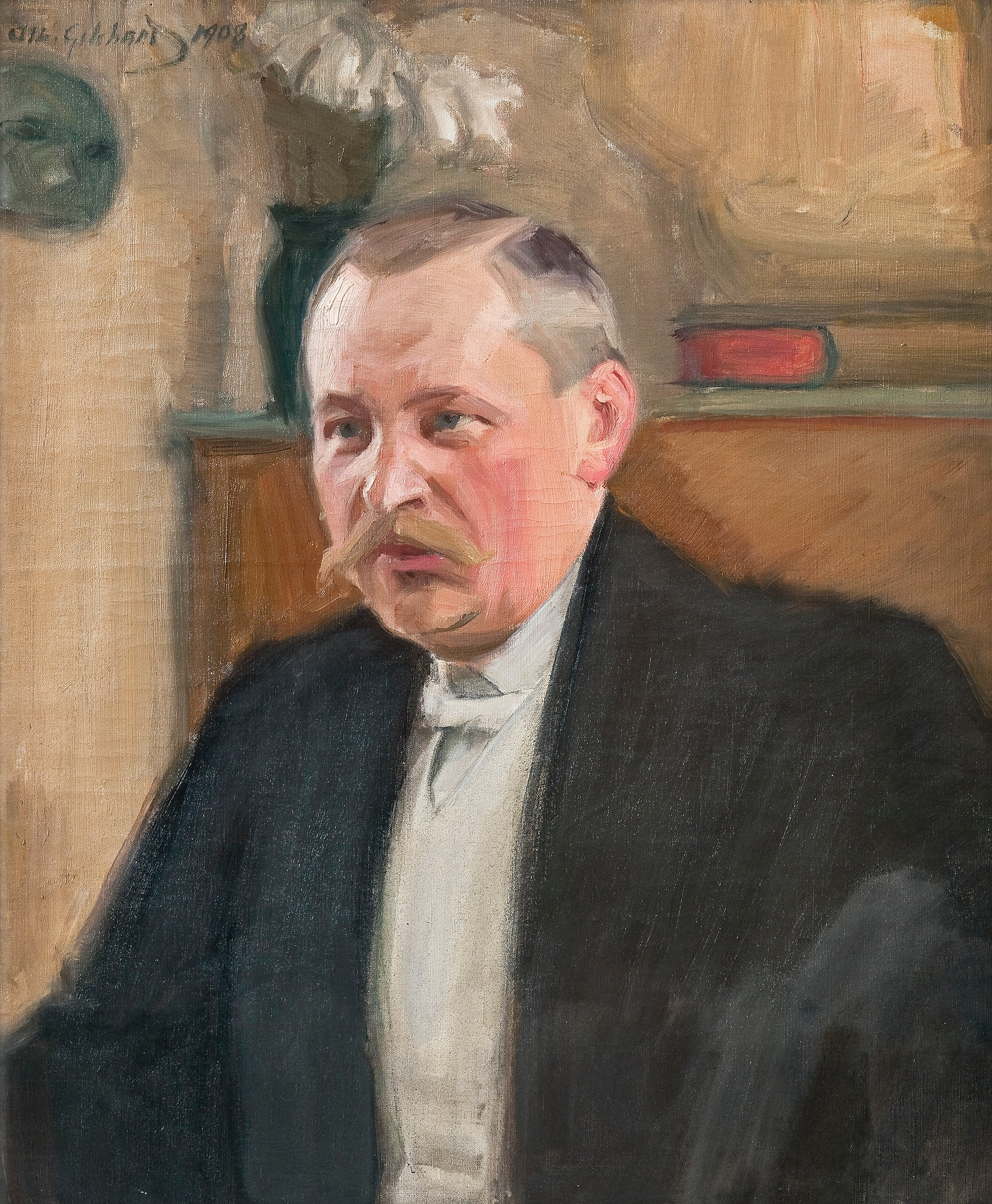
Portrait of Merikanto by Albert Gebhard in 1903

Merikanto's style is reminiscent of Finnish folk songs, but has its basis in Italian bel canto.

He died in Hausjärvi-Oitti.

=== Personal life ===
He married Elise "Liisa" Häyrynen in 1892. They had one son, Aarre Merikanto, a noted Finnish composer.

== Works ==
=== Piano ===
- Concert-Walzer OM 018
- Erinnerung OM 036
- Fantasia (Tuoll’ on mun kultani) OM 037 (piano four hands)
- Fest-Marsch OM 040
- Grande valse OM 044
- Hiljaa illan hämärässä (additional two Solo Voices)
- Hopeahääpäivän valjetessa OM 055
- Jesu, elon autuuteni I OM 071
- Jesu, elon autuuteni II Om 071
- Canon in A♭ major OM 081
- Canon in B♭ major (Canon in Oberquarte) OM 082
- Canon in E major (Canon in Unterquinte) OM 084
- Canon in E♭ major (Canon in Unterterz) OM 085
- Canon in E♭ major OM 086
- Canon in E♭ major OM 087
- Canon in F major OM 088
- Canon in G major OM 089
- Canon in G major OM 090
- Kaipaus OM 092
- Kangasalan tunnelmaa OM 095
- Karjalan jääkärien marssi OM 101
- Kirkkoaikana OM 114 (piano four hands)
- Kolja-vals OM 117
- Liebestraum OM 148
- Lied ohne Worte OM 149
- Maa, suuri ja avara I OM 156
- Maa, suuri ja avara II OM 156
- Me sinua, Jesu, ylistämme OM 159
- Molto Allegro Scherzando OM 174
- Parolan marssi OM 202
- Phantasiestück OM 204
- Pianokappale OM 205
- Porilaisten marssi OM 208
- Porin rykmentin marssi OM 209
- Rakas muisto
- Ruusu OM 226
- Scherzo
- Scherzo G-Duuri
- Serenade OM 233
- Syntymäpäivämarssi OM 262
- Syntymäpäiväpoloneesi OM 263
- Taivaasta ilosanoman OM 268
- Tapanien tanssi OM 272
- Tempo di Polonaise OM 274
- Toivo OM 277
- Trauermarsch OM 279
- Träumerei I OM 280
- Träumerei II OM 280
- Ukko Noak OM 293
- Valkoisen kaartin marssi OM 300
- Valse lente, Op. 33

Merikanto, Valse lente, Op. 33
Performed by Constantin Stephan

- Yksinään
- Yli Atlantin, Op. 28
- Romanssi, Op. 12
- Pohjan neiti (The Maiden of the North) (1898)
- Nälkämaan laulu (The Song of the Hungry) (1911)

=== Organ ===
- Choral mit Vorspiel und Zwischenspiel I OM 190
- Choral mit Vorspiel und Zwischenspiel II OM 190
- Choral mit Vorspiel und Zwischenspiel III OM 190
- Der doppelte Contrapunkt OM 019
- Fantasia cromatica OM 038
- Fantasia ja koraali OM 039
- Häähymni [Wedding Hymn] OM 057
- Iltalaulu [Abendlied] (arr.)
- Konserttifantasia OM 120
- Passacaglia, Op. 80
- Postludium I, Op. 88, No. 1
- Postludium II, Op. 88, No. 2
- Postludium III, Op. 88, No. 3
- Prelude A minor (arr.) (BWV 807, from Bach's English Suites)
- Prelude G minor (arr.) (BWV 808, ditto)
- Rukous OM 222
- Sarabande D minor (arr.) (BWV 812, from Bach's French Suites)
- Sarabande E minor (arr.) (BWV 810, from Bach's English Suites)
- Prelude and Fuge B-flat minor (BWV 891) (arr.)

=== Solo voice ===
- Pai, pai, paitaressu, Op. 2, No. 1
- Vanha mummo, Op. 2, No. 2
- Onneton, Op. 2, No. 3
- Die Sprache des Waldes [Metsän mieli], Op. 7, No. 1
- Stille Sicherheit [Äänettömässä rauhassa], Op. 7, No. 2
- Scheideblick, Op. 7, No. 3
- Ewige Treue, Op. 7, No. 4
- Kevätlinnuille etelässä, Op. 11, No. 1
- Muistellessa, Op. 11, No. 2
- Yöllä, Op. 11, No. 3a
- Se rakkaus, Op. 13, No. 4
- Tuulan tei, Op. 13, No. 5
- Hennan keinulaulu, Op. 14, No. 2
- Reppurin laulu, Op. 14, No. 10
- Kun saapuu Herra Zebaoth, Op. 17
- Hyljätty, Op. 18, No. 1
- Ilta tuntureilla, Op. 18, No. 2
- Haave, Op. 18, No. 3a
- Immen pelko, Op. 18, No. 4
- Se kolmas, Op. 19b
- Kullan murunen, Op. 20, No. 1
- Miksi laulan, Op. 20, No. 2
- Vertaus, Op. 20, No. 3a
- Kun päivä paistaa, Op. 24, No. 1
- Vallinkorvan laulu, Op. 24, No. 2
- Laulan lasta nukkumahan, Op. 30, No. 1
- Laula tyttö!, Op. 30, No. 2
- Tule!, Op. 30, No. 3
- Myrskylintu, Op. 30, No. 4
- Mä lykkään purteni laineillen, Op. 32, No. 1
- Kas, oksa värähtää, Op. 32, No. 2
- Hän kulkevi kuin yli kukkien, Op. 32, No. 3
- Kylän tiellä, Op. 32, No. 4
- Nyt ja sitten [Jetzt und einst], Op. 34, No. 1
- Vallflickan [Das Hirtenmädchen], Op. 34, No. 2
- Kyynel [Die Träne], Op. 34, No. 3
- Ainut hetki, Op. 36, No. 1
- Kottarainen, Op. 36, No. 2
- Soi vienosti murheeni soitto, Op. 36, No. 3
- An den Frühling, Op. 38, No. 1
- Ström' leise, Op. 38, No. 2
- Wehmut, Op. 38, No. 3
- Takt, Op. 38, No. 4
- Ilmattaren laulu, Op. 40, No. 1
- Rukous (Ave Maria), Op. 40, No. 2
- Töne der Waldtauben [Metsäkyyhkyset], Op. 47, No. 1
- Kuin hiipuva hiillos tummentuu, Op. 47, No. 2
- Aftonstämning, Op. 47, No. 3
- Merellä, Op. 47, No. 4a
- Merellä, Op. 47, No. 4b
- Tuonen tytön laulu, Op. 48, No. 1
- Tuuti lulla mun kuopustain, Op. 48, No. 2
- Kun vaan laulaa saan, Op. 49, No. 1
- Kuolema kannelta löi, Op. 49, No. 2
- Jos olet mun!, Op. 49, No. 3
- Vackra flicka, gift dig snart [Etsi sulho, neitonen], Op. 51, No. 1
- Annina, Op. 51, No. 2
- De gledo på kanalen [Kuun koittaessa], Op. 51, No. 3
- Taas soivat ne suuret surut, Op. 52, No. 1
- Linnulle kirkkomaalla, Op. 52, No. 2
- Oi, muistatko vielä sen virren, Op. 52, No. 3
- Itkevä huilu, Op. 52, No. 4
- Omenankukat, Op. 53, No. 1
- Oi, minne emon lintunen lensi?, Op. 53, No. 2
- Kun nukahdan katsoen tähtiin ma, Op. 54
- Illan kuutamossa, Op. 58, No. 1
- Lapselle, Op. 58, No. 2
- Yksin, Op. 58, No. 3
- Kevätlaulu, Op. 58, No. 4
- Elämän laulu, Op. 61
- Tuuti, mun vauvani, nukkukaa!, Op. 67, No. 1
- Tipu, tipu, kuuleppas!, Op. 67, No. 2
- Paimentyttö, Op. 67, No. 3
- Matka maailman loppuun, Op. 67, No. 4
- Ilialin laulu, Op. 69, No. 1
- Illansuussa, Op. 69, No. 2
- Nuoruuden ylistys, Op. 69, No. 3
- Balladi, Op. 69, No. 4
- Ma elän!, Op. 71, No. 1
- Talvikukkia, Op. 71, No. 2
- Valkeat ristit, Op. 74, No. 1
- Laulaja taivaan portilla, Op. 74, No. 2
- Käy kirkkomaata illoin vanhat mummot, Op. 74, No. 3
- Päivännousu kultaa kirkkomaan, Op. 74, No. 4
- Hyvää yötä, Op. 75, No. 1
- Lauantai-ilta, Op. 75, No. 2
- Tule kanssani, Op. 75, No. 3
- Laula, laula, lapsonen, Op. 78, No. 1
- Mä haaveksin näin, Op. 78, No. 2
- Surun voima, Op. 78, No. 3
- Sinulle, Op. 81, No. 1
- Rote Blumen [Punakukat], Op. 81, No. 2
- Niin sinua katsoin, neiti, Op. 81, No. 3
- Gamla Maja, Op. 81, No. 4
- Yö, Op. 82, No. 1
- Aamulaulu, Op. 82, No. 2
- Lastentaru takkavalkealla, Op. 82, No. 3
- Enten - Eller, Op. 82, No. 4
- Laatokka, Op. 83, No. 1
- Tule tuskaani yö, Op. 83, No. 2
- Päivä, Op. 83, No. 3
- Vi ses igen!, Op. 83, No. 4
- Teitä siunaan, Op. 84, No. 1
- Vågorna vagga min hvita båt [Aaltoset tuutivat venhoain], Op. 84, No. 2
- Öiset tiuvut, Op. 87, No. 1
- Suvi-illan vieno tuuli, Op. 87, No. 2
- Hyvästi!, Op. 87, No. 3
- Kansanlaulu, Op. 90, No. 1
- En skymningsvisa, Op. 90, No. 2
- Suvi-ilta, Op. 91, No. 1
- Sommarmorgon i skogen, Op. 91, No. 2
- Visa i väntan, Op. 91, No. 3
- Kasakan kehtolaulu, Op. 91, No. 4
- Agneta, Op. 93, No. 1
- Genezaretin rannalla, Op. 93, No. 2
- Bedövning [Raukeus], Op. 93, No. 3
- Elämälle, Op. 93, No. 4
- Hämärissä, Op. 96, No. 1
- Vågen, Op. 96, No. 2
- Min älskade, Op. 96, No. 3
- Äitini silmät, Op. 99
- Polska, Op. 103, No. 1
- Fågelungarna flögo ur bo, Op. 103, No. 2
- Bacchanal, Op. 105, No. 1
- Mot segern, Op. 105, No. 2
- Allting glider mot döden [Kaikki liukuu kohti kuolemaa], Op. 105, No. 3
- Iltakellot, Op. 106, No. 1
- Sinipiiat, Op. 106, No. 2
- Minä laulan sun iltasi tähtihin, Op. 106, No. 3
- Laulelen pojalleni pikkuiselle, Op. 107, No. 1
- Maid, wo ist deiner Augen Glanz, Op. 107, No. 2
- Ainoa maan päällä, Op. 107, No. 3
- Frisch gesungen!, Op. 108, No. 1
- Mutter, Op. 108, No. 2
- Hab' Sonne!, Op. 108, No. 3
- Beherzigung [Kun sulle taakaks' elo käy], Op. 109, No. 1
- Käsittämätön Jumala, Op. 109, No. 2
- Kummaa on mielestäin, Op. 109, No. 3
- Yö, Op. 110, No. 1
- Syyslaulu, Op. 110, No. 2
- Mummo, Op. 110, No. 3
- Aurinko laski, Op. 113, No. 1
- Mistä – mihin?, Op. 113, No. 2
- Huolissaan huokaileva OM 056
- Ihmis-elo OM 061
- Im Waldgeheg’ OM 063
- Kiitävi aatos kaipuun siivin OM 112
- Kom! OM 118
- Koskenlaskijan laulu OM 121
- Kotiranta OM 122
- Lemmen laulu OM 145
- Liebesfeier OM 147
- Maammopa valvoi marjuttansa OM 157
- Marjatan kehtolaulu OM 158
- Nocturne OM 180
- O pauvre mère malheureuse OM 188
- Oh Phantasie, du süßes Träumen! OM 189
- Romanssi ilman sanoja OM 221 (voice and lute)
- Släktvisan OM 240
- Vad fattas mig än? OM 298
- Viihdy täällä impi kukka OM 313
- Voi äiti parka ja raukka OM 319

Sheet music collection of songs

== Sheet music ==
- Piano Pieces 1: Suomalaisia Kansanlauluja [Finnish Folk Songs], Book 1
- Piano Pieces 4: Suomalaisia Kansanlauluja, Book 4
- Piano Pieces 5: Suomalaisia Kansanlauluja, Book 5

== See also ==
- Golden Age of Finnish Art
