= Mally Burjam-Borga =

Finnish opera singer (1874–1919)

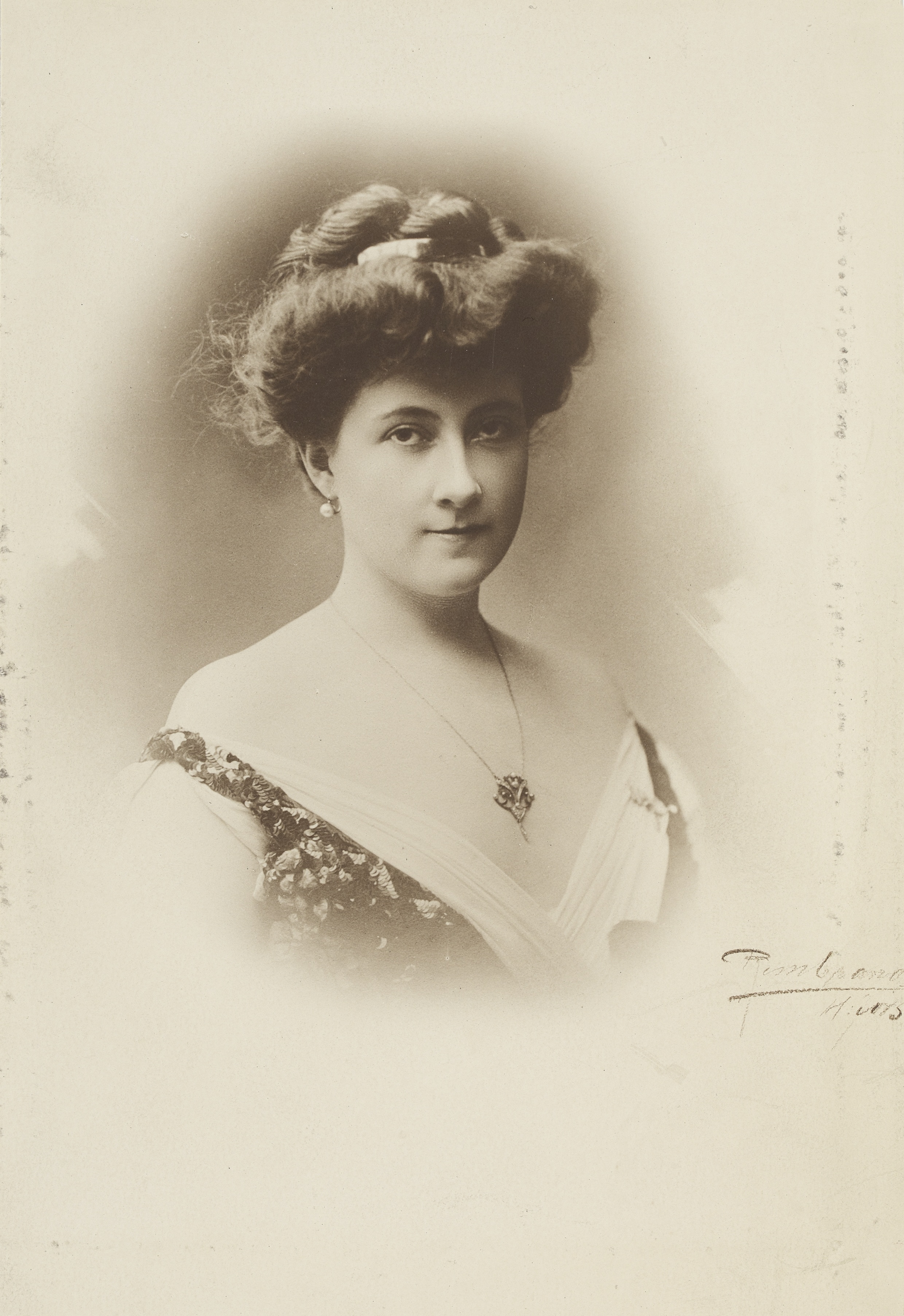
- Born: Amalia Henrietta Burjam; May 17, 1874; Vyborg, Grand Duchy of Finland
- Died: May 16, 1919 (aged 44); Vyborg, Finland
- Occupation: Opera singer (Mezzo-soprano)

Amalia Henrietta "Mally" Burjam-Borga (born in Vyborg, May 17, 1874 – died in Vyborg, May 16, 1919) was a Finnish opera singer, known for her mezzo-soprano roles.

== Biography ==
Mally Burjam-Borga was born in Vyborg (now Russia), Grand Duchy of Finland, on May 17, 1874. She was the daughter of Wilhelm Johan Burjam and Ludovica Adelaide Eugenie Waeytens, and the granddaughter of opera director Johann Burjam (1804–1879). Burjam-Borga was of German descent.

== Career ==
Initially, Mally Burjam-Borga studied singing in Finland, and later received instruction from the renowned German soprano Lilli Lehmann. Starting in 1905, Mally Burjam-Borga performed at the Théâtre national de l'Opéra-Comique in Paris, also known as Salle Favart, and also appeared in operas in Monte Carlo and Nice. Besides Finland, she held her own concerts in Germany and Austria, with performances in cities such as Berlin, Munich, and Wiesbaden.

Mally Burjam-Borga was particularly renowned for her numerous roles in Wagner operas, often playing the role of Fricka in Der Ring des Nibelungen. She also portrayed Laura in La Gioconda and Maddalena in Verdi's Rigoletto.

== Literature ==
Hillila, R.E., Hong, B.B., Historical Dictionary of the Music and Musicians of Finland. Greenwood Press: Westport-London. ISBN 0-313-27728-1, 1997. Kutsch, K.J. & Riemens, L., Großes Sängerlexikon, Volume 4, p. 511. De Gruyter, ISBN 978-359-81159-8-1, 2004.
