= Koivuranta =

Koivuranta is a Finnish surname. Notable people with the surname include:

- Ulla Koivuranta (born 1959), Finnish actress
- Marko Koivuranta (born 1978), Finnish footballer
- Tarmo Koivuranta (born 1980), Finnish footballer
- Anssi Koivuranta (born 1988), Finnish ski jumper
