= Alvajärvi =

Alvajärvi may refer to:

- Alvajärvi (Jyväskylä), lake in Jyväskylä, Finland
- Alvajärvi (Pihtipudas), lake in Pihtipudas, Finland
