= Elämäjärvi =

Lake in Pihtipudas, Finland

- Location within Finland
- Coordinates: 63°28′N 25°44′E
- Lake type: Natural
- Catchment area: Kymijoki
- Basin countries: Finland
- Max. length: 2.57 miles (4.14 km)
- Max. width: 1.85 miles (2.98 km)
- Surface area: 10.33 km^{2} (3.99 mi^{2})
- Average depth: 1.99 m (6.5 ft)
- Max. depth: 4.1 m (13 ft)
- Water volume: 0.025 km^{3} (20,000 acre⋅ft)
- Shore length^{1}: 19.93 km (12.38 mi)
- Surface elevation: 123.6 m (406 ft)
- ^{1} Shore length is not a well-defined measure.

Elämäjärvi is a medium-sized lake of Finland. It is situated in Pihtipudas, in the area in Keski-Suomi. Lake's water flows through canal to Saanijärvi.

== See also ==
- List of lakes in Finland
