= Kolkku =

Lake in Finland

- Location within Finland
- Location: Pihtipudas and Viitasaari
- Coordinates: 63°17′13″N 26°03′25″E
- Catchment area: 27.39 km (17.02 mi)
- Basin countries: Finland
- Surface area: 9.0 km^{2} (3.5 sq mi)
- Max. depth: 7.4 m (24 ft)
- Water volume: 26,790,200 m^{3} (946,090,000 cu ft)
- Shore length^{1}: 27 km (17 mi)
- ^{1} Shore length is not a well-defined measure.

Kolkku is a lake located in Pihtipudas and Viitasaari in central Finland.

== Information ==
The surface area of the lake is 900 hectares, or 9 square kilometers. It is 9.4 kilometers long and 2.5 kilometers wide. The lake's Coast is clear and has an open lake, but it also has a couple of headlands. Kukasniemi is located at the northwest end and Peltoniemi in the middle. At the southeast end of the lake, the lake narrows to the end of the bay. Only two hills rise from the shores. On the eastern shore of the northern end of the lake you can see Mount Huhmavuori, which rises to a height of 35 meters, and on the western shore Kolkunmäki is just as high.

There are four islands in the lake. Peltosaari and Koivukanta are located close to each other in the middle of the lake and Rantalansaari in the northern part of the lake near the Länsiranta. Rantalansaari is narrow, but almost 200 meters long, so it is the largest island.

The lake has been created and the depth maps have been published. Its volume is 27 million cubic meters, or 0.027 cubic kilometers. The average depth of the lake is 3.0 meters and the maximum depth is 7.4 meters. The deepest point is located in the middle of the lake, in the middle of the depression that runs along the length of the lake. Another equally deep depression has been measured from the southeast end of the depression.

The length of the lake's shoreline is 27 kilometers and its shores are low forest land, which is swampy in many places. There is a field in Kolku. The settlement is scattered, with a few leisure settlements in between. The roads lead from the village roads that branch off from intersection 6570. The border between the municipalities of Viitasaari and Pihtiputaa crosses the lake so that half of it belongs to both municipalities.

== Catchment area ==
The lake is located in the Kymijoki catchment area (division code 14) in the Kolima area (14.47) in the Viitasaari route catchment area (14.47), from which the lake belongs to the Kolkunjoki catchment area (14.475). The water level of the lake is 155.1 meters above sea level. The lake is located at the top of the Viitasaari route, so its catchment area gets most of its water only from its own area. There are eight hectares of lakes or ponds in the Kolku catchment area, four of which flow directly or indirectly into the lake. They are Kukkanen (68 ha) and Välkytinlampi (1 ha), which both drain into the Neva or Kukaslahti in their own ditches. Otralampi (2 ha) and Saarilampi descend at the southern end of the lake. Huhmarlampi (3 ha) is still located in the marsh between Lake Huhmarvuori la, which is connected to the lake by shelters. Kolkku descends along Kolkunjoki from Kuorikoski 7.5 kilometers to Kolima.
