= Willy Larsen =

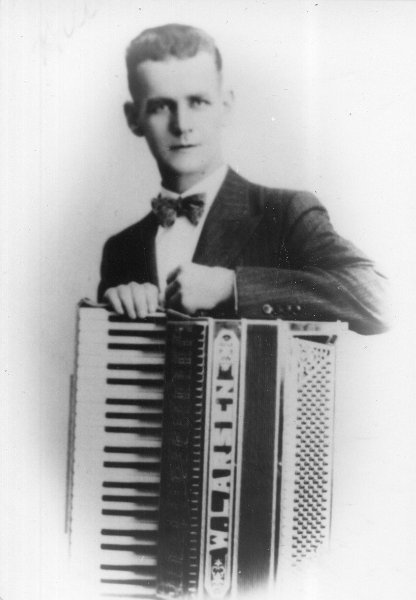
- Willy Larsen.

Background information
- Birth name: William Larsen
- Also known as: Willie Larsen, Willy Larsen
- Born: November 18, 1885; Kotka, Finland
- Died: March 10, 1935 (aged 49)
- Genres: Schlager music
- Occupation: Musician
- Instrument: Accordion
- Years active: 1920s and 1930s
- Labels: Columbia Records

William "Willy" Larsen (November 18, 1885 – March 10, 1935) was a Finnish American accordionist and director.

Larsen's ancestors came to Finland from Norway in the 17th-century, and he was born in Kotka. As a young man Larsen became a sailor and moved to the US before World War I. He settled down in New York City, where he performed at the Finnish American halls. Between 1920 and 1931, Larsen made 42 solo recordings for Columbia Records. He also made several recordings as accompanist for various artists, including Leo Kauppi and Hannes Saari.

== Discography ==
=== 1920 ===
- Apostol schottische (with Martti Söderlund)
- Elisabetin jänkä (with Martti Söderlund)
- Tyttöjen vienti

=== 1921 ===
- Suomen ent. kaartin marssi
- Kymmenen kynttä
- Lammen laine
- Merellä

=== 1925 ===
- Lyytin polkka
- Kaipuu
- Kerenski
- Surut pois

=== December 25, 1925 ===
- Heilani kanssa
- Yksin
- Taikayö
- Pohjalaispolkka

=== May 8, 1926 ===
- Rakkauden kaiho
- Syystunnelma
- Suomen polkkaa

=== August 4, 1926 ===
- Eveliina polkka
- Helmi
- Viimeinen valssi

=== April 21, 1927 ===
- Elämää juoksuhaudoissa (with Stanley Lutz)
- Syysruusuja (with Stanley Lutz)

=== May 17, 1927 ===
- Turun polkka (with Stanley Lutz)
- Maijani kanssa (with Stanley Lutz)

=== 1928 ===
- Elokuun kuutamo
- Muistoja synnyinlaaksosta
- Muistoja Pohjolasta

=== April 10, 1928 ===
- Jäähyvästi isänmaa
- Kultani kainalossa
- Kyllikki valssi
- Lukkari-Heikin polkka

=== February 17, 1930 ===
- Seurasaaren polkka
- Soittajan kohtalo
- Poikain vienti
- Muistoja Karpaateilta

=== 1931 ===
- Eveliina polkka
- Viipurin sottiisi
- Sydänsuru
- Lemmenkaipuu
