= Grandma from Pihtipudas =

Finnish journalism audience concept

In Finnish journalism and communication to large audiences, the grandma from Pihtipudas (Finnish: Pihtiputaan mummo) is a concept used to describe the average recipient of the communication. It is used to define the level of understandability of news stories and press releases: the message must be understandable even to less educated, elderly people living in the countryside. As people's education and media literacy increases, the level of understanding of the "grandma from Pihtipudas" is constantly re-evaluated as slightly greater.

== Background ==
The concept of the grandma from Pihtipudas is said to have been invented by journalist and journalism teacher at the University of Tampere Allan Liuhala. He is said to have taught his students in the early 1960s: "You must write so that even the grandma from Pihtipudas understands it."

The grandma from Pihtipudas is also referred to in connection with technological changes in communication or in other aspects of life. For example, during the move to digital television there was the question of how long analogical television should be kept in service along it "so that the grandma from Pihtipudas gets to see her television programs".

A concept similar to the grandma from Pihtipudas is also used in finalising the audio and video in records and other electronic communication, such as television and radio commercials. As well as top-quality professional equipment, an audio or video studio can have a "grandma TV", meaning a small old cathode-ray tube television or a "grandma radio", meaning a small travel radio, to see how the finished program looks or sounds like on technically primitive devices.

== Grandma from Pihtipudas in Pihtipudas ==
The concept of the grandma from Pihtipudas has inspired the Finnish municipality of Pihtipudas to elect the local grandma from Pihtipudas every three years since 1994.

Grandmas from Pihtipudas in order of time include:

- Kyllikki Varha
- Anneli Aaltonen
- Kirsti Pulkkinen
- Maija Tiainen
- Virpi Paananen
- Paula Kivinen
- Kaija Aikioniemi
- Aune Turunen

== See also ==
- Average Joe
- John Q. Public
