= Antti Kosola =

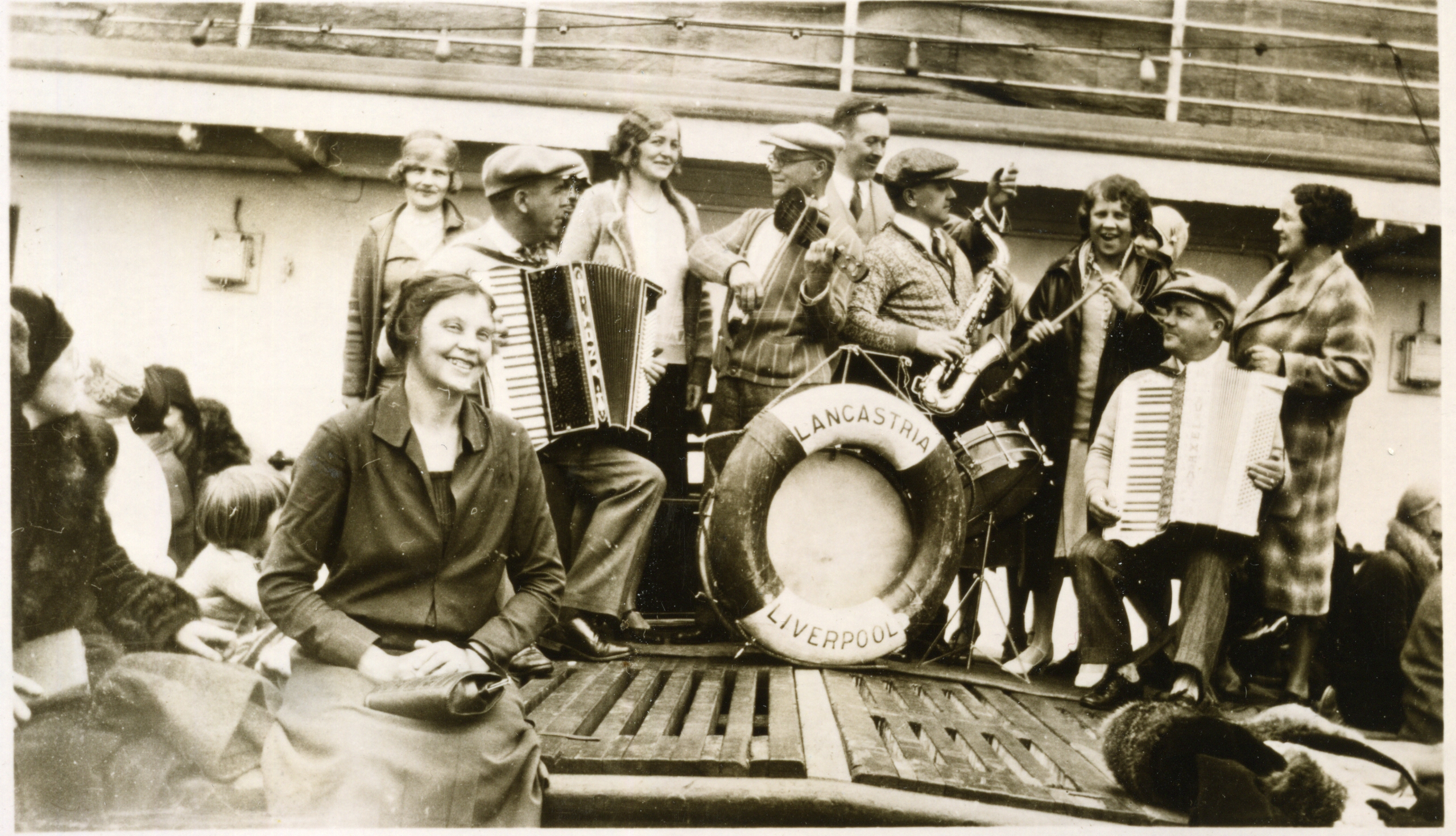
- On board the RMS Lancastria in 1929. From the left: Kosola, Ernest Paananen, Matti Jurva and Axel Leaf.

Background information
- Also known as: Antti Kosola, A. Kosola, Andy Kosola
- Born: Andrew William Kosola; March 4, 1896; Wisconsin, US
- Died: April 14, 1971 Lake Worth Beach, Florida
- Genres: Schlager music
- Occupation: Musician
- Instruments: Accordion, piano
- Years active: 1920s and 1930s
- Label: Columbia Records

Andrew "Antti" William Kosola (March 4, 1896 – April 14, 1971) was a Finnish American accordionist, pianist, bandleader and composer.

Born in Wisconsin, Kosola was in the 1920s and 1930s a very well-known musician on the Finnish American stages in New York City. He had his most successful years between 1926 and 1938, when he recorded about 50 pieces for Columbia Records and Victor Talking Machine Company. Some recordings were made with his orchestra and with several notable Finnish American singers, for example Leo Kauppi, Hiski Salomaa, Hannes Saari, Ernest Paananen and others. He also performed together with the famous Finnish American musicians Viola Turpeinen, Sylvia Polso and William Syrjälä. He also made recording sessions with Matti Jurva, Tatu Pekkarinen and Heikki Tuominen when they visited the US in the 1920s and 1930s. One of Kosola's most successful records was the waltz Meren aallot ("Waves of the sea"), which he composed and to which Leo Kauppi wrote the lyrics. The recording was made in December 1927 and sold over 30,000 copies in the US, Canada, and Finland. Kosola died in Lake Worth, Florida, in 1971.
