= Leo Kauppi =

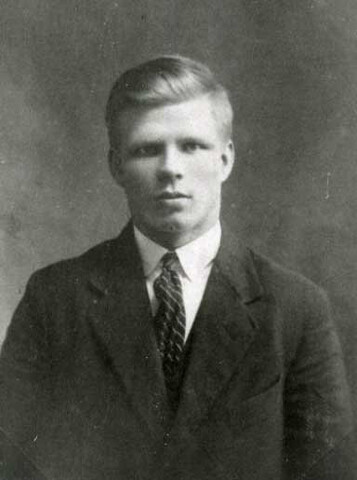

Background information
- Birth name: Leo Kauppinen
- Born: February 4, 1900; Kotka, Finland
- Died: 1938; Soviet Union
- Genres: Cuplé, schlager music
- Occupation(s): Singer, songwriter
- Instrument: Vocals
- Years active: 1920s and 1930s
- Labels: Columbia Records

Leo Kauppi, originally Kauppinen, (February 4, 1900 – 1938) was a Finnish American wrestler, singer and songwriter. He was the most popular Finnish American singer in the 1920s.

Kauppi was born in Kotka, where he and his brothers were well-known wrestlers. Initially Kauppi was not very interested in music, but used to perform at the local festivals in Kotka. He became a sailor and left his ship in a Canadian harbor in 1923. Later on he moved to Detroit and to New York City in 1924. He and his wife Hilda Nyman settled down in The Bronx and Kauppi started to perform at the Finnish American hall Työn Temppeli in Harlem.

In 1926 he started to make recordings for Columbia Records. Mostly he sang songs written by Tatu Pekkarinen and J. Alfred Tanner, but some of his songs were written by himself. His greatest success was the waltz Meren aallot, to which he had written the lyrics. The record was made in December 1927 and it sold 30,000 copies in the US, Canada, and Finland. It was Finland's best-selling record until Ture Ara's record Emma was released in 1929. Other of Kauppi's successful records were Maailman Matti, Kuuliaiset Kottilassa, Emma, Sjöman Andersson and Herra Petteri. Kauppi made his first four recordings with the Finnish born accordionist Willy Larsen, but the most part of his recordings were made with the Finnish American musician Antti Kosola and his orchestra. In total Kauppi recorded 40 songs between September 1926 and March 1931.

Kauppi's career ended because of the Great Depression in 1931. Along with about 6,000 Finnish Americans, he and his wife moved to Soviet Karelia. They settled down in Petrozavodsk, where Kauppi worked as a welder and continued singing for the local radio station. When Stalin's terror reached Karelia in 1937, thousands of Finns were arrested and executed. Kauppi was arrested in on May 30, 1937 and sent to a slave labor camp in the Soviet Union for 10 years. His destiny is unknown. Hilda Kauppi was arrested in September 1938 and was executed near Petrozavodsk.
