= Ernest Paananen =

- Born: December 26, 1879; Pihtipudas, Finland
- Died: January 12, 1951 (aged 71) New York City, New York, US
- Genres: Schlager music
- Occupation: Singer
- Instrument: Vocals
- Years active: 1920s and 1930s
- Labels: Columbia Records, Victor Records

Ernest Paananen (December 26, 1879 – January 12, 1951) was a Finnish American violinist, singer, and songwriter.

Paananen was born in Pihtipudas, and was married to the American musician Fanny Bay. His daughter, the actress and dancer Tuulikki Paananen, starred in several films. The family moved to the US in 1919. Paananen was mostly active as a violinist in Ohio, where he was a member of the Cleveland Orchestra for ten years. As a singer and violinist, Paananen made 17 recordings with Antti Kosola's orchestra in New York City between 1929 and 1930. His most notable record was Muistatko vielä illan sen, for which he wrote the lyrics. He died in New York City.
