= Alvajärvi (Pihtipudas) =

Lake in Finland

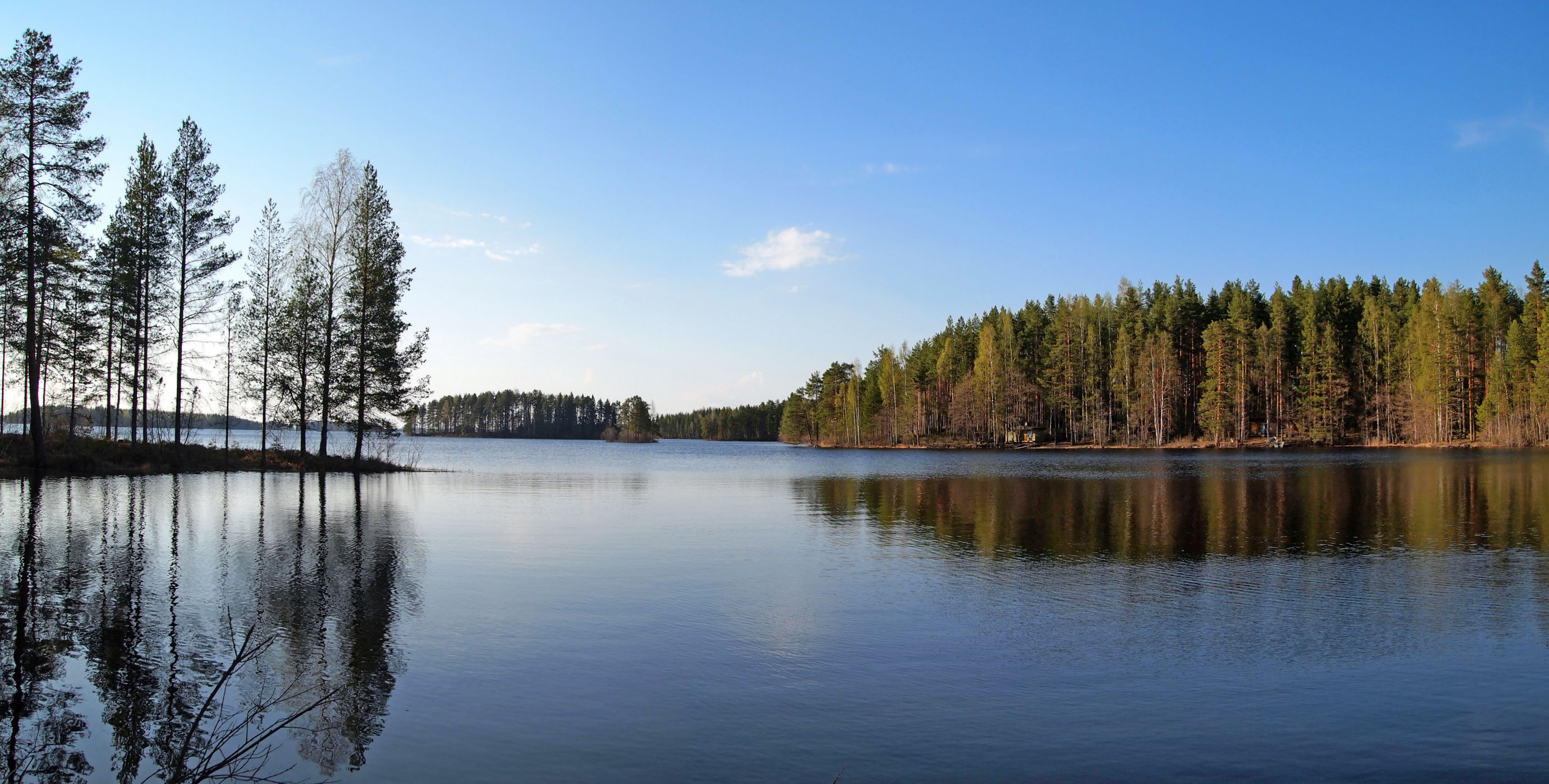
- Interactive map of Alvajärvi
- Location: Pihtipudas
- Coordinates: 63°23′00″N 25°28′00″E
- Basin countries: Finland
- Surface area: 45.63 km^{2} (17.62 sq mi)
- Surface elevation: 111.6 m (366 ft)

Alvajärvi is a lake located in Pihtipudas in Finland. Pihtipudas is a municipality of Finland. It is located in northern Central Finland along the highway 4 (E75), about 140 kilometres (90 mi) north of Jyväskylä

== Details ==
Lake Alvajärvi has an area of 45.63 square kilometers and an elevation of 111.6 meters3.

At the northern end of the lake is the village of Alvajärvi. On its eastern shore is the center of Pihtipudas, where the Heinäjoki River flows from Lake Alvajärvi to Lake Kolima.
