= Muurasjärvi =

- Location within Finland
- Coordinates: 63°30′N 25°21′E
- Type: Lake
- Primary outflows: Autiojoki
- Catchment area: Kymijoki
- Basin countries: Finland
- Surface area: 21 km^{2} (8.1 sq mi)
- Average depth: 8.98 m (29.5 ft)
- Max. depth: 35.31 m (115.8 ft)
- Water volume: 0.189 km^{3} (153,000 acre⋅ft)
- Shore length^{1}: 65.69 km (40.82 mi)
- Surface elevation: 112.2 m (368 ft)
- Frozen: December–April
- Islands: Hämeensaari, Arvonsaari
- ^{1} Shore length is not a well-defined measure.

Muurasjärvi is a medium-sized lake of Central Finland. It belongs to the Kymijoki main catchment area. It is located in the region Keski-Suomi in Pihtipudas municipality.

== See also ==
- List of lakes in Finland
