= Lake Kolima =

Lake in Finland

Kolima
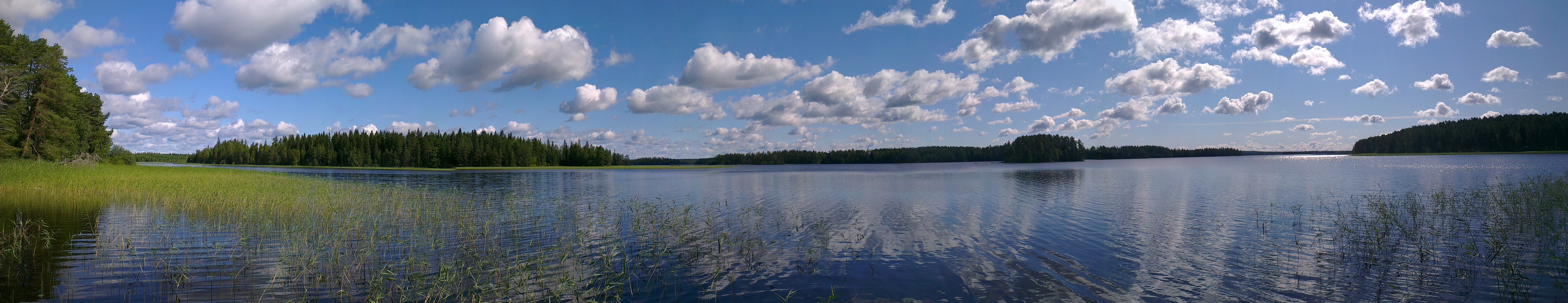
- Lake Kolima in summer

- Location within Finland
- Location: Central Finland
- Coordinates: 63°17′N 25°47′E
- Lake type: Natural
- Catchment area: Kymijoki
- Basin countries: Finland
- Max. length: 5 km (3.1 mi)
- Max. width: 30 km (19 mi)
- Surface area: 101.08 km^{2} (39.03 sq mi)
- Average depth: 8.61 m (28.2 ft)
- Max. depth: 66.31 m (217.6 ft)
- Water volume: 0.871 km^{3} (706,000 acre⋅ft)
- Shore length^{1}: 257.21 km (159.82 mi)
- Surface elevation: 111.2 m (365 ft)
- Islands: Haapasaari, Rakaja, Lopakko, Roikka, Korpisaari, Lylysaari
- Settlements: Pihtipudas, Viitasaari
- ^{1} Shore length is not a well-defined measure.

Kolima is a large lake in central Finland. It is an open lake with few islands and some ranges of rocks. Almost half of the lake is protected under the Natura 2000 program because of the lake's good natural and hydrological condition. The lake is suitable for canoeing and maps are available for water tourists. One route starts from Pihtipudas and goes southward to the Kärnänkoski rapids.
