= Marko Koivuranta =

Finnish footballer (1978–2026)

Personal information
- Date of birth: 10 March 1978
- Place of birth: Rovaniemi, Finland
- Date of death: May 2026 (aged 48)
- Height: 1.70 m (5 ft 7 in)
- Position: Defender

Senior career*
Years	Team	Apps	(Gls)
1995–1999	RoPS	33	(0)
2000–2003	FC Jazz	75	(1)
2004–2005	AC Oulu	49	(3)
2006–2008	FC YPA		
2009	RoPS	8	(0)
- * Club domestic league appearances and goals

Marko Koivuranta (10 March 1978 – May 2026) was a Finnish footballer who played as a defender for RoPS, FC Jazz, AC Oulu and FC YPA.

After the 2009 Veikkausliiga Koivuranta decided to retire his footballing career.

He also played 18 matches in Finnish national futsal team.

Koivuranta died in May 2026, at the age of 48.
