= Hannes Saari =

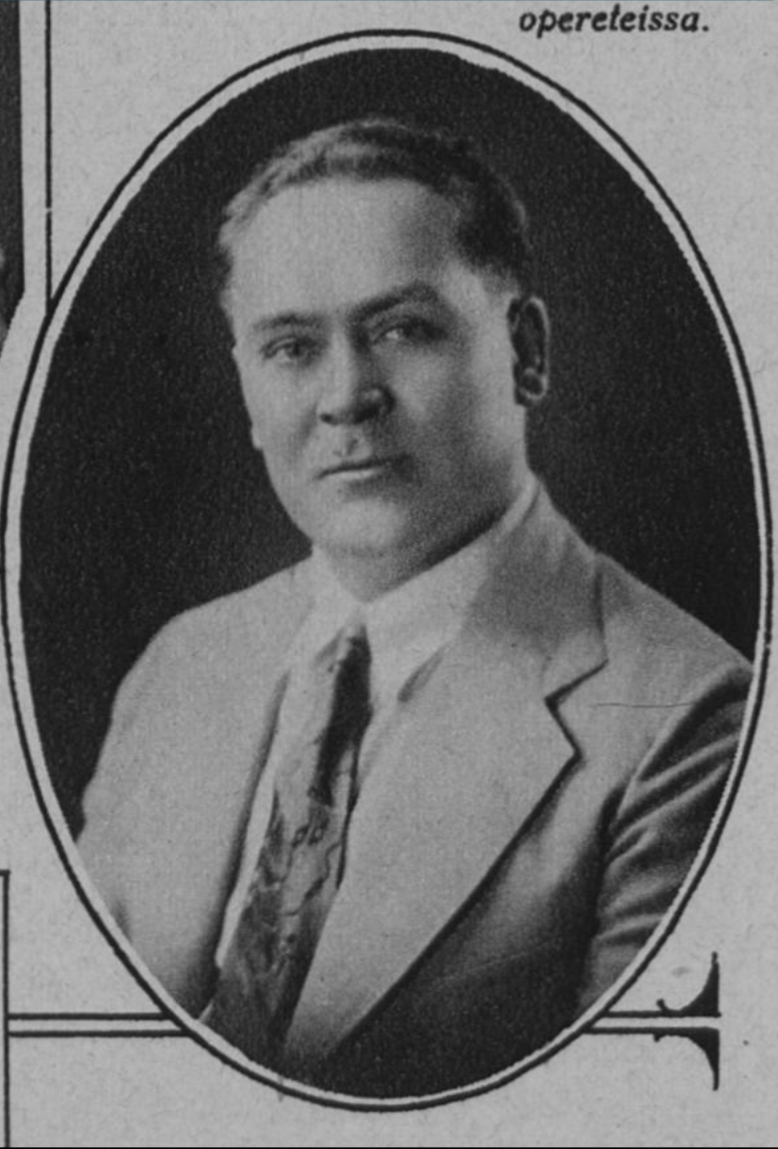

Background information
- Born: April 25, 1886; Oulu, Finland
- Died: July 13, 1967 (aged 81) Astoria, Oregon, US
- Genres: Cuplé, schlager music
- Occupations: Singer, songwriter
- Instrument: Vocals
- Years active: 1920s and 1930s
- Label: Columbia Records

Hannes Saari (April 25, 1886 – July 13, 1967) was a Finnish American singer, songwriter and choir director.

Saari was born in Oulu. His family moved to the US in 1902, but Hannes returned to Finland ten years later. He studied music at the Sibelius Academy in Helsinki from 1913 to 1914 and was then involved in mining in Butte, Montana, after which he moved to New York City, where he became a well-known choir director and singer. He and his choirs performed on radio and toured across the US and Canada. Occasionally Saari performed at Työn Temppeli, the socialist hall in New York. Saari thus became an important culture figure among the Finnish settlers and for the Finnish American labor movement. He died in Astoria, Oregon.

Between 1925 and 1931 Saari made 46 recordings for Columbia Records and Victor Records in New York. Some of them were made together with Antti Kosola and his orchestra. One of his most successful records was Armas, vanhaksi jo käyn (Darling, I'm already growing old). The original song is Hart Pease Danks' Silver Threads Among the Gold with the Finnish lyrics written by Saari. In 1963 Saari gave his private collection of recordings and letters to the University of Turku.
