= Tarmo Koivuranta =

Finnish footballer (born 1980)

Tarmo Koivuranta (born 15 April 1980, Kolari, Finland) is a Finnish footballer and plays for Finnish First Division club Jippo Joensuu. He plays as midfielder.

== Career ==
Koivuranta has made 79 appearances in the Veikkausliiga.
