= Pihtipudas =

- Municipality
- Pihtiputaan kunta Pihtipudas kommun
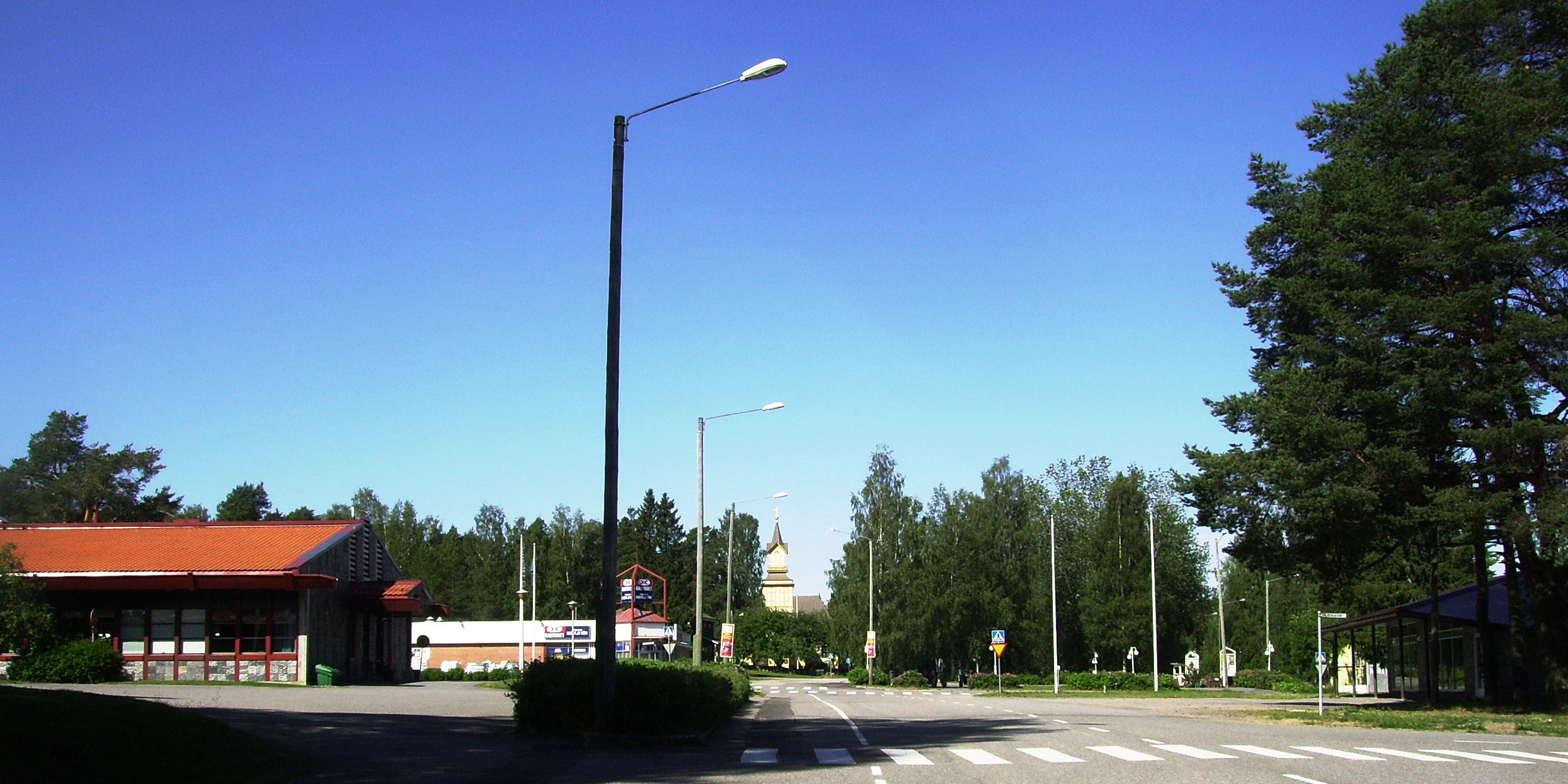

- Coat of arms

- Location of Pihtipudas in Finland
- Interactive map of Pihtipudas
- Coordinates: 63°22′N 025°34.5′E
- Country: Finland
- Region: Central Finland
- Sub-region: Saarijärvi–Viitasaari sub-region

Government
  - Municipal manager: Ari Kinnunen

Area (2018-01-01)
  - Total: 1,247.48 km^{2} (481.65 sq mi)
  - Land: 1,074.93 km^{2} (415.03 sq mi)
  - Water: 172.71 km^{2} (66.68 sq mi)
  - Rank: 72nd largest in Finland

Population (2025-12-31)
  - Total: 3,676
  - Rank: 197th largest in Finland
  - Density: 3.42/km^{2} (8.9/sq mi)

Population by native language
  - Finnish: 98% (official)
  - Others: 2%

Population by age
  - 0 to 14: 14.3%
  - 15 to 64: 53.1%
  - 65 or older: 32.6%
- Time zone: UTC+02:00 (EET)
  - Summer (DST): UTC+03:00 (EEST)
- Website: pihtipudas.fi

Pihtipudas is a municipality of Finland. Pihtipudas is known for the annual javelin carnival and for Lauri "Tahko" Pihkala, the inventor of Pesäpallo, the Finnish variant of baseball.

== Location and geography ==
Pihtipudas is the northernmost municipality of the administrative sub-region of Saarijärvi-Viitasaari in the region of Central Finland. It is located on highway 4 (E75), approximately 140 kilometres (90 mi) north of Jyväskylä, 200 kilometres (120 mi) south of Oulu and 412 kilometres (260 mi) north of the capital Helsinki. The municipality covers an area of 1,247.48 square kilometres (481.65 sq mi) of which 172.71 km^{2} (66.68 sq mi) is water. The neighbouring municipalities of Pihtipudas are Haapajärvi, Keitele, Kinnula, Pielavesi, Pyhäjärvi, Reisjärvi and Viitasaari. Just under half of the residents live in the largest settlement of Pihtipudas. The main villages within the municipality are located on the lakes of Alvajärvi, Elämäjärvi, Muurasjärvi, and Saani on the Saanijärvi, and at Ilosjoki, Korppinen, Kärväskylä, Peninki, Rönnynkylä, Kojola and Seläläntaus.

The landscape has the typical characteristics of the Finnish Lakeland geographical region, with extensive birch and pine forest cover, small granite bedrock extrusions and extensive bodies of water. There are approximately 140 lakes in Pihtipudas municipality. The two largest lakes are Alvajärvi and Muurasjärvi, and smaller lakes include Saanijärvi, Elämäjärvi, Kinturi and Liitonjärvi. The northern parts of two large lakes, Kolima and Kolkku, are also within the municipality.

== Demographics ==
The municipality has a population of 3,676 (31 December 2025), steadily declining from 5,818 in 1987. The population density is 3.42 inhabitants per square kilometre (8.9/sq mi). The municipality is 98.5% Finnish speaking.

== History ==
=== Prehistory ===
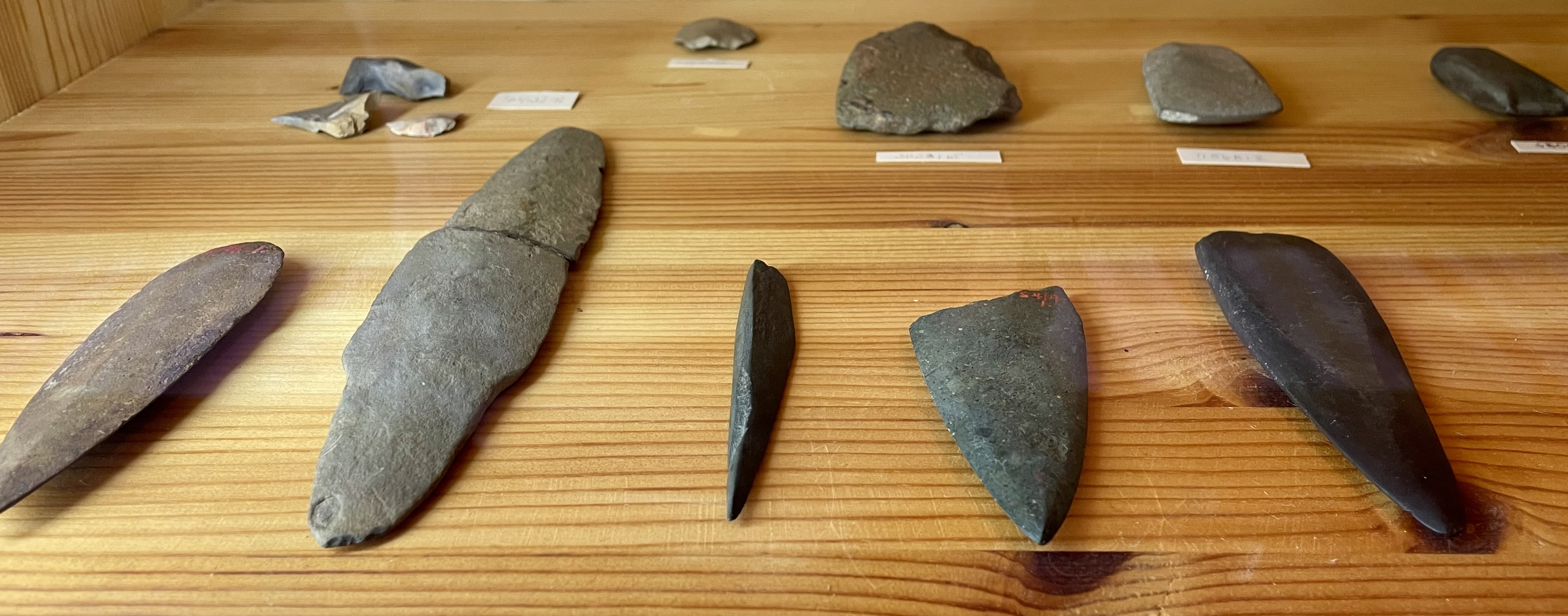
Prehistoric stone tools from Pihtipudas, Finland

The area has been inhabited since the prehistoric period, evidenced by a range of Stone Age sites in the municipality; the village of Muurasjärvi alone has multiple sites, such as the Keidas and Halmeniemi capes as well as the fields of Kivikko, Pitkänen, Männikkö, Viipylä, Metsälä, Koivukangas, Rimpisuo, Santaharju, Teini and Auhtola. Prehistoric artifacts recovered from the area include stone axes, awls, scrapers and other tools. The so-called 'Village of Rönni' at Rönnynkylä on the north-east shore of Saanijärvi has been dated to approximately 5,000 BC in the Mesolithic period and contained the bones of a small-sized dog, one of the earliest discovered in Finland. Fragments of a clay figurine characterized as Comb ware have also been retrieved from a Mesolithic site at Pihtipudas.

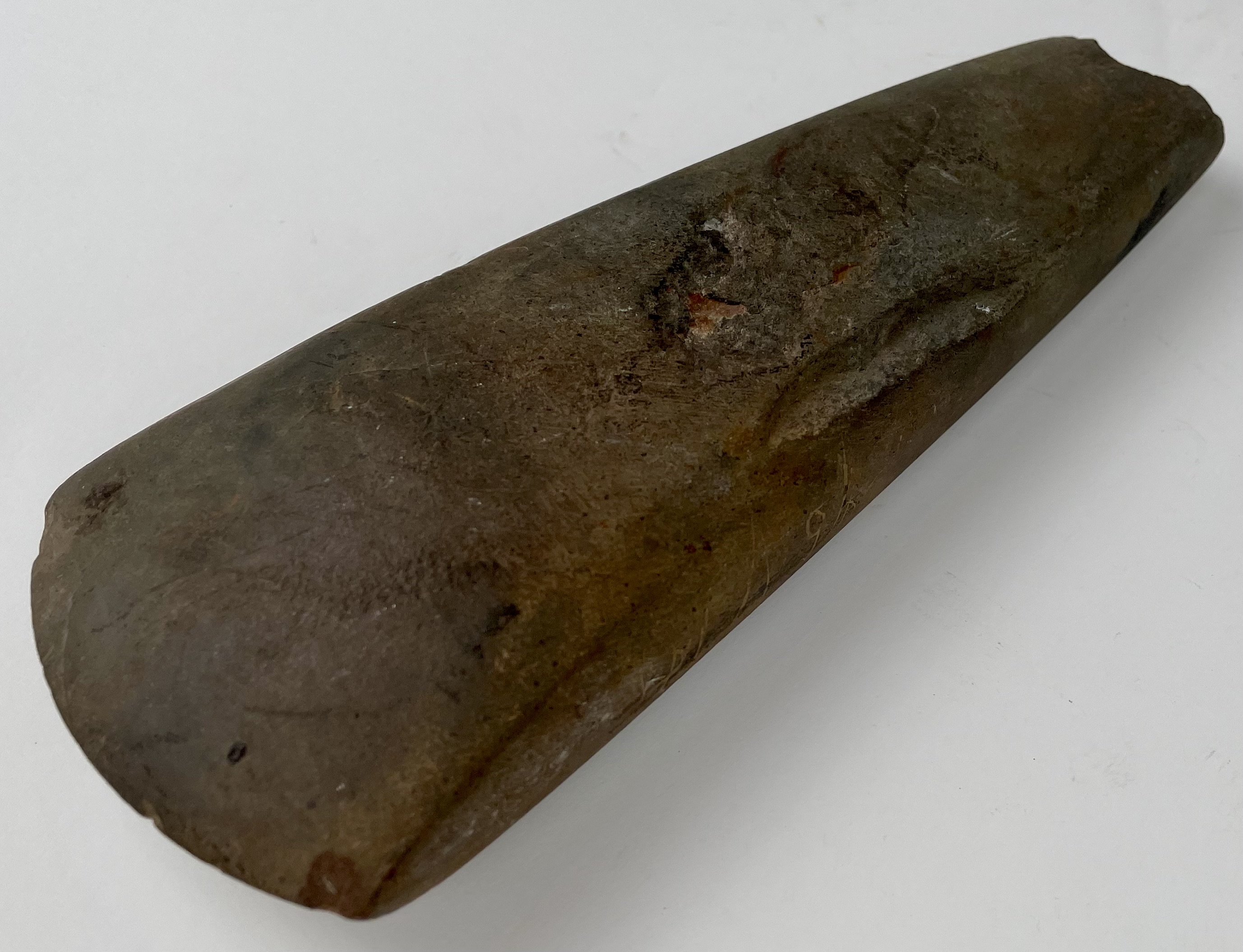
Neolithic stone axe head, found at Nokare, on display at Pihtipudas Museum, Finland

Archaeological evidence for Neolithic settlement in the area is rare, but palaeoecological data shows increasing signs of sporadic cultivation during the late Neolithic and the beginning of the Bronze Age between 2500 and 2100 BC, with pollen evidence for the first cultivation recovered from Pihtipudas, Keuruu, and Saarijärvi. Other evidence for human activity in the Neolithic period includes a zoomorphic stone mace, possibly carved with a fish or amphibian, believed to be associated with the arrival in Central Finland of cattle herding groups in the 3rd millennium BC. The prehistoric presence of the Sami people in the region are evidenced by two tampered cairns at Vaaksianniemi and Hämeensaari. These were excavated in the 1980s and 1990s and contained bronze sheets with high elements of tin, dating them to the Early Metal Period of Central Finland.

=== Post-prehistory ===
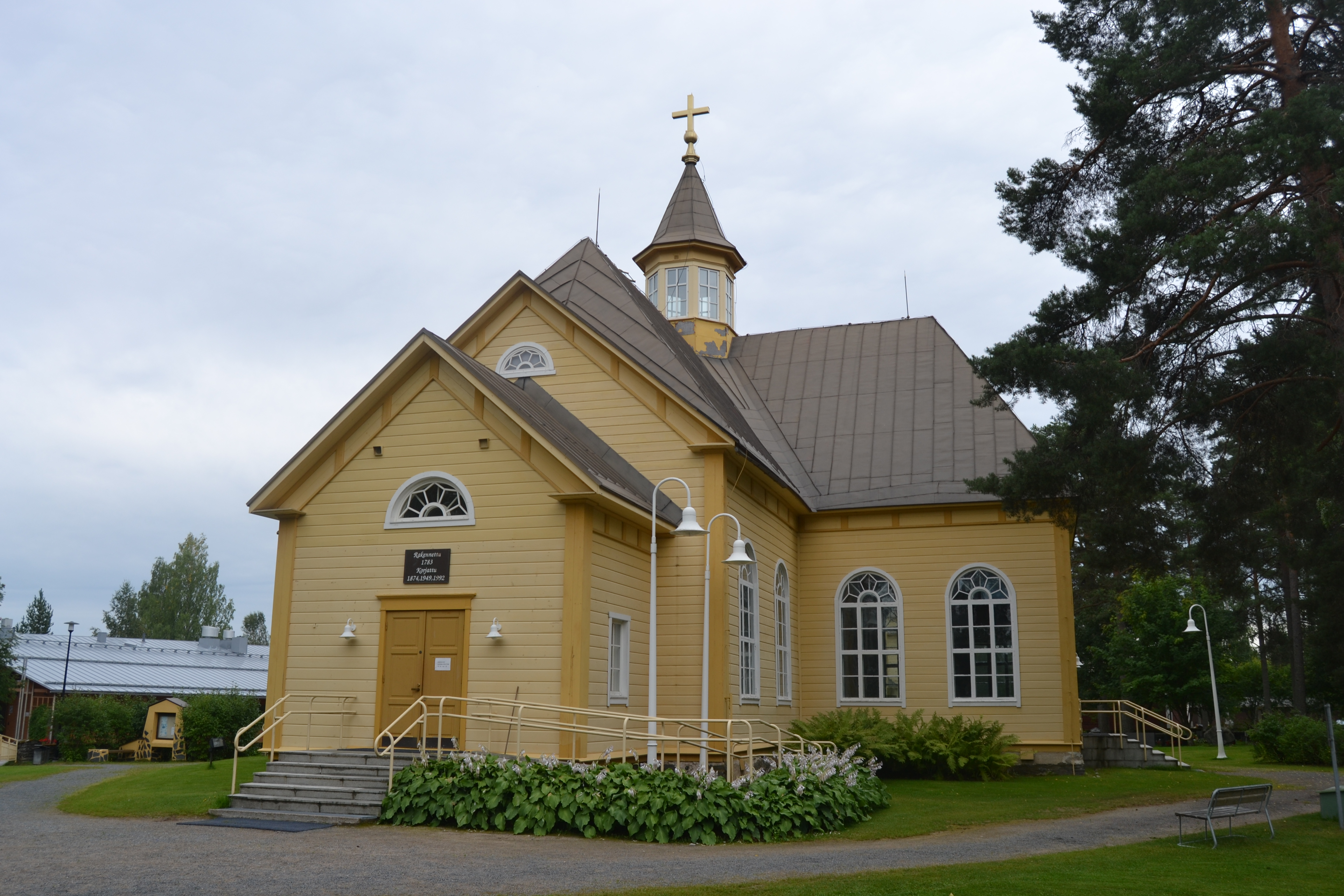
Pihtipudas church, Finland

The Pihtipudas region area was inhabited by Sámi peoples until the Middle Ages. The first known fixed settlement was established in the early 16th century with the first permanent residents of Pihtipudas, Pekka Varis and Pekka Rautaparta. The main industries were fishing and hunting, complemented by the development of grain and livestock farming.

The name of Pihtipudas was first mentioned in 1552 as pictipudhas [sic].

The church of Pihtipudas was completed in 1783 and built by the peasant church builder Simo Jylkkä. The belfry was completed in 1785. Pihtipudas was separated from the Viitasaari parish in 1863. The church was renovated in 1874, 1950 and 1991. The first public school in Pihtipudas was established in the village church in 1877. In 1917-18 there were 81 students. The first school in Muurasjärvi in the north of the municipality was opened in 1887. A Girl's National School was established in 1887.

By 1910 there were 286 tenant farms in the municipality and 128 small farms of less than 0.5 hectares. Only 2% of the area of the municipality’s 103,771 hectares were cultivated, with 94% forested. Two-thirds of the farmed land, comprising 1,400 hectares, were owned by self-employed farms. In the early 20th century there were 246 residents for every 100 hectares of arable land. In the late 1920s Lauri Tahko developed a sports field on land donated by the Läheaho estate near his summer cabin on Kolima lake in Hiekanpää, Ilosjoki. This field was used to train Olympic gold medalist Hannes Kolehmainen and to initiate the sport of Finnish baseball.

In the 1940s the municipality was subject to post-war re-settlement with the introduction of migrants from 62 northern parishes, predominantly in the villages of Muurasjärvi and Kärväskylä. These included evacuees from the agricultural area of Sortavala (now in Russia) and soldiers from Ostrobothnia. As a consequence of post-war re-settlement the population grew to 8,500. The memorial at the Military Cemetery adjacent to the church was unveiled in 1953 and sculpted by Ilmari Wirkkala. The cemetery contains the graves and memorials for approximately 60 Finnish soldiers, the majority killed in action during the Winter War of 1939-1940 and the subsequent Continuation War of 1940-1944.

On 7 March 1969 Pihtipudas was the location of a mass shooting, in which Tauno Pasanen, a smallholder, shot and killed four armed policemen. The incident was dramatized in the 1972 Finnish film Eight Deadly Shots, directed by Mikko Niskanen.

The annual Boot Foot Rock festival ('Saapasjalkarock' in Finnish) was held in Pihtipudas between 1976 and 1988 and finally in 2006. The event was held eleven times, attracting an annual audience of 14,000 people. Notable performers at the 1986 festival included Metallica and Fabulous Thunderbirds.

== Attractions ==
=== Pihtipudas Javelin Carnival ===
The annual Pihtipudas Javelin Carnival was started in 1971 by local athletes Leo Pusa and Jorma Kinnunen. Female participation started in 1974 and a javelin school was introduced in 1975. It also includes a paralympics event. This 4-day summer festival is now the largest javelin festival in Finland, attracting regional and international athletes, including British Olympic team member Laura Whittingham. The only javelin museum in Finland ('Keihäsmuseo' in Finnish) is located in the Putaanportti area of Pihtipudas.

=== Pihtipudas Local History Museum ===
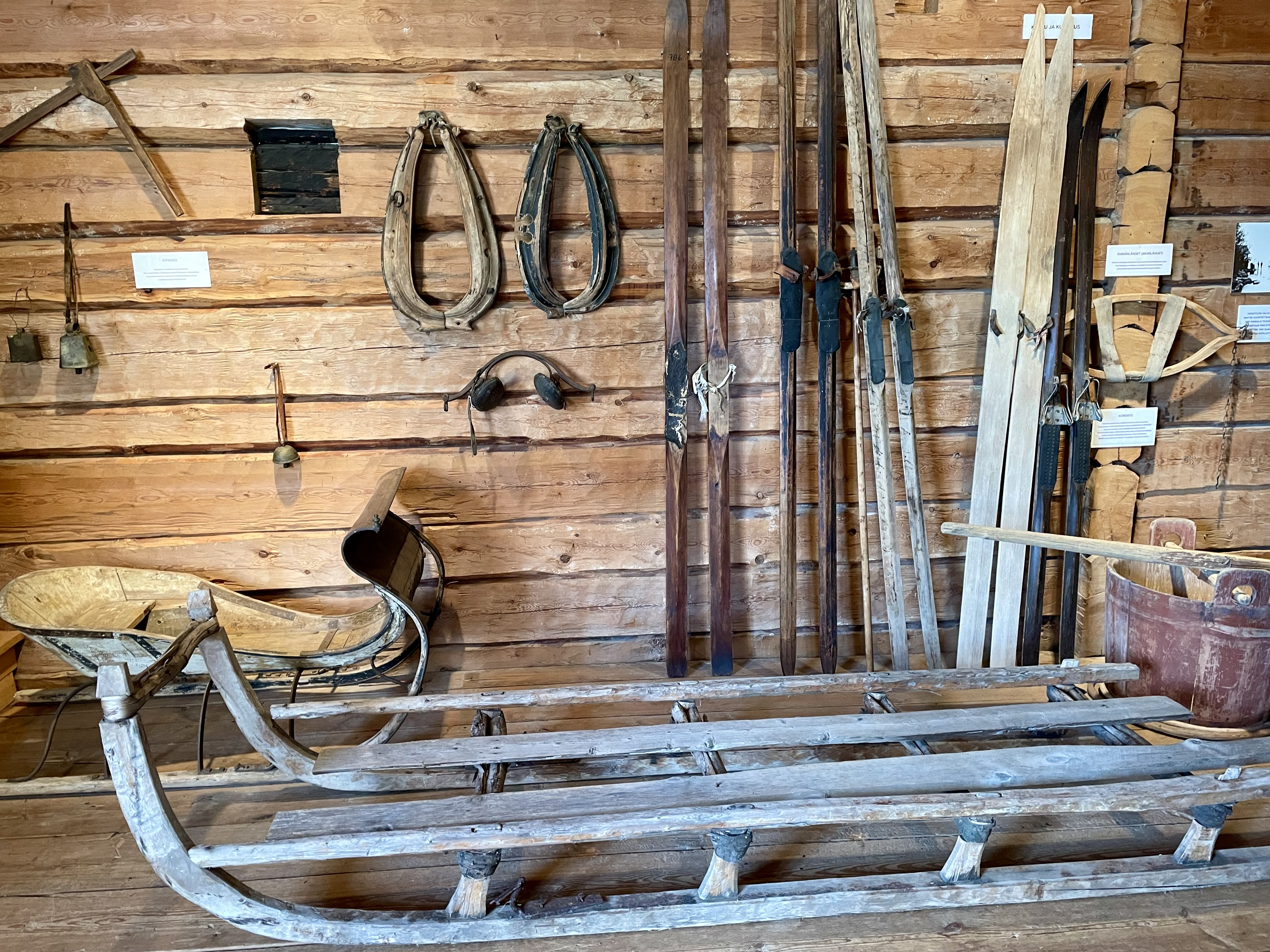
Traditional winter transportation, displayed at Pihtipudas Museum, Central Finland

The local museum is situated in a converted granary next to the church in the center of Pihtipudas. The granary was built in 1857 and was acquired as a museum in 1960. The original building had double walls and floors with a wide space between them to prevent the theft of grain by drilling holes in the exterior. The museum contains approximately 900 items, including examples of local prehistory, fishing, agriculture and artisan crafts in several wood-lined rooms on two floors.

It includes a small selection of prehistoric artifacts from the area, including stone axes and other tools believed to be from the Stone Age and pottery from later prehistory. The collection includes a Stone Age axe head from the Neolithic period found in a field at Nokare in 1942, donated to the museum by Matti Pekkarinen.

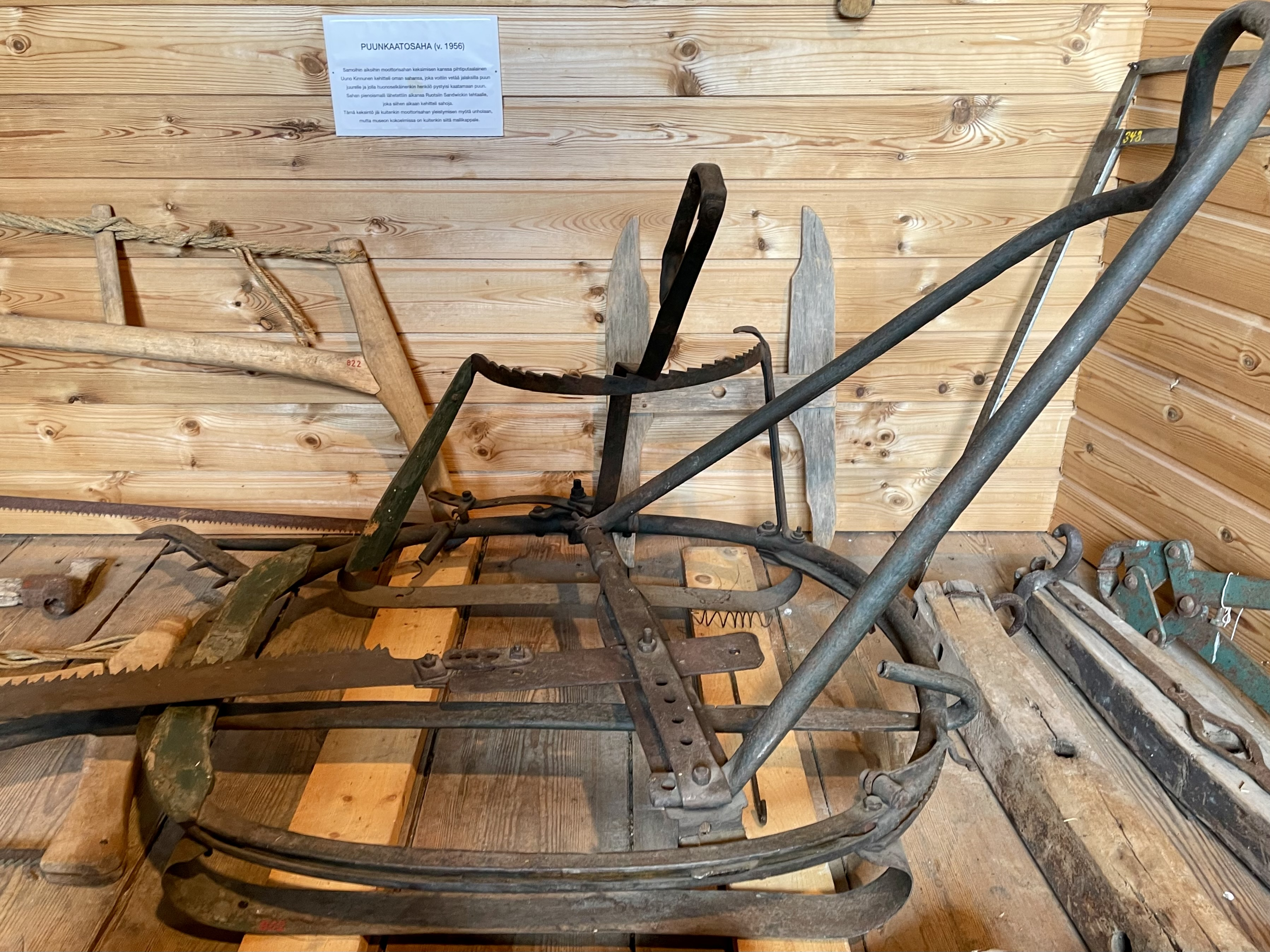
Mobile wood saw, Pihtipudas Museum, Finland

Other collections reflect the more recent traditional practices of the region, including fishing nets, boats, winter transportation and animal traps for bear and fox hunting. The museum also contains an example of a unique mobile wood saw ('Puunkaatosaha' in Finnish) used for cutting trees and transportable by ski. It was invented in Pihtipudas by Uuno Kinnunen and presented to the Sandwick factory in Sweden in the 1950s, but was made obsolete by developments in mechanized tree-felling.

=== Water recreation ===
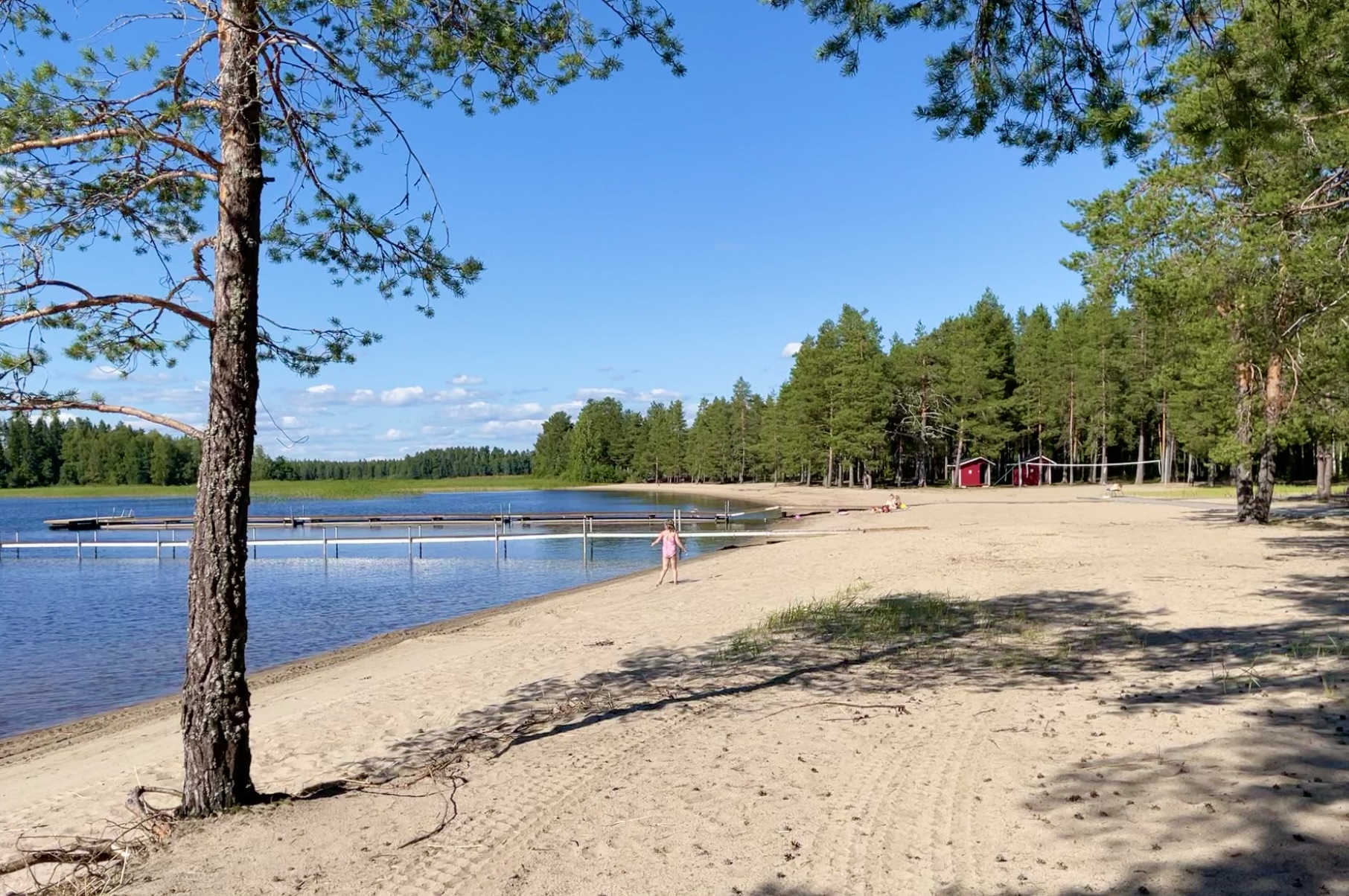
Hiekkaranta beach on the Alvajärvi at Pihtipudas, Finland.

Pihtipudas has two discrete lakeside recreation areas: the north-west end of Kolima lake and the south-east end of the Alvajärvi. They are connected by the Heinäjoki river, running immediately to the north of the village. The river is spanned by Heinäjoki Bridge, a two-span stone-vault bridge commissioned by the Board of Public Roads and Waterways in 1919 and completed by the company Granit in 1924.

There are nature trails at Rapeikko on the west shore of Kolima lake and near the bridge at Heinäjoki. The trail at Rapeikko includes a tar burning pit and leads past Sarvilampi beach to the meadow at Rapeikko farm. The trail at Heinäjoki has duckboard walkways and bird watching towers. The municipality maintains two official beaches, at Häikkä on the west shore of Kolima lake near Saparoniemen and at Hiekkaranta (meaning in Finnish: Sandy Beach) at the southern end of the Alvajärvi. Both have basic changing and toilet facilities. Other swimming and beach locations are located at Alvajärvi, Muurasjärvi, Elämäjärvi (Pening and Hassila beach), and at Kärväskylä beach at the north-east end of Kolima lake.

The extensive fishing grounds of Pihtipudas consists of lakes Kolimajärvi, Alvajärvi, Muurasjärvi, Saanijärvi and Elämäjärvi. Stocked catch species include freshwater salmon, whitefish, pike, perch and brown trout. Natural catch species are brown trout, pike and perch. All fishing in the area requires a fishing permit.

=== Rillankivi boundary stone ===
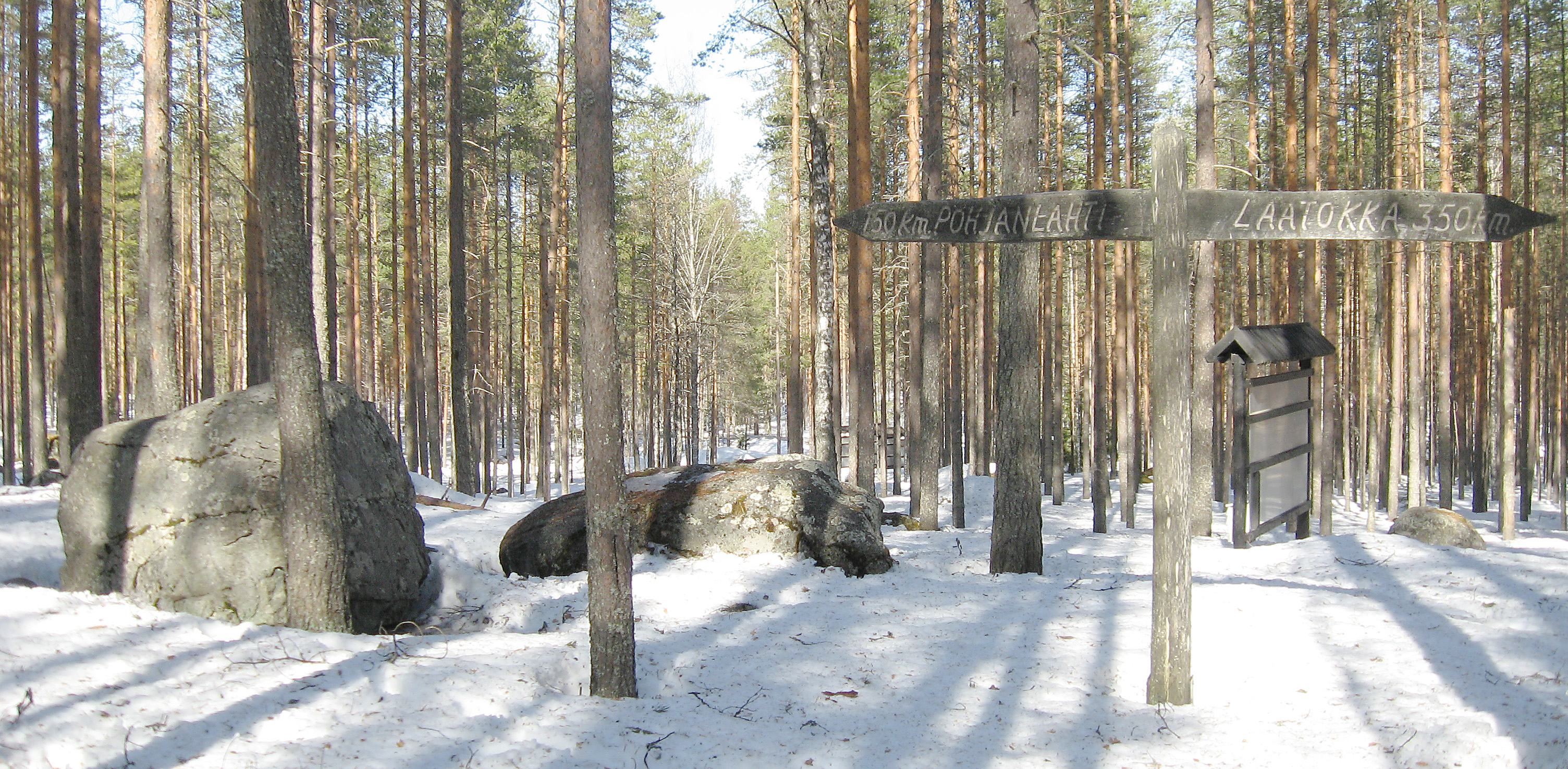
Medieval boundary stone at Rillankivi, near Pihtipudas.

Situated 30 kilometers to the north-east of Pihtipudas is the Rillankivi boundary stone, or Stone of Rilla. This glacial erratic is believed to be one of the stones marking the border of the Hazel Island Peace Treaty (Pähkinäsaaren Rauha) of 1323. This medieval boundary stone now marks the border between the municipalities of Pihtipudas, Pielavesi, and Pyhäjärvi. The site is protected by the Finnish Heritage Agency.

=== Imarrekivi stone ===
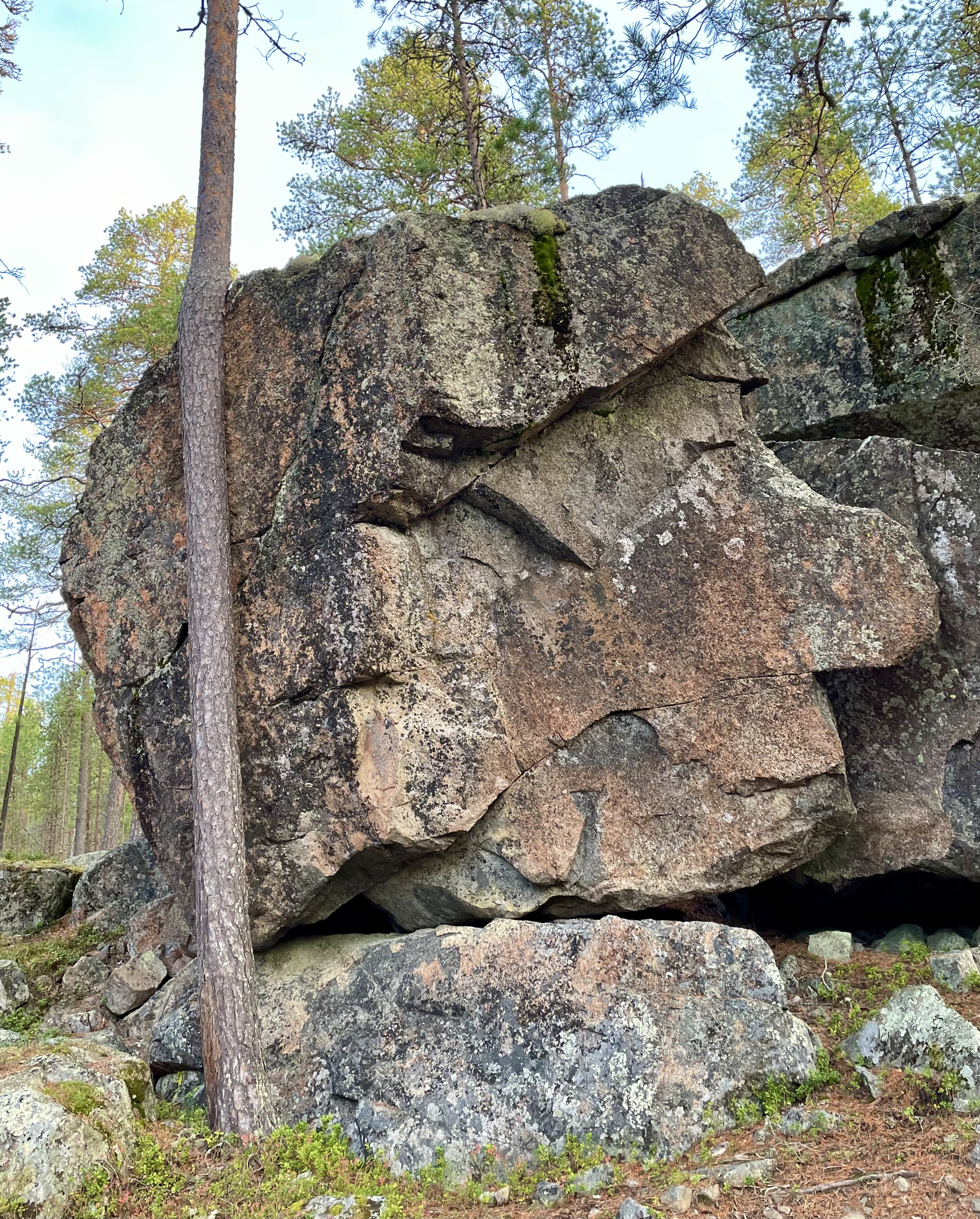
The Imarrekivi Stone, a glacial erratic near Pihtipudas, Finland

The Imarrekivi stone is a large glacial erratic located near Suurijärvi, south-west of Muurasjärvi, with one facet chipped to resemble a face. It is situated just off the Great Lakes hiking trail in the Harjuntakanen area. A local legend set in the 17th century tells how it was worshipped as a miracle-making place. On a Sunday night in the summer of 1600 Pekka Pekanpoika, a local Christian man from Muurasjärvi, went with his family to attempt to remove the face on the stone to discourage the heathen practice. Their attempts were halted when the 'Stone King of Imarrekivi' spoke with the words: "Before you were born, I was." Then the face in the stone became even clearer.

== Notable residents ==
- Lauri Ihalainen, trade union leader and politician; Finnish Minister of Labour, 2011 and 2015.
- Artturi Jämsén, Finnish politician.
- Jorma Kinnunen, javelin athlete.
- Ernest Paananen, Finnish-American violinist, singer, and songwriter.
- Lauri ”Tahko” Pihkala, inventor of pesäpallo, the Finnish variant of baseball.
- Paula Vesala, singer
- Pete Parkkonen, singer

== Twin towns ==
- Leirvík, Faroe Islands
- Borgarbyggð/Borgarnes, Iceland
- Ullensaker, Norway
- Dragsholm, Denmark
- Falkenberg, Sweden

== Gallery ==
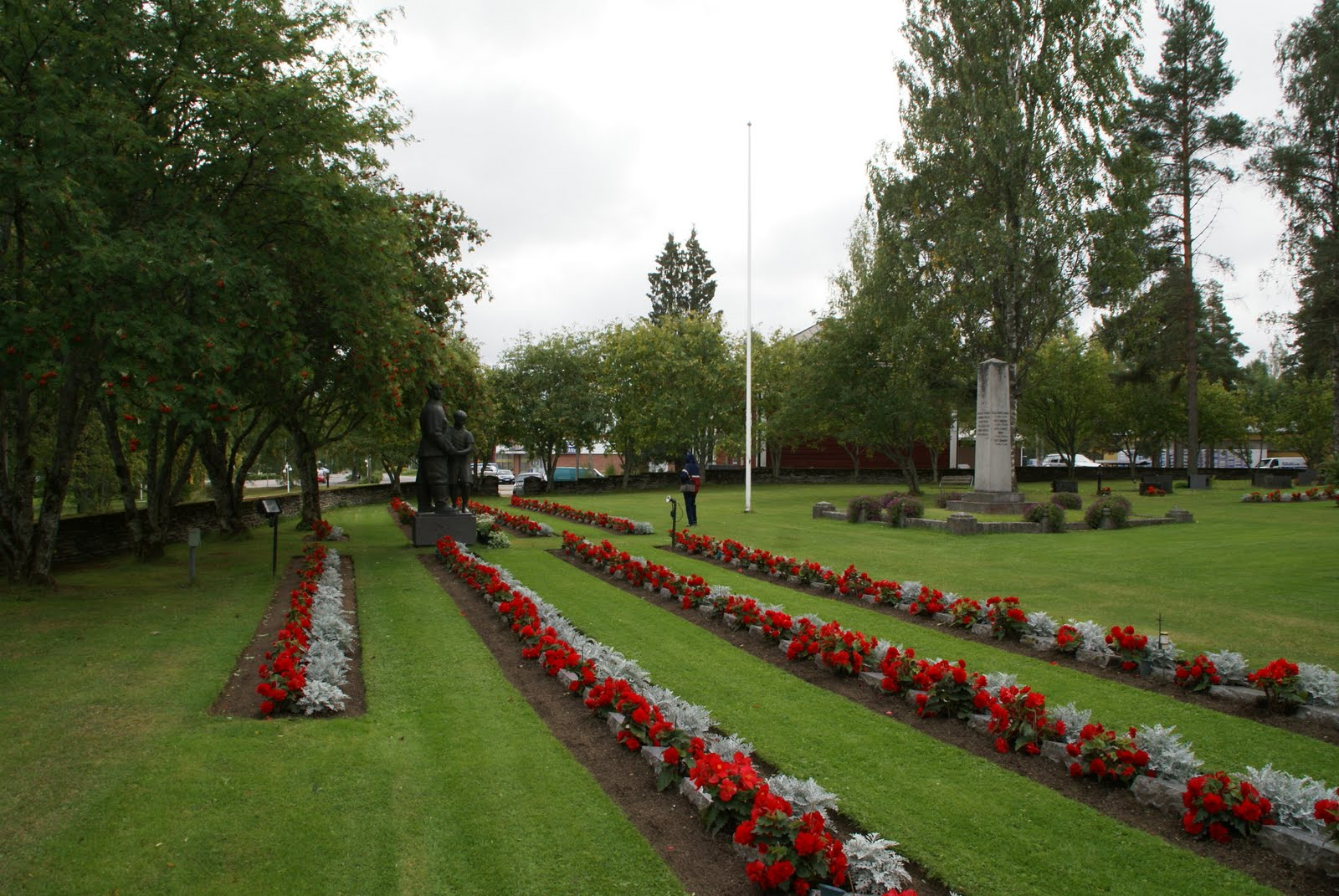
Pihtipudas Military Cemetery, Pihtipudas Church, Finland

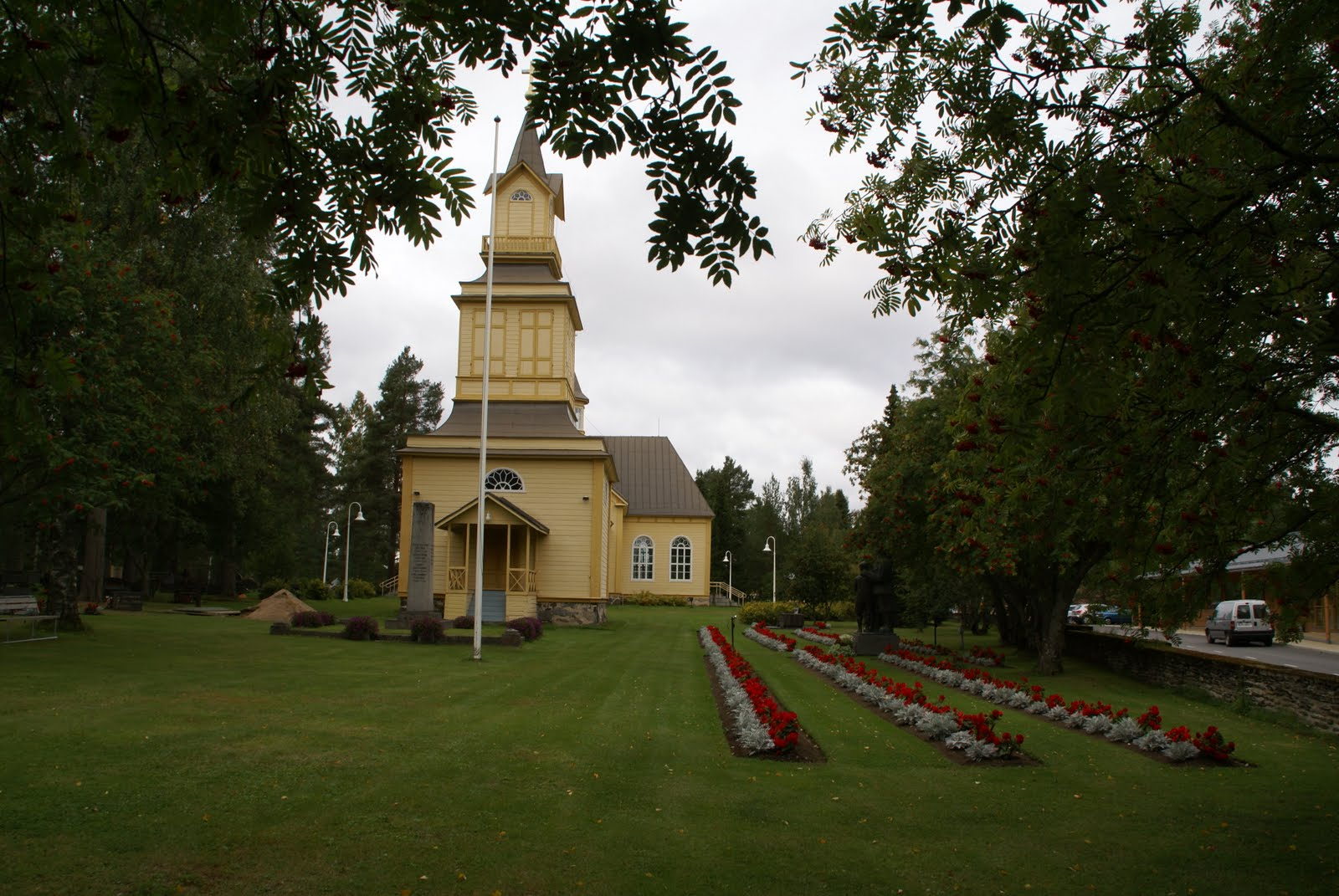
Pihtipudas Church, Central Finland

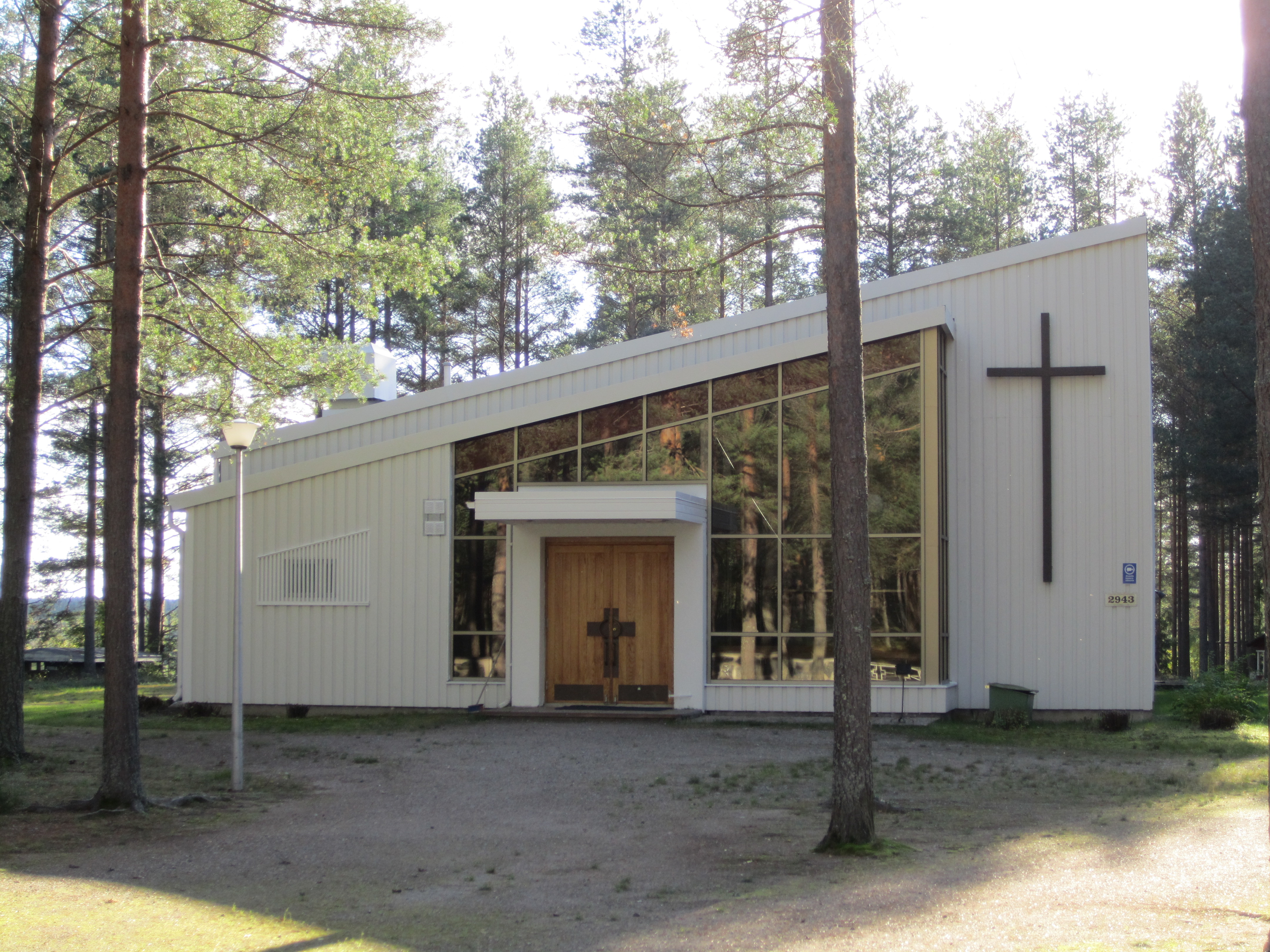
Muurasjärvi Church, municipality of Pihtipudas, Finland

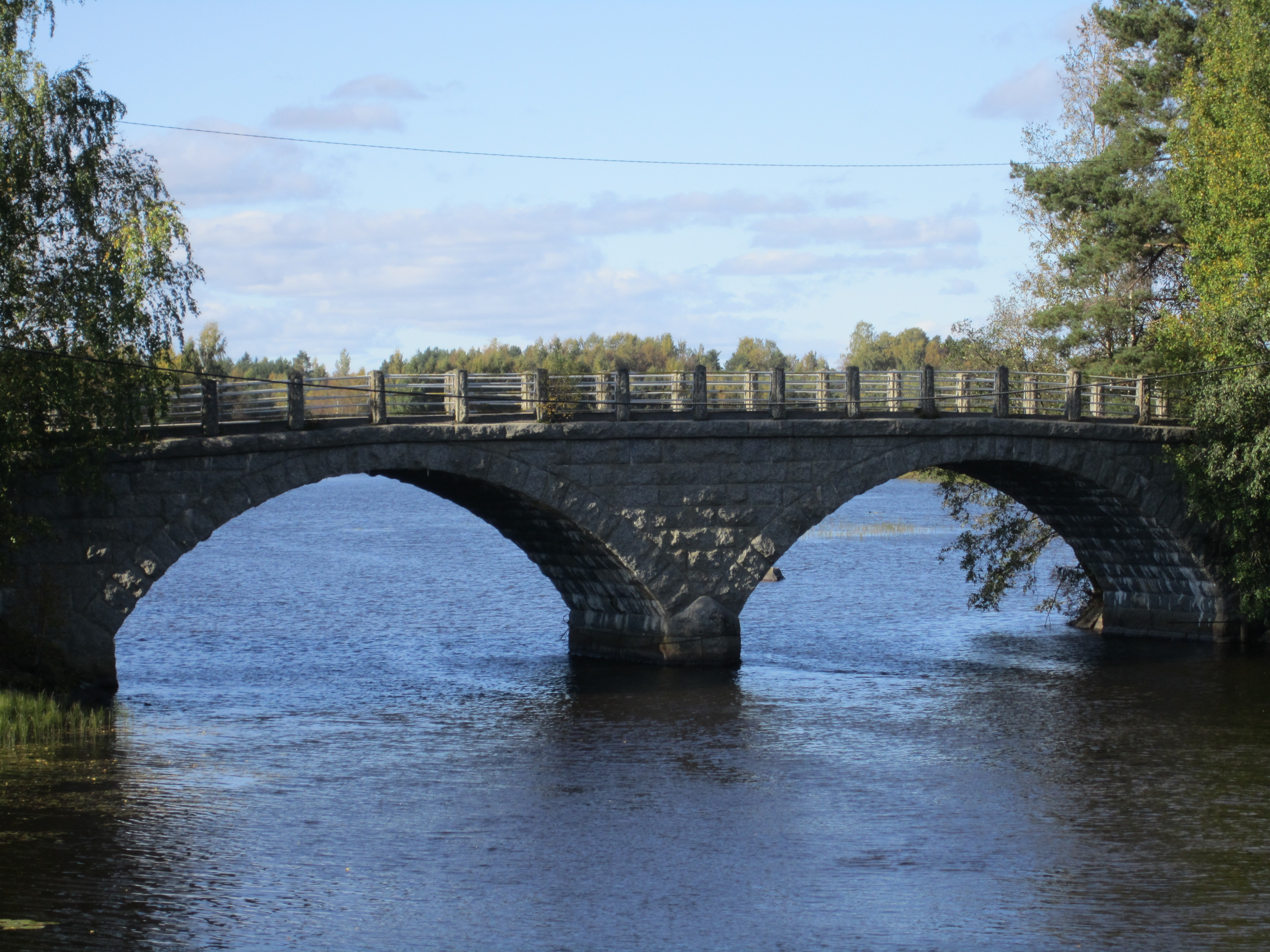
Heinäjoki Bridge and river, Pihtipudas, Finland

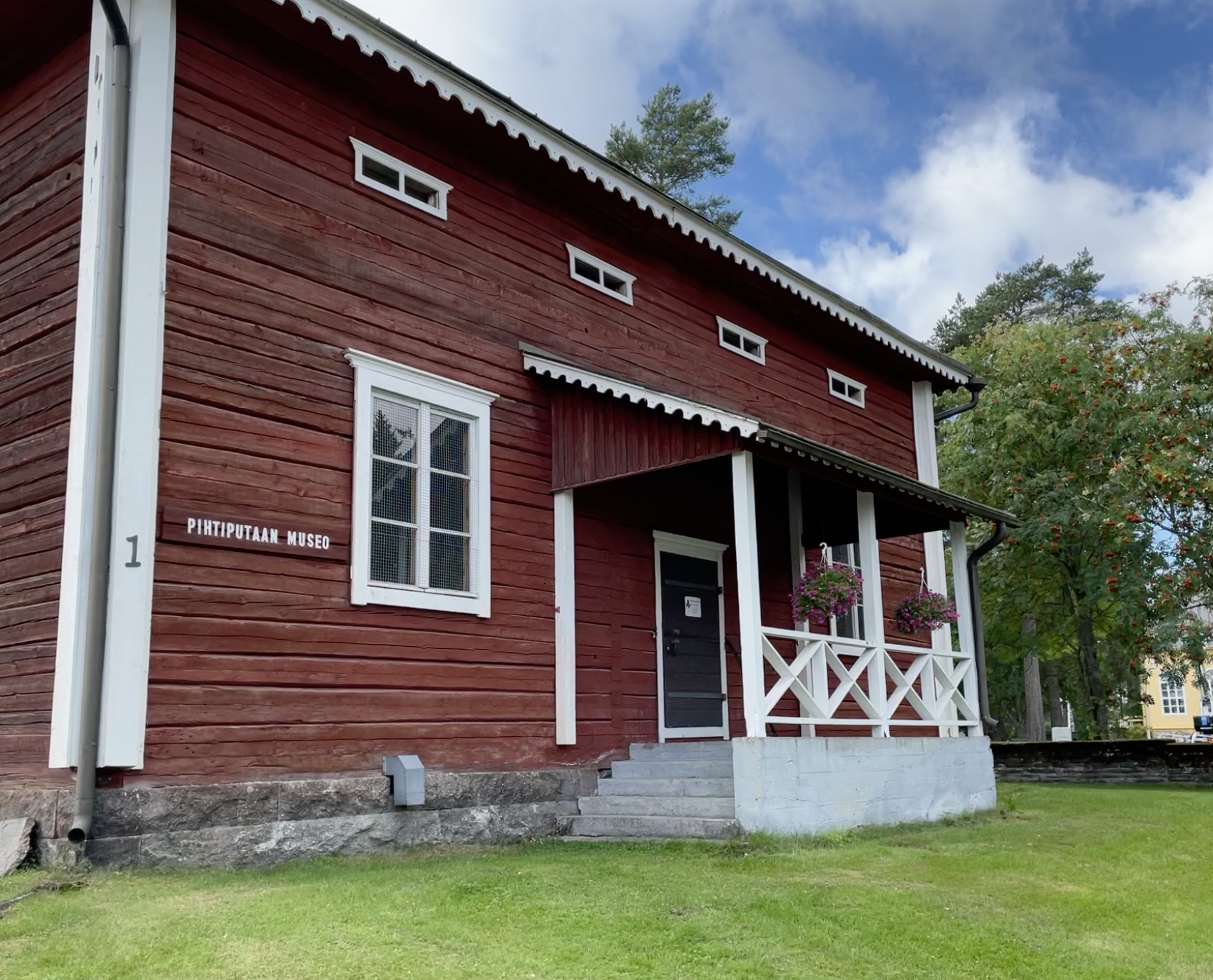
Pihtipudas Museum, Finland

== See also ==
- Eight Deadly Shots
- List of massacres in Finland
