= Saanijärvi =

Body of water of Finland

- Location within Finland
- Coordinates: 63°25′N 25°36′E
- Type: Lake
- Catchment area: Kymijoki
- Basin countries: Finland
- Surface area: 12.636 km^{2} (4.879 sq mi)
- Average depth: 1.96 m (6 ft 5 in)
- Max. depth: 6 m (20 ft)
- Water volume: 0.0248 km^{3} (20,100 acre⋅ft)
- Shore length^{1}: 26.65 km (16.56 mi)
- Surface elevation: 114 m (374 ft)
- Frozen: December–April
- Islands: Orisaari
- Settlements: Pihtipudas
- References: Saanijärvi in Järviwiki Web Service (in English)
- ^{1} Shore length is not a well-defined measure.

Saanijärvi is a medium-sized lake of Finland. It is situated in Pihtipudas in Central Finland and it belongs to the Kymijoki main catchment area.

== See also ==
- List of lakes in Finland
