= En saga =

1892 tone poem by Jean Sibelius

- Tone poem by Jean Sibelius
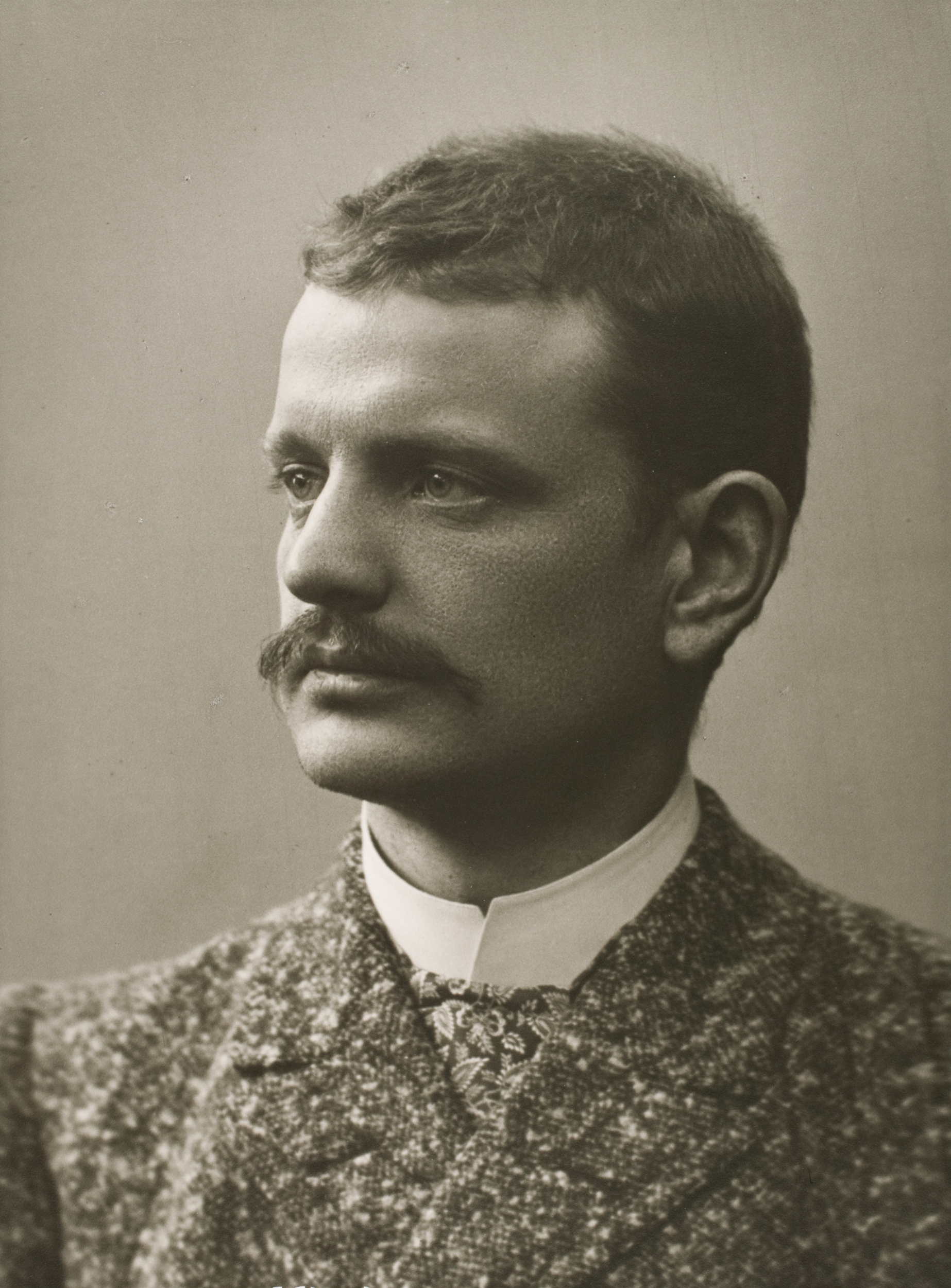
- The composer (c. 1891)
- Opus: 9
- Composed: 1891–1892, rev. 1902
- Publisher: Fazer & Westerlund (1903) (Note: On 20 July 1905, the Helsinki-based music publisher Fazer & Westerlund (Helsingfors Nya Musikhandel) sold its Sibelius holdings (the publishing rights and printing plates) to the German firm of Breitkopf & Härtel.)
- Duration: 18 mins. (orig. 22 mins.)

Premiere
- Date: 16 February 1893
- Location: Helsinki, Grand Duchy of Finland
- Conductor: Jean Sibelius
- Performers: Helsinki Orchestral Association

En saga (in Finnish: Satu; occasionally translated to English as, variously, A Fairy Tale, A Saga, or A Legend), Op. 9, is a single-movement tone poem for orchestra written from 1891 to 1892 by the Finnish composer Jean Sibelius. The piece, which likely began as a septet or octet for flute, clarinet, and string ensemble before evolving into an orchestral tone poem, premiered on 16 February 1893 in Helsinki with Sibelius conducting the Helsinki Orchestral Association. A decade later in 1902, Sibelius substantially revised En saga in response to an invitation from Ferruccio Busoni to conduct the piece in Berlin. It thus stands alongside The Lemminkäinen Suite (Op. 22), the Violin Concerto (Op. 47), The Oceanides (Op. 73), and the Fifth Symphony (Op. 82) as one of the most overhauled works in his œuvre. The Berlin concert, which occurred a fortnight after Robert Kajanus had premiered the revised version in Helsinki on 2 November, finally brought Sibelius the German breakthrough he had long desired.

En saga is without program or literary source. Nevertheless, the adventurous, evocative character of the music has encouraged many listeners to offer their own interpretations, among them a fantasy landscape (such as that by the Finnish painter Akseli Gallen-Kallela), a hunting expedition, a bard's storytelling, and the essence of Finnish people. Sibelius routinely declined to state a program, although in the 1930s, he conceded that, if one must find an inspiration, the tone poem owed its nature not to The Kalevala, the national epic of Finland, but rather to Iceland's Eddas. By the 1940s, however, Sibelius had reverted to his previous position, describing the work instead as "the expression of a certain state of mind"—one with an unspecified, "painful" autobiographical component—for which "all literary interpretations [were therefore] totally alien".

Critics have largely praised En saga as a masterpiece of "astonishing power and originality" that, stylistically, exhibits Sibelius's "personal brand of musical primitivism". Moreover, the revised version of the tone poem is often described as being of superior craftsmanship relative to the youthful rawness of its predecessor. The first (and to date only) recording of the original version was made in 1995 by Osmo Vänskä and the Lahti Symphony Orchestra. A typical performance of the final version of the piece lasts about 18 minutes, some 4 minutes fewer than its predecessor.

== History ==
=== Composition ===
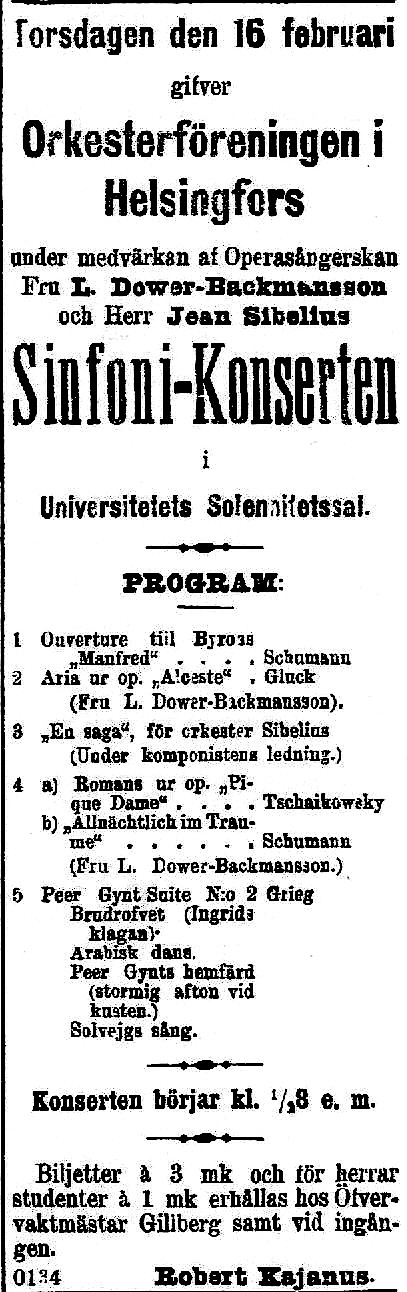
A 16 February 1893 ad (in Swedish) from Nya Pressen promoting the premiere of Sibelius's En saga.

Although the creative origins of En saga remain somewhat uncertain, it appears as though the material that would become En saga may have begun as, and thus evolved from, a septet or octet for flute, clarinet, and string ensemble that the composer had begun in 1890–91, during which time he was a student in Vienna under Robert Fuchs and Karl Goldmark. (This chamber piece, however, has never been found.) Following the early success of the choral symphony Kullervo, premiered in April 1892, Robert Kajanus, founder and chief conductor of the Helsinki Orchestral Association, requested from Sibelius a purely orchestral piece, albeit one "in a more popular style" that would not make "too great demands on [the general public's] powers of concentration and comprehension"; in the 1930s, Sibelius told his biographer, Karl Ekman, that the result of this invitation was the orchestral tone poem En saga.

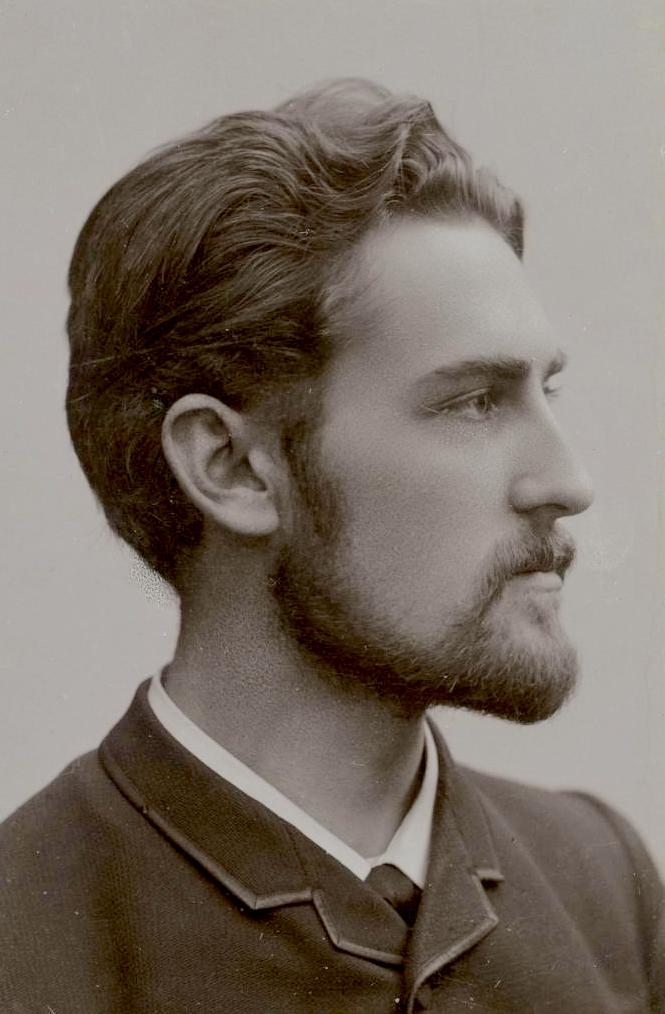
Sibelius composed En saga at Robert Kajanus's request.

Later in life, however, Sibelius dismissed Kajanus's influence, telling a second biographer, Eric Ringbom, in the 1950s that En saga actually had not been the result of Kajanus's offer: "... Nothing came of it. Instead I completed the orchestral work I had already started and to which I gave the name En saga ... I did not comply with his request ... to write 'a short Da capo piece'". That Sibelius's statements to Ekman and to Ringbom are inconsistent is, perhaps, a sign either that Sibelius wished to downplay the influence of his on-again-off-again friend/rival decades after the latter's death (Kajanus had died in 1933) or that he was eager to dispel any notion that En saga was of less seriousness than his other compositions.

The autograph manuscript of the original 1892 version of En saga does not survive, although a manuscript and complete set of orchestral parts are preserved in the Helsinki Philharmonic Orchestra collection. The copyist for these documents remains unknown; although surviving invoices indicate that two copyists Sibelius typically employed, August Österberg and Ernst Röllig, each copied the score, in July 1895 and December 1898, respectively, neither the surviving manuscript nor the orchestral parts are in the hand of either man. Most likely the documents were produced in 1901 by an unidentified copyist for the conductor Georg Schnéevoigt, who conducted the original version of the tone poem during his concert tour of Riga.

==== Revision ====
In 1902, the Italian composer, conductor, and pianist, Ferruccio Busoni, began a series of concerts (eventually 12 in all, from 1902 to 1909) with the Berlin Philharmonic at the Philharmonie's Beethovensaal (Beethoven Hall). According to Della Couling, Busoni's biographer, the concerts courted controversy from the beginning: Busoni's decision to feature new, modern (largely non-German/Austrian) music in a city famous for its devotion to celebrated homegrown talent only reinforced the perception in Berlin that Busoni was a bit of a "maverick". (Note: Busoni's selections certainly challenged German norms; according to Couling, "The astounding achievements of German and Austrian composers … had brought German music to the front rank in Europe, but unfortunately had helped feed a growing chauvinism, and the belief that only German music was worth taking seriously".) In June, Busoni invited Sibelius, his longtime friend, to conduct En saga (he also suggested as substitutes both the Second Symphony and the tone poem The Wood Nymph) at the beginning of November:

I am planning a number of concerts of new music in Berlin... whose purpose will be to introduce little-known music of real merit. You shall in this scheme play a leading part in one of them. Will you do me the honor of conducting En saga? At the beginning of November. The Philharmonic Orchestra. Two rehearsals. I beg you to give your word not to disappoint my hopes. I watch with the greatest delight your German successes which I foresaw as a certainty.

— Ferruccio Busoni, in a June 1902 letter to Sibelius

Sibelius seems to have countered with a choral work (possibly the recently completed cantata The Origin of Fire), since Busoni later replied, "Unfortunately I cannot give myself up to the uncertainty and inconvenience caused by singers ... Therefore, I believe we had better stick to the 'pure' orchestra". Although Sibelius remained undecided between the Second Symphony and En saga until October, he eventually opted for the tone poem in revised form. Sibelius took the decision to revise En saga while summering in Tvärminne (Hanko), as evidenced by a July 28 letter Axel Carpelan, Sibelius's friend and patron, wrote to his cousin after having visited the composer in Tvärminne. Nevertheless, delay ensued: Sibelius did not receive the manuscript in Tvärminne until (at least) September 24. (Note: The manuscript likely was in Kajanus's possession, who conducted En saga during his summer concert tour of Kiev.) Up against the November deadline, Sibelius raced to complete the revisions in a month, and to save time, he likely reused pages from the original manuscript that required little alteration. According to Wicklund, it is this technique that probably accounts for the fact that the autograph manuscript of the original version does not survive.

=== Performances ===
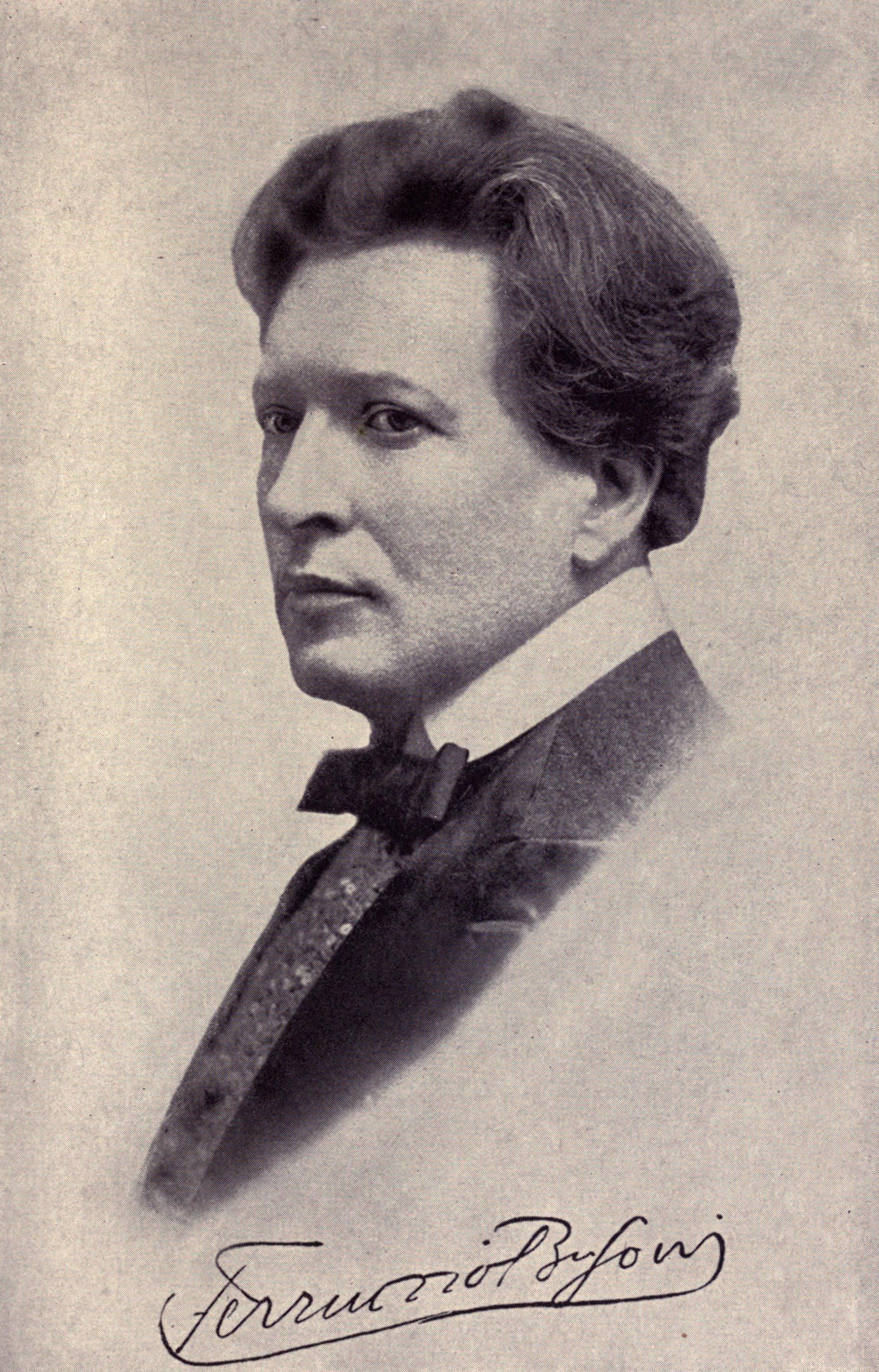
Italian composer, Ferruccio Busoni (c. 1911), a friend of Sibelius's who provided him with the opportunity to conduct the revised version of En saga in Berlin in 1902

The original version of the tone poem premiered on 16 February 1893 at Solemnity Hall of the University of Helsinki with Sibelius conducting the Helsinki Orchestral Association; the concert program also included Edvard Grieg's Peer Gynt Suite II and Robert Schumann's Manfred, as well as songs by various composers, all of which Kajanus conducted. As noted above, both Kajanus and Schnéevoigt included En saga on various subsequent concert tours.

The piece was given its British premiere on 4 October 1906 at the Promenade Concerts, conducted by Henry Wood at Queen's Hall.

==== German breakthrough ====
Although Sibelius had overhauled En saga expressly for the Busoni concert, the premiere of the revised version of the tone poem fell not to Berlin but to Helsinki on 2 November 1902, with Kajanus conducting the Helsinki Philharmonic Society; the program also included Svendsen's Second Symphony and Bruch's Violin Concerto No. 1. While Finnish critics praised En saga, there was a palpable sense the Helsinki concert was merely a dress rehearsal for the big Berlin unveiling. The Berlin concert was indeed an important event for Sibelius: not only would it mark just the second time he had conducted abroad, (Note: The first being Heidelberg in the summer of 1901, which had featured two of the Lemminkäinen Legends.) but it would also give him the opportunity to present personally his art to a discerning Central European audience. Finnish critics sought to buoy Sibelius by writing that, in their opinion, En saga was worthy of performance abroad, while the Finnish newspapers promoted the forthcoming concert heavily. A few days later, the stakes became even clearer: the Berlin critics savaged the first of Busoni's concerts on 8 November, the program of which included selections from Edward Elgar's The Dream of Gerontius, the Overture to Camille Saint-Saëns's opera Les Barbares, and Christian Sinding's Rondo Infinito.

This was the environment into which Sibelius stepped as second on Busoni's 15 November program, which also included Frederick Delius's orchestral nocturne Paris, Théophile Ysaÿe's Piano Concerto, and Ödön Mihalovich's ballad The Death of Pan ("my fellow competitors", as Sibelius referred to them in a 12–13 November letter to his wife, Aino). Sibelius was under constant stress: during the journey to Germany, he labored over the orchestral parts, many of which contained copy errors; upon arrival, he fumed over being second on the program and was annoyed that the promised rehearsals had both been scheduled for 13 November. Nevertheless, the rehearsals went well and the players reacted favorably to the tone poem: as Sibelius told Aino, "It is so beautiful... Busoni even embraced me".

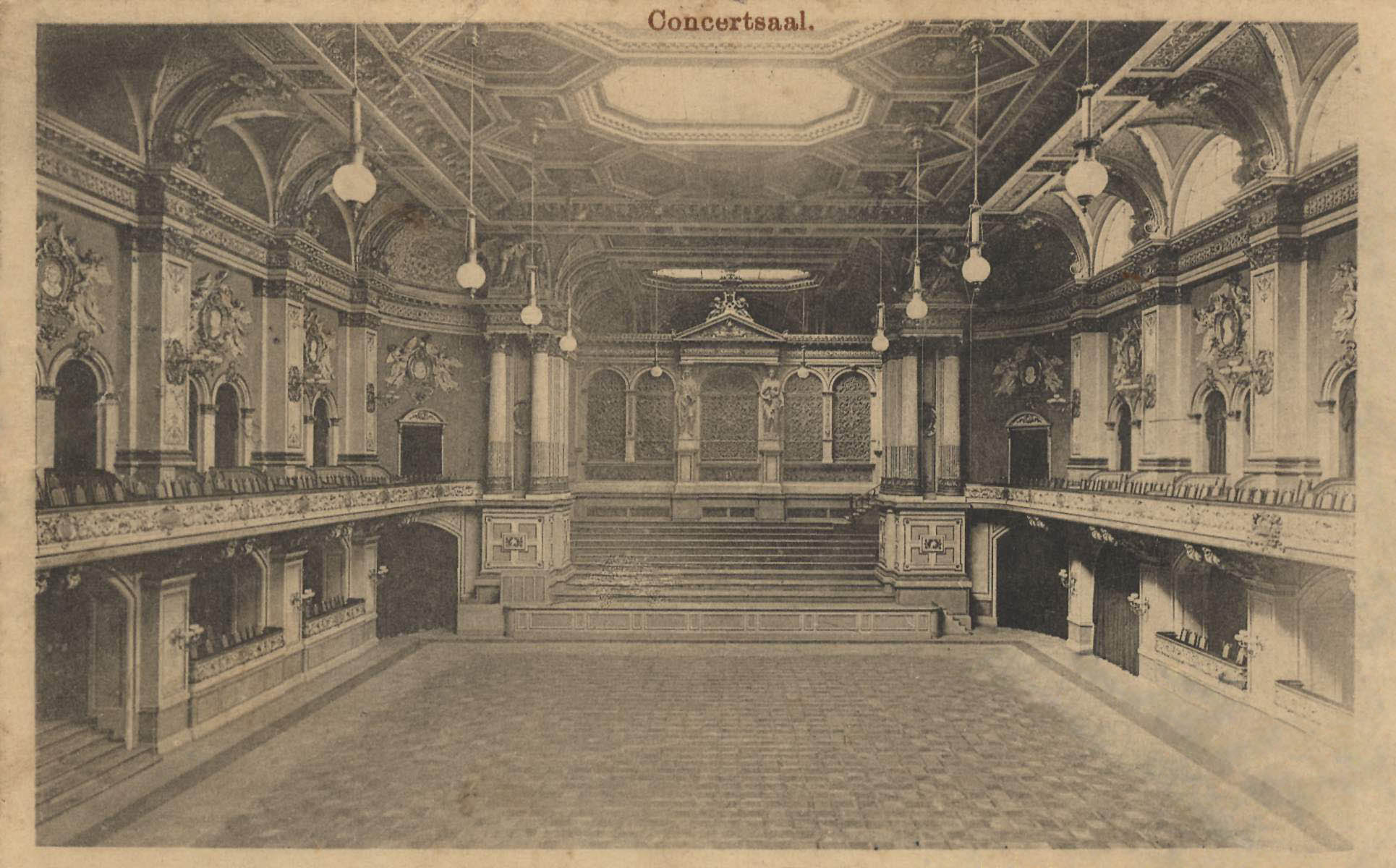
Beethoven Hall (c. 1902) of the old Philharmonie (the building was destroyed in 1944 during the war), where at the Busoni concerts occurred

The Berlin critics' reaction to the second concert, however, was hostile. Otto Lessmann of Allgemeine Musik-Zeitung described the performance as "painful", noting acerbically, "If steps forward in art should be illustrated in such works, the muse would veil her head"; while, Rudolph Buck opined in Berliner Neueste Nachrichten, "After the complete fiasco of the second concert, the announcement that these orchestral concerts would be continued in the autumn of 1903 sounded little short of blasphemous". Nonetheless, it appears as though Sibelius emerged more or less unscathed; indeed, the consensus opinion was that En saga was "the only valuable work" on the program. The positive reviews in the wake of the concert clearly lifted Sibelius's spirits. Following the concert, a confident Sibelius recounted for his wife the quality of both his art and his conducting:

It went very well. My En saga was the best novelty, I think. I was very calm and conducted well... The main thing is that I can conduct a world-class orchestra. And well! ... I am so calm and sure about my art now. I have been acknowledged as an accomplished 'artist'... We could break through anywhere. And brilliantly.

— Jean Sibelius, in a series of letters to his wife, Aino Sibelius, dated 16–17 November 1902

As Tawaststjerna notes, thanks to En saga, at last the "ice had been broken for Sibelius in Germany", a success for which he had long hoped. Sibelius celebrated as Busoni's guest at a "lavish" dinner party.

== Instrumentation ==
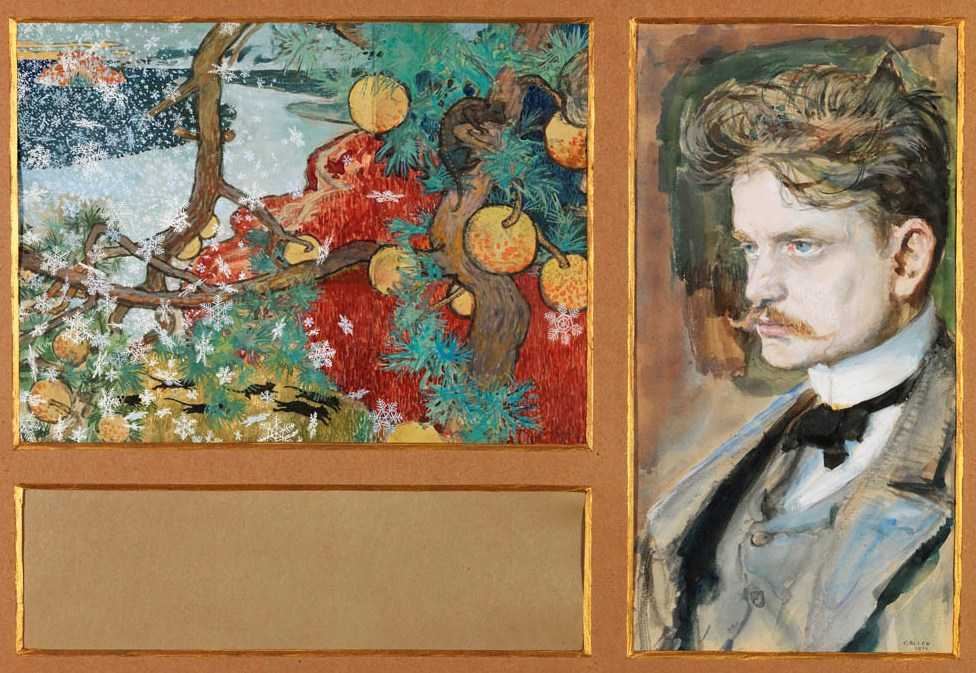
Sibelius as the Composer of En saga (1894), by the Finnish painter Akseli Gallen-Kallela

En saga is scored for the following instruments, organized by family (woodwinds, brass, percussion, and strings):

- 2 flutes, 2 oboes, 2 clarinets (in B♭), and 2 bassoons
- 4 horns (in F), 3 trumpets (in F), 3 trombones, and tuba
- Bass drum, cymbals (suspended and clash), and triangle
- Violins (I and II), violas, cellos, and double basses

Uncommonly for a Sibelius score, there is no part for timpani, the place of which the bass drum takes; according to the Sibelius writer Cecil Gray, the latter's "indeterminate pitch" contributes to the work's "dark, sinister tone-quality".

== Music ==
En saga consists of three main subjects—A, B, and C—and follows an A B C B C B C A structure that is "simplicity itself":

The piece begins with a mood-setting, dissonant introduction for "quacking", "querulous" woodwinds:

Introductory passage for woodwinds (Measures 9–17)

After this, Subject A arrives on the bassoons, doubled by pizzicati cellos and basses. It is a lyrical but mysterious melody played over muted, arpeggiated strings and a cymbal roll with drumsticks.

Subject A (measures 34–49, just before Marker B)

Subject B, which the "quacking" woodwinds at the beginning of the piece had anticipated, arrives at rehearsal marker F; the violas give it its first expression.

Subject B (Marker F, measures 150–157)

Subject C, which the first violins introduce at rehearsal marker H, is a "vigorous dance" characterized by four repeated half-notes.

Subject C (Marker H, measures 197–212)

== Derivative works ==
The creative origins of En saga remain somewhat uncertain, although Sibelius's statements to Ekman and Furuhjelm indicate the piece may have evolved from sketches for a septet or octet the composer had begun in 1890–91. To date, however, researchers have been unable to recover the pre-En saga chamber piece, either as a completed manuscript or unfinished sketches (again, if such a composition ever existed). Gregory Barrett, professor of clarinet at the Northern Illinois University School of Music, has nonetheless sought to reclaim this (purported) "lost chamber masterpiece", arranging in 2003 the original 1892 orchestral tone poem for flute, clarinet, two violins, viola, cello, and string bass. (Note: For the project, Barrett obtained a copy of the original 1892 orchestral tone poem from the Helsinki Philharmonic Orchestra and received permission to make the arrangement from both the copyright holder, Breitkopf & Härtel, and the Sibelius family.)

Contemporary accounts that describe the Barrett septet as a "reconstruction" are inaccurate; because Sibelius's 1890–91 sketches do not survive, there is no way to know how similar Sibelius's own chamber piece was to the first orchestral version of En saga and, by extension, to Barrett's chamber arrangement. (Note: Breitkopf & Härtel, the septet's publisher, for example, describes the piece as an "approximate reconstruction".) (Note: Andrew Barnett in particular has warned against such imprecise language: "I am told that this is merely a chamber arrangement of the original 1892–93 version of En saga. If that's so it might be an effective piece, and no doubt is arranged with great skill, but it would have little similarity with any chamber piece that Sibelius wrote (or in this case didn't write, I firmly believe). I don't want to be a spoilsport but, if you're looking for a lost masterpiece, this has all the hallmarks of a red herring ... please note also the distinction between an arrangement of an orchestral work and a reconstruction of a lost chamber work"! (underscore in original)) It is for this reason that the Barrett septet is not included on the 13-volume BIS Complete Sibelius Edition, a 2007–11 project billed as having recorded every note Sibelius ever penned.

On 14 June 2003, six musicians from the Lahti Symphony Orchestra joined Barrett (on clarinet) to premiere the septet at the Brahmssaal (Brahms Hall) of the Musikverein in Vienna, the city where Sibelius claimed to have composed his own (lost) pre-En saga septet/octet; the Austrian-Finnish Friendship Society sponsored the performance, while the Finnish Embassy hosted a reception after the concert. The Barrett septet was first recorded in May 2008 at the Sigyn Hall in Turku, Finland, by the Turku Ensemble and released on 12 July 2011 by Pilfink Records. Many reviews note the conspicuous absence of the tone poem's brass and percussion, although one of the performers, flautist Ilari Lehtinen, has argued the septet compensates by making "the intimate aspects of the work sound more personal and more heart-rending". Writing for Fanfare, Steven Ritter has praised the septet as "remarkable", noting that although "acute listeners will miss the brass and all the pomp and beauty of orchestral majesty that we associate with Sibelius", Barrett's arrangement "has much to offer and loses little atmosphere". Carl Bauman, writing for the American Record Guide, on the other hand, has argued the musical material "doesn’t fare nearly as well here as it does in its orchestration".

== Discography ==
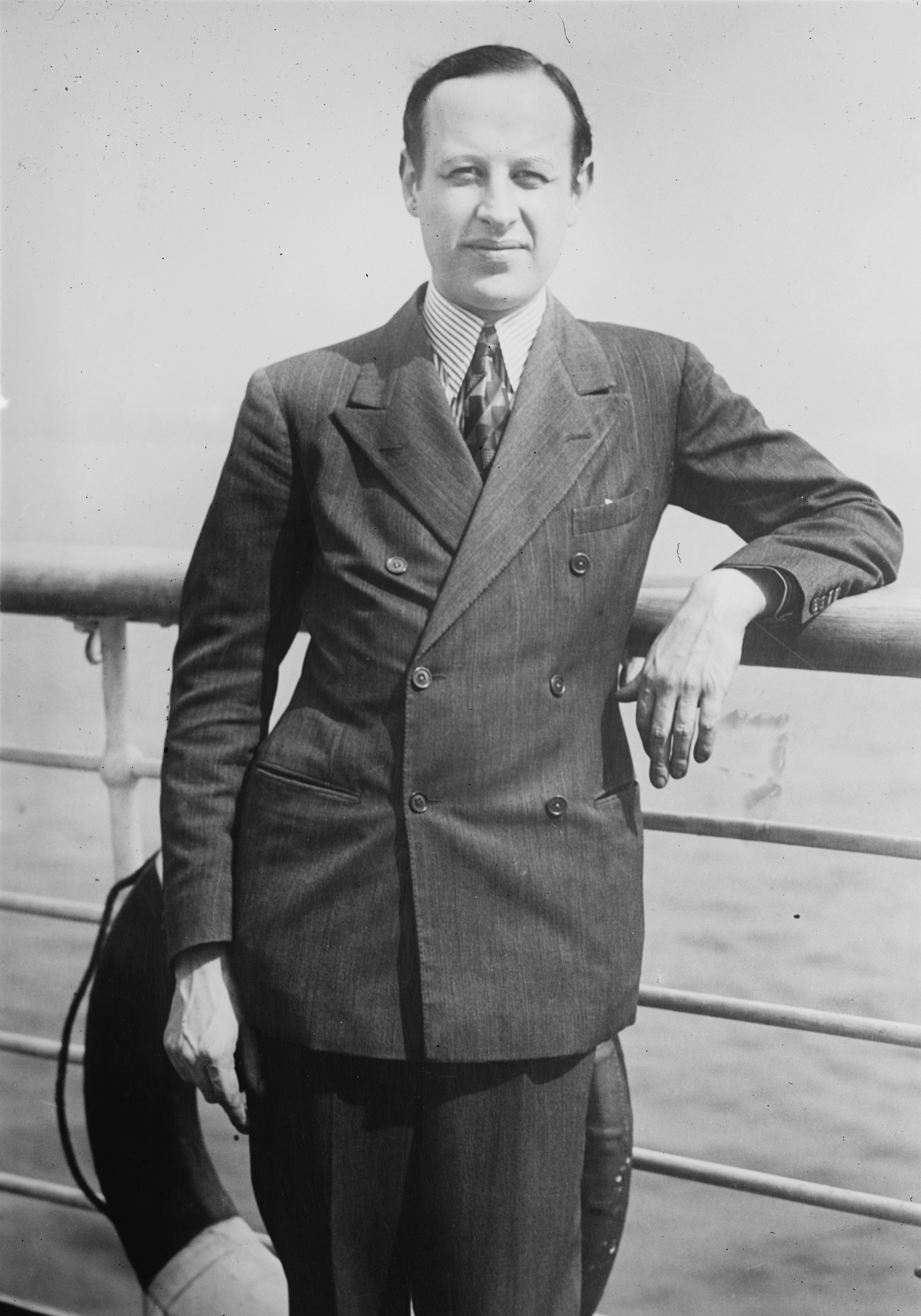
The English conductor Eugene Goossens was the first to record En saga, in 1930 for Victrola.

The English conductor Eugene Goossens and the New Symphony Orchestra of London made the world premiere studio recording of En saga in May 1930; this first appeared on the Victrola label in 1935. Since then, the piece has become one of Sibelius's most commonly recorded tone poems, although it trails more famous compositions such as The Swan of Tuonela and Finlandia. In terms of superlatives, two conductors have made three recordings each: Eugene Ormandy (1955, 1963, and 1975; each with the Philadelphia Orchestra) and Sir Colin Davis (1980, 1994, 2003; each with a different orchestra).

In May 1995, Osmo Vänskä and the Lahti Symphony Orchestra—with special permission from Sibelius's estate—made the world premiere recording of the original 1892 version of the tone poem, which appeared on the same album as their recording of the original 1915 version of the Fifth Symphony. This album premiered to considerable acclaim. Gramophone's James McCarthy, for example, characterized it as perspective-changing, noting that the original versions of the pieces provided "fascinating material for comparison" and allowed "a glimpse of two familiar masterpieces in the making". Kurt Moses, writing in the American Record Guide, similarly commended the album for providing "rare insight into a composer's creative process", but cautioned that "while Sibelius enthusiasts will love it ... this is not a 'must buy' for everyone ... [and] is not a substitute for ... the final versions of these works".

The sortable table below contains these and other commercially available recordings of En saga:

No.	Conductor	Ensemble	Rec. (Note: Refers to the year in which the performers recorded the work; this may not be the same as the year in which the recording was first released to the general public.)	Time	Recording venue	Label	Ref.
1	Eugene Goossens	New Symphony Orchestra of London	1930	?	Kingsway Hall	Victrola	(Note: E. Goossens–Victrola (9925) 1935)
2	Sir Thomas Beecham	London Philharmonic Orchestra (1)	1938	17:32	Abbey Road Studio No. 1	Naxos Historical	(Note: T. Beecham–Naxos Historical (8.110867) 2003)
3	Wilhelm Furtwängler	Berlin Philharmonic (1)	1943	20:29	Alte Philharmonie Berlin	Deutsche Grammophon	(Note: W. Furtwängler–DG (427 783–2) 1989)
4	Victor De Sabata	London Philharmonic Orchestra (2)	1946	18:57	Walthamstow Assembly Hall	Decca	(Note: V. De Sabata–Decca (KX 1504) 1948)
5	Arturo Toscanini	NBC Symphony Orchestra	1952	17:30	Carnegie Hall	RCA Victor Gold Seal	(Note: A. Toscanini–RCA Victor Gold Seal (790 353) 1990)
6	Eduard van Beinum	Royal Concertgebouw Orchestra	1952	19:14	Concertgebouw, Amsterdam	Decca	(Note: E. van Beinum–Decca (485 1387) 2023)
7	Eugene Ormandy (1)	Philadelphia Orchestra (1)	1955	15:41	Academy of Music, Philadelphia	Sony Classical	(Note: E. Ormandy–Sony Classical 2021)
8	Sir Adrian Boult	London Philharmonic Orchestra (3)	1956	17:36	Walthamstow Assembly Hall	Omega Classics	
9	Sir Anthony Collins	Royal Philharmonic Orchestra (1)	1957	18:00	Walthamstow Assembly Hall	Beulah	(Note: A. Collins–Beulah (6PD8) 1994)
10	Sir Malcolm Sargent	Vienna Philharmonic	1961	18:29	Musikverein	EMI Classics	(Note: M. Sargent–EMI Classics (CDE 7 67787 2) 1993)
11	Eugene Ormandy (2)	Philadelphia Orchestra (2)	1963	16:57	Philadelphia Athletic Club	Sony Classical	(Note: E. Ormandy–Sony Classical (88875108582) 2015)
12	George Szell	Cleveland Orchestra	1965	18:35	Severance Hall	Musical Arts Association	(Note: G. Szell–Musical Arts Association (TCO–GS97) 1997)
13	Antal Doráti	London Symphony Orchestra (1)	1969	18:48	Abbey Road Studio No. 1	EMI Classics	(Note: A. Doráti–EMI Classics (7243 5 85785 2 2) 2007)
14	Kurt Sanderling	Berlin Symphony Orchestra	1970	19:54	Christuskirche, Berlin	Brilliant Classics	(Note: K. Sanderling–Brilliant Classics (6328/5) 2002)
15	Horst Stein	L'Orchestre de la Suisse Romande	1971	16:12	Victoria Hall	Decca	(Note: H. Stein–Decca (482 3922) 2015)
16	Okko Kamu	Finnish Radio Symphony Orchestra (1)	1972	18:28	"Concert Hall", Helsinki (Note: Given the recording date, "Concert Hall" probably refers to the then-newly completed Finlandia Hall, which opened in 1971 and became the Finnish Radio Symphony Orchestra's main venue.)	Deutsche Grammophon	(Note: O. Kamu–Deutsche Grammophon (453 610–2) 1996)
17	Paavo Berglund	Bournemouth Symphony Orchestra	1974	18:54	Southampton Guildhall	EMI Classics	(Note: P. Berglund–EMI Classics (7243 5 69773 2 7) 2000)
18	Eugene Ormandy (3)	Philadelphia Orchestra (3)	1975	18:09	Scottish Rite Cathedral, Philadelphia	Sony Classical	(Note: E. Ormandy–Sony Classical (88875108582) 2015)
19	Herbert von Karajan	Berlin Philharmonic (2)	1976	18:16	Berlin Philharmonie	EMI Classics	(Note: H. Karajan–EMI Classics (CDM 7 64331 2) 1992)
20	Sir Alexander Gibson (1)	Royal Scottish National Orchestra	1977	18:08	Glasgow City Halls	Chandos	(Note: A. Gibson–Chandos (CHAN 8395/6) 1985)
21	Sir Colin Davis (1)	Boston Symphony Orchestra	1980	17:49	Symphony Hall, Boston	Decca Records	(Note: C. Davis–Decca (478 3696) 2012)
22	Vladimir Ashkenazy	Philharmonia Orchestra	1981	19:27	Kingsway Hall	Decca	(Note: V. Ashkenazy–Decca (473 590–2) 2003)
23	Neeme Järvi (1)	Gothenburg Symphony Orchestra (1)	1985	18:35	Gothenburg Concert Hall	BIS	(Note: N. Järvi–BIS (CD–295) 1986)
24	Jerzy Salwarowski	Polish Radio National Symphony Orchestra	c. 1987	19:33	[unknown venue]	Musical Heritage Society	(Note: J. Salwarowski–Musical Heritage Society (MHS 512070M) 1987)
25	Jukka-Pekka Saraste	Finnish Radio Symphony Orchestra (2)	1988	18:05	Kulttuuritalo	RCA Red Seal	(Note: J. Saraste–RCA (19439704812) 2020)
26	Sir Alexander Gibson (2)	Royal Philharmonic Orchestra (2)	1989	16:59	St. John's, Smith Square	Collins Classics	(Note: A. Gibson–Collins Classics (10932) 1991)
27	Adrian Leaper	Slovak Philharmonic Orchestra	1989	17:27	Reduta, Bratislava	Naxos	(Note: A. Leaper–Naxos (8.550200) 1991)
28	William Boughton	Royal Philharmonic Orchestra (3)	1990	19:17	Watford Colosseum	Nimbus	(Note: W. Boughton–Nimbus (NI7716/7) 2000)
29	Leif Segerstam	Danish National Symphony Orchestra	1991	19:37	Danish Radio Concert Hall	Chandos	(Note: L. Segerstam–Chandos (CHAN 8965) 1991)
30	Esa-Pekka Salonen	Los Angeles Philharmonic Orchestra	1991	17:26	Royce Hall	Sony Classical	(Note: E. Salonen–Sony Classical (SK 48 067) 1992)
31	Sergiu Comissiona	Helsinki Philharmonic Orchestra	1991	20:27	Hyvinkääsali	Ondine	(Note: S. Comissiona–Ondine (ODE 767–2) 1991)
32	Vassily Sinaisky	Moscow Philharmonic Orchestra	1991	17:45	Mosfilm Studios	Brilliant Classics	(Note: V. Sinaisky–Brilliant Classics (BC9212) 2010)
33	Yoel Levi	Atlanta Symphony Orchestra	1992	17:47	Woodruff Arts Center	Telarc	(Note: Y. Levi–Telarc (CD–80320) 1993)
34	Lorin Maazel	Pittsburgh Symphony Orchestra	1992	17:08	Heinz Hall	Sony Classical	(Note: L. Maazel–Sony Classical (SK 53272) 1994)
35	Neeme Järvi (2)	Gothenburg Symphony Orchestra (2)	1992	17:52	Gothenburg Concert Hall	Deutsche Grammophon	(Note: N. Järvi–DG (477 6654) 2007)
36	Sir Colin Davis (2)	London Symphony Orchestra (2)	1994	18:48	Blackheath Concert Halls	RCA Red Seal	(Note: C. Davis–RCA Red Seal (82876–55706–2) 2003)
†	Osmo Vänskä	Lahti Symphony Orchestra	1995	21:51	Ristinkirkko	BIS	(Note: O. Vänskä–BIS (CD–800) 1996)
37	Tuomas Hannikainen	Tampere Philharmonic Orchestra	1995	18:09	Tampere Hall	Ondine	(Note: T. Hannikainen–Ondine (ODE 871–2) 1996)
38	Sir Andrew Davis	Royal Stockholm Philharmonic Orchestra	1996	17:26	Stockholm Concert Hall	Finlandia	(Note: A. Davis–Finlandia (0630–15242–2) 1997)
39	Ole Schmidt	Royal Philharmonic Orchestra (4)	1996	17:52	CTS Studios, Wembley	Intersound	(Note: O. Schmidt–Intersound (2891) 2000)
40	Mikko Franck	Swedish Radio Symphony Orchestra	1999	19:46	Berwald Hall	Ondine	(Note: M. Frank–Ondine (ODE 953–2) 2000)
41	Petri Sakari	Iceland Symphony Orchestra	2000	18:54	[unknown venue], Reykjavík	Naxos	(Note: P. Sakari–Naxos (8.555299) 2002)
42	Osmo Vänskä	Lahti Symphony Orchestra	2000	18:03	Sibelius Hall	BIS	(Note: O. Vänskä–BIS (CD–1225) 2002)
43	Sir Colin Davis (3)	Staatskapelle Dresden	2003	19:22	Semperoper	Profil	(Note: C. Davis–Profil (PH05049) 2005)
44	Stefan Solyom	BBC Scottish Symphony Orchestra	2006	19:54	Glasgow City Halls	BBC Music Magazine	(Note: S. Solyom–BBC Music Magazine (BBC MM283) 2007)
45	Sir Mark Elder	The Hallé	2014	17:40	Bridgewater Hall	Hallé	(Note: M. Elder–Hallé (CD HLL 7543) 2016)
46	Sakari Oramo	BBC Symphony Orchestra	2015	19:23	Royal Albert Hall	BBC Music Magazine	(Note: S. Oramo–BBC Music Mag (BBCMM441) 2019)
47	Hannu Lintu	Finnish Radio Symphony Orchestra (3)	2016	18:40	Helsinki Music Centre	Ondine	(Note: H. Lintu–Ondine (ODE 1289-5) 2017)
48	Thomas Søndergård	BBC National Orchestra of Wales	2018	18:06	BBC Hoddinott Hall	Linn	(Note: T. Søndergård–Linn (CKD 566) 2018)
49	Santtu-Matias Rouvali	Gothenburg Symphony Orchestra (3)	2018	19:01	Gothenburg Concert Hall	Alpha	(Note: S. Rouvali–Alpha (ALPHA 440) 2018)

† = original version (1892)

Where a conductor or orchestra has recorded the piece more than once, a number has been added (in brackets) to help distinguish the recordings and clarify the results of sorting the list.

== Notes, references, and sources ==
=== Sources ===
- Barnett, Andrew (2007). Sibelius. New Haven: Yale University Press.
- Couling, Della (2005). Ferruccio Busoni: A Musical Ishmael. Lanham, Maryland: Scarecrow Press.
- Dahlström, Fabian [in Swedish] (2003). Jean Sibelius: Thematisch-bibliographisches Verzeichnis seiner Werke [Jean Sibelius: A Thematic Bibliographic Index of His Works] (in German). Wiesbaden: Breitkopf & Härtel. ISBN 3-7651-0333-0.
- Ekman, Karl [in Finnish] (1938) [1935]. Jean Sibelius: His Life and Personality. Translated by Birse, Edward. New York: Alfred A. Knopf. OCLC 896231.
- Goss, Glenda Dawn (2009). Sibelius: A Composer's Life and the Awakening of Finland. Chicago: University of Chicago Press. ISBN 978-0-226-00547-8.
- Gray, Cecil (1931). Sibelius. London: Oxford University Press.
- Hurwitz, David (2007). Sibelius: The Orchestral Works, an Owner's Manual. Pompton Plains, New Jersey: Amadeus Press.
- Johnson, Harold (1959). Jean Sibelius. New York: Alfred A. Knopf.
- Ringbom, Nils-Eric (1954). Jean Sibelius: A Master and His Work. Norman, Oklahoma: University of Oklahoma Press.
- Tawaststjerna, Erik (1976). Sibelius: Volume 1, 1865–1905. Translated by Robert Layton. London: Faber and Faber.
- Wicklund, Tuija (2014). Jean Sibelius's En saga and Its Two Versions: Genesis, Reception, Edition, and Form (PDF). Studia Musica (Thesis). Vol. 57. University of the Arts Helsinki, Sibelius Academy.
