= Lemminkäinen Suite =

Cycle of four tone poems by Jean Sibelius

- Cycle of tone poems by Jean Sibelius
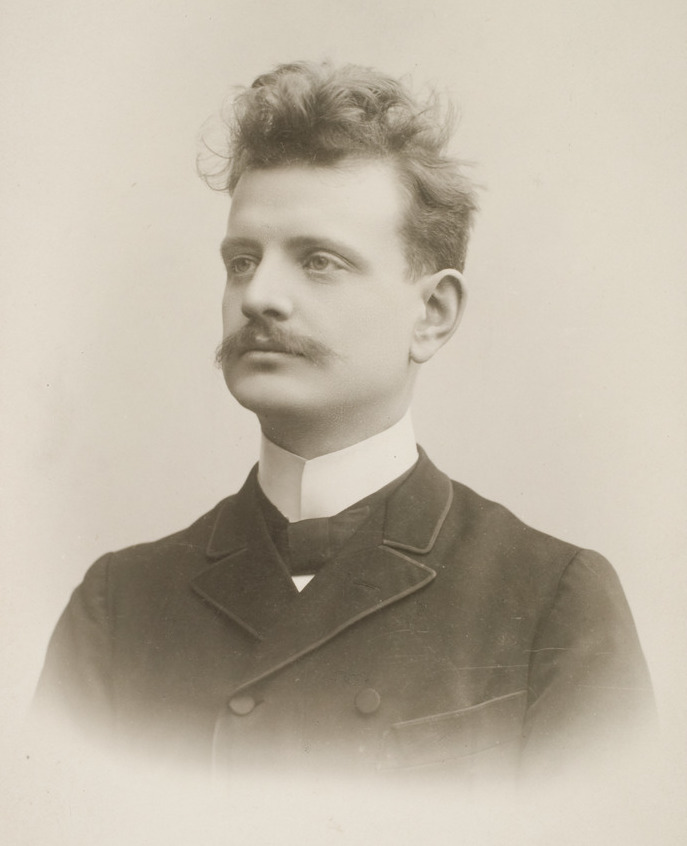
- The composer (c. 1895)
- Native name: Lemminkäis-sarja
- Opus: 22
- Based on: Kalevala (No. 1: Runo XXIX; No. 2: Runo XIV; No. 3: Runo XV, No. 4: Runo XXX)
- Composed: 1893–1895, rev. 1897 (all), 1900 (Nos. 2, 4), 1939 (Nos. 1, 3)
- Publisher: Wasenius (1901, Nos. 2, 4); Breitkopf & Härtel (1954, Nos. 1, 3)
- Duration: 50 mins.
- Movements: 4

Premiere
- Date: 13 April 1896
- Location: Helsinki, Grand Duchy of Finland
- Conductor: Jean Sibelius
- Performers: Helsinki Philharmonic Society

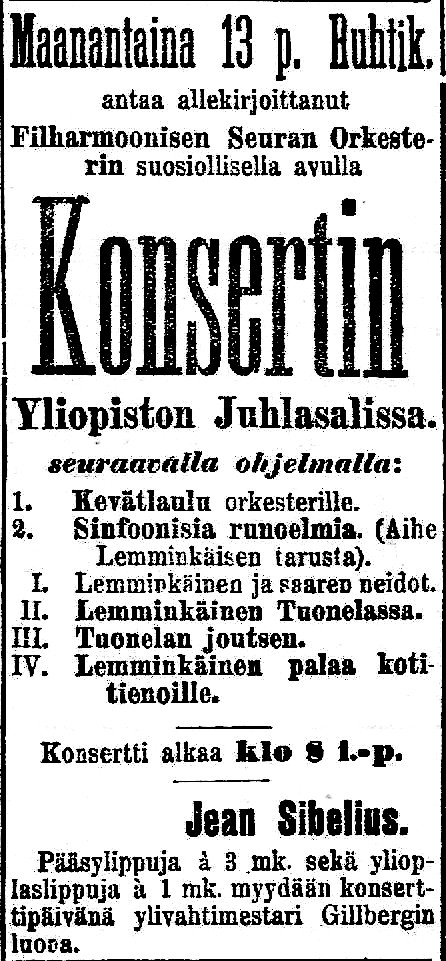
An 12 April 1896 advertisement from Uusi Suometar (in Finnish) promoting the premiere of Sibelius's Lemminkäinen Suite. Note that The Swan of Tuonela is listed in its original position of No. 3.

The Lemminkäinen Suite, or more correctly Four Legends from the Kalevala, Op. 22, is a sequence of four tone poems for orchestra completed in 1896 by the Finnish composer Jean Sibelius. The work was conceived as Veneen luominen (The Building of the Boat), an opera with a mythological setting, before taking its form as a suite. There is a narrative thread: the exploits are followed of the heroic character Lemminkäinen from the Kalevala, which is a collection of folkloric, mythic, epic poetry. The second tone poem, The Swan of Tuonela, is popular as a standalone orchestral work.

== History ==
The piece was originally conceived as a mythological opera before Sibelius abandoned the idea and made it a piece consisting of four distinct movements. The first two though were withdrawn by the composer soon after its premiere and were neither performed, nor added to the published score of the suite until 1935. Sibelius changed the order of the movements when he made his final revisions in 1939, placing The Swan of Tuonela second, and Lemminkäinen in Tuonela third.

Sibelius revised the score in 1897 and 1939.

== Movements ==
- Lemminkäinen and the Maidens of the Island is based on Canto 29 ("Conquests".) of the Kalevala, where Lemminkäinen travels to an island and seduces many of the women there, before fleeing the rage of the men on the island. The movement is also known as Lemminkäinen and the Maidens of Saari, Saari being the Finnish word for island.
- The Swan of Tuonela is the most popular of the four tone poems and often is featured alone from the suite in orchestral programs. It has a prominent cor anglais solo. The music paints a gossamer, transcendental image of a mystical swan swimming around Tuonela, the island of the dead.
- Lemminkäinen in Tuonela is based on Canto 14 ("Elk, horse, swan") and 15 ("Resurrection"). Lemminkäinen is in Tuonela, the land of the dead, to shoot the Swan of Tuonela to be able to claim the daughter of Louhi, mistress of the Pohjola or Northland, in marriage. However, the blind man of the Northland shoots and kills Lemminkäinen with a poisoned arrow, whose body is then tossed in the river and dismembered. Lemminkäinen's mother learns of his death, travels to Tuonela, recovers his body parts, reassembles him and restores him to life.
- Lemminkäinen's Return: The storyline in the score roughly parallels the end of Canto 30 ("Pakkanen"), where after his adventures in battle, Lemminkäinen journeys home.

== Instrumentation ==
Lemminkäinen and the Maidens of the Island is scored as follows:

- 2 flutes (each doubling piccolo), 2 oboes, 2 clarinets (in B♭), and 2 bassoons
- 4 horns (in F), 3 trumpets (in F), and 3 trombones
- Timpani, bass drum, cymbals, and triangle
- Violins (I and II), violas, cellos, and double basses

The Swan of Tuonela is scored as follows:

- Soloist: cor anglais
- 1 oboe, 1 bass clarinet (in B♭), and 2 bassoons
- 4 horns (in F) and 3 trombones
- Timpani and bass drum
- Violins (I and II), violas, cellos, double basses, and harp

Lemminkäinen in Tuonela is scored as follows:

- 2 flutes (each doubling piccolo), 1 oboe, 1 cor anglais, 1 clarinet (in A), 1 bass clarinet (in B♭) and 2 bassoons
- 4 horns (in E♭ and F), 3 trumpets (in E♭ and F), and 3 trombones
- Bass drum, cymbals, triangle, and tambourine
- Violins (I and II), violas, cellos, and double basses

Lemminkäinen's Return is scored as follows:

- 2 piccolos, 2 oboes, 2 clarinets (in B♭), and 2 bassoons
- 4 horns (in F), 3 trumpets (in F), 3 trombones, and tuba
- Timpani, bass drum, cymbals, triangle, tambourine, and glockenspiel
- Violins (I and II), violas, cellos, and double basses

== Discography ==
The sortable table below contains commercially available recordings of the complete Lemminkäinen Suite:

No.	Conductor	Orchestra	Rec. (Note: Refers to the year in which the performers recorded the work; this may not be the same as the year in which the recording was first released to the general public.)	Time	Recording venue	Label	Ref.
1	Eugene Ormandy (1)	Philadelphia Orchestra (1)	1951	44:29	Academy of Music, Philadelphia	Sony Classical	(Note: E. Ormandy–Sony Classical (19439757482) 2021)
2	Sixten Ehrling	Stockholm Philharmonic Orchestra (1)	c. 1952	?	?	Metronome	(Note: S. Ehrling—Metronome (CLP 519) 1953)
3	Thomas Jensen	Danish Radio Symphony Orchestra	1953	45:06	Danish Radio Concert Hall (old)	Decca	(Note: T. Jensen—Decca (478 7946) 2015)
4	Eugene Ormandy (2)	Philadelphia Orchestra (2)	1955	47:12	[Unknown venue], Helsinki	Archipel	(Note: E. Ormandy–Archipel () yyyy)
5	Tauno Hannikainen	U.S.S.R. Radio Symphony Orchestra	c. 1958	46:54	[Unknown venue], Moscow	Melodiya	(Note: T. Hannikainen–Melodiya (D–04726) 1958)
6	Lukas Foss	Buffalo Philharmonic Orchestra	1968	43:43	Kleinhans Music Hall	Nonesuch	(Note: L. Foss—Nonesuch (H–71203) 1968)
7	Jussi Jalas	Hungarian State Symphony Orchestra	1973	44:57	Budapest Recording Studios	Decca	(Note: J. Jalas—Decca (482 3311) 2015)
8	Sir Charles Groves	Royal Liverpool Philharmonic Orchestra	1974	49:20	Liverpool Philharmonic Hall	EMI Classics	(Note: C. Groves–EMI Classics (7243 5 85532 2 2) 2003)
9	Okko Kamu	Finnish Radio Symphony Orchestra (1)	1975^{†}	45:10	Finlandia Hall	Deutsche Grammophon	(Note: O. Kamu—DG (480 3297) 2010)
10	Eugene Ormandy (3)	Philadelphia Orchestra (3)	1978	45:52	The Old Met, Philadelphia	EMI Classics	(Note: E. Ormandy–EMI Classics (0946 3 88679 2 0) 2007)
11	Sir Alexander Gibson (1)	Scottish National Orchestra	1978	44:29	Usher Hall	Chandos	(Note: A. Gibson—Chandos (CHAN 8394) 1985)
12	Horst Stein	L'Orchestre de la Suisse Romande	1980	43:00	Victoria Hall	Decca	(Note: H. Stein–Decca (482 3922) 2015)
13	Neeme Järvi (1)	Gothenburg Symphony Orchestra (1)	1985	48:52	Gothenburg Concert Hall	BIS	(Note: N. Järvi—BIS (CD–294) 1985)
14	Sir Alexander Gibson (2)	Royal Philharmonic Orchestra	1989	45:08	St John's, Smith Square	Collins Classics	(Note: A. Gibson—Collins (30132) 1992)
15	Jukka-Pekka Saraste (1)	Finnish Radio Symphony Orchestra (2)	1989	46:50	Kulttuuritalo	RCA Red Seal	(Note: J. Saraste–RCA (19439704812) 2020)
16	Esa-Pekka Salonen (1)	Los Angeles Philharmonic Orchestra	1991^{†}	45:07	Royce Hall	Sony Classical	(Note: E. Salonen–Sony Classical (SK 48 067) 1992)
17	Vassily Sinaisky	Moscow Philharmonic Orchestra	1991	48:18	Mosfilm Studios	Brilliant Classics	(Note: V. Sinaisky–Brilliant Classics (BC9212) 2010)
18	Pierre Bartholomée	Orchestre Philharmonique de Liège	1995	41:32	Royal Conservatory of Liège	Auvidis	(Note: P. Bartholomée—Auvidis (V 4746) 1995)
19	Leif Segerstam	Helsinki Philharmonic Orchestra (1)	1995^{†}	50:04	Järvenpää Hall	Ondine	(Note: L. Segerstam–Ondine (ODE 852–2) 1996)
20	Paavo Järvi	Royal Stockholm Philharmonic Orchestra (2)	1996	49:23	Stockholm Concert Hall	Virgin Classics	(Note: P. Järvi—Virgin Classics (7243 5 45213 2 4) 1996)
21	Neeme Järvi (2)	Gothenburg Symphony Orchestra (2)	1996	43:28	Gothenburg Concert Hall	Deutsche Grammophon	(Note: N. Järvi–DG (477 6654) 2007)
22	Petri Sakari	Iceland Symphony Orchestra	1997^{†}	48:36	University Hall, Reykjavík	Naxos	(Note: P. Sakari—Naxos (8.554265) 1999)
23	Jukka-Pekka Saraste (2)	Finnish Radio Symphony Orchestra (3)	1998^{†}	45:58	Konzerthaus, Vienna	Classica	(Note: J. Saraste—Classica (CL 138)1999)
24	Jukka-Pekka Saraste (3)	Toronto Symphony Orchestra	1998^{†}	46:03	Massey Hall	Finlandia	(Note: J. Saraste–Finlandia (3984–27890–2) 2000)
25	Osmo Vänskä (1)	Lahti Symphony Orchestra (1)	1999	49:08	Ristinkirkko	BIS	(Note: O. Vänskä—BIS (CD–1015) 1999)
26	Uwe Mund	Kyoto Symphony Orchestra	c. 1999	46:51	?	Arte Nova	(Note: U. Mund—Arte Nova (74321 72120 2) 2000)
27	Mikko Franck	Swedish Radio Symphony Orchestra	1999	53:48	Berwald Hall	Ondine	(Note: M. Franck—Ondine (ODE 953–2) 2000)
28	Sir Colin Davis	London Symphony Orchestra	2000	51:47	Watford Colosseum	RCA Red Seal	(Note: C. Davis–RCA Red Seal (82876–55706–2) 2003)
29	Osmo Vänskä (2)	Lahti Symphony Orchestra (2)	2007	47:06	Sibelius Hall	BIS	(Note: O. Vänskä—BIS (SACD–1745) 2014)
30	Esa-Pekka Salonen (2)	Sibelius Academy Orchestra	2008^{†}	45:06	Walt Disney Concert Hall	Sibelius-Akatemia	(Note: E. Salonen–Sibelius-Akatemia (SACD24) 2008)
31	Hannu Lintu	Finnish Radio Symphony Orchestra (4)	2014	47:44	Helsinki Music Centre	Ondine	(Note: H. Lintu–Ondine (ODE 1262–5) 2015)
32	Sakari Oramo	BBC Symphony Orchestra	2018^{†}	46:19	Watford Colosseum	Chandos	(Note: S. Oramo–Chandos (CHAN 20136) 2019)
33	Susanna Mälkki	Helsinki Philharmonic Orchestra (2)	2023	49:36	Helsinki Music Centre	BIS	(Note: S. Mälkki—BIS (SACD–2638) 2023)
34	Santtu-Matias Rouvali	Gothenburg Symphony Orchestra (3)	2024	48:22	Gothenburg Concert Hall	Alpha Classics	(Note: S. Rouvali–Alpha (ALPHA 1215) 2026)

† = This recording utilizes Sibelius's original ordering of the suite, with The Swan of Tuonela played third and Lemminkäinen in Tuonela played second.

Where a conductor or orchestra has recorded the suite more than once, a number has been added (in brackets) to help distinguish the recordings and clarify the results of sorting the list.

The Lahti Symphony Orchestra have recorded the original versions of Lemminkäinen and the Maidens of the Island and Lemminkäinen's Return under Osmo Vänskä (BIS CD-1015), and of Lemminkäinen in Tuonela under Dima Slobodeniuk (BIS 2371).

== Notes, references, and sources ==
=== Sources ===
- Dahlström, Fabian [in Swedish] (2003). Jean Sibelius: Thematisch-bibliographisches Verzeichnis seiner Werke [Jean Sibelius: A Thematic Bibliographic Index of His Works] (in German). Wiesbaden: Breitkopf & Härtel. ISBN 3-7651-0333-0.
- Grimley, Daniel M. (2011). Jean Sibelius and His World. Princeton University Press. ISBN 978-1-4008-4020-5.
- Lönnrot, Elias (1989). The Kalevala. Translated by Bosley, Keith. Oxford University Press, Oxford World Classics edition. ISBN 978-0-19-281700-6.
