= The Swan of Tuonela =

Tone poem by Jean Sibelius

- Tone poem by Jean Sibelius
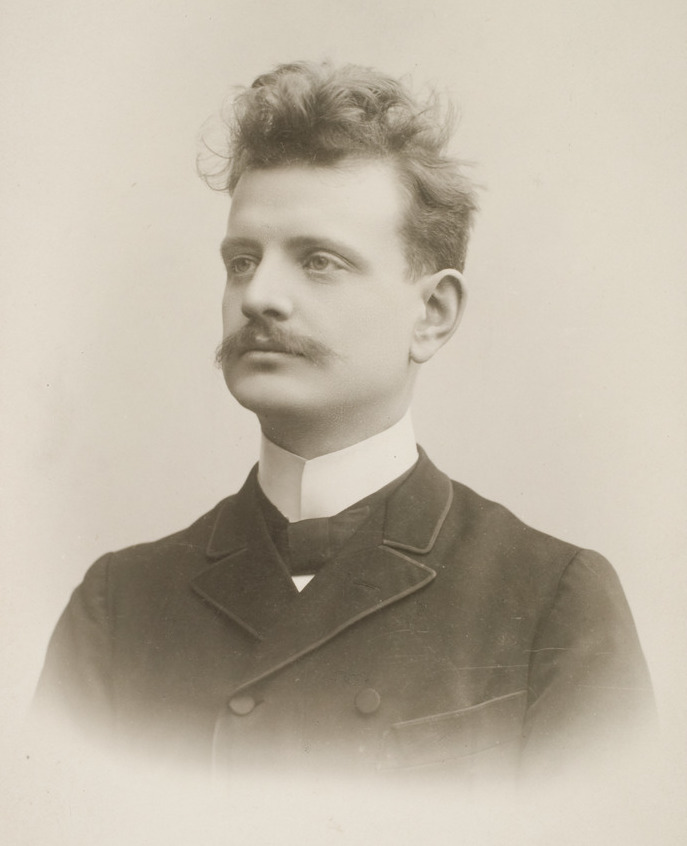
- The composer (c. 1895)
- Native name: Tuonelan joutsen
- Opus: 22/2 (orig. No. 3)
- Based on: Kalevala (Runo XIV)
- Composed: 1893–1895, rev. 1897, 1900
- Publisher: Wasenius (1901)
- Duration: 9 mins.

Premiere
- Date: 13 April 1896
- Location: Helsinki, Grand Duchy of Finland
- Conductor: Jean Sibelius
- Performers: Helsinki Philharmonic Society

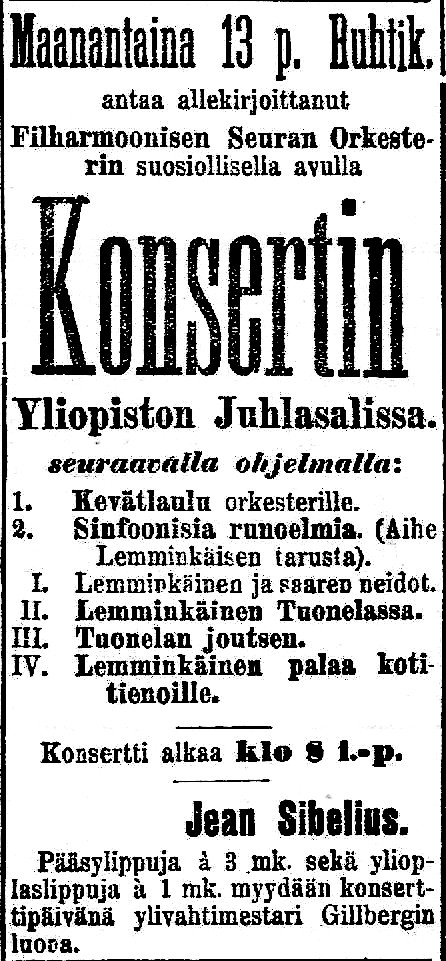
An 12 April 1896 advertisement from Uusi Suometar (in Finnish) promoting the premiere of Sibelius's Lemminkäinen Suite. Note that The Swan of Tuonela is listed in its original position of No. 3.

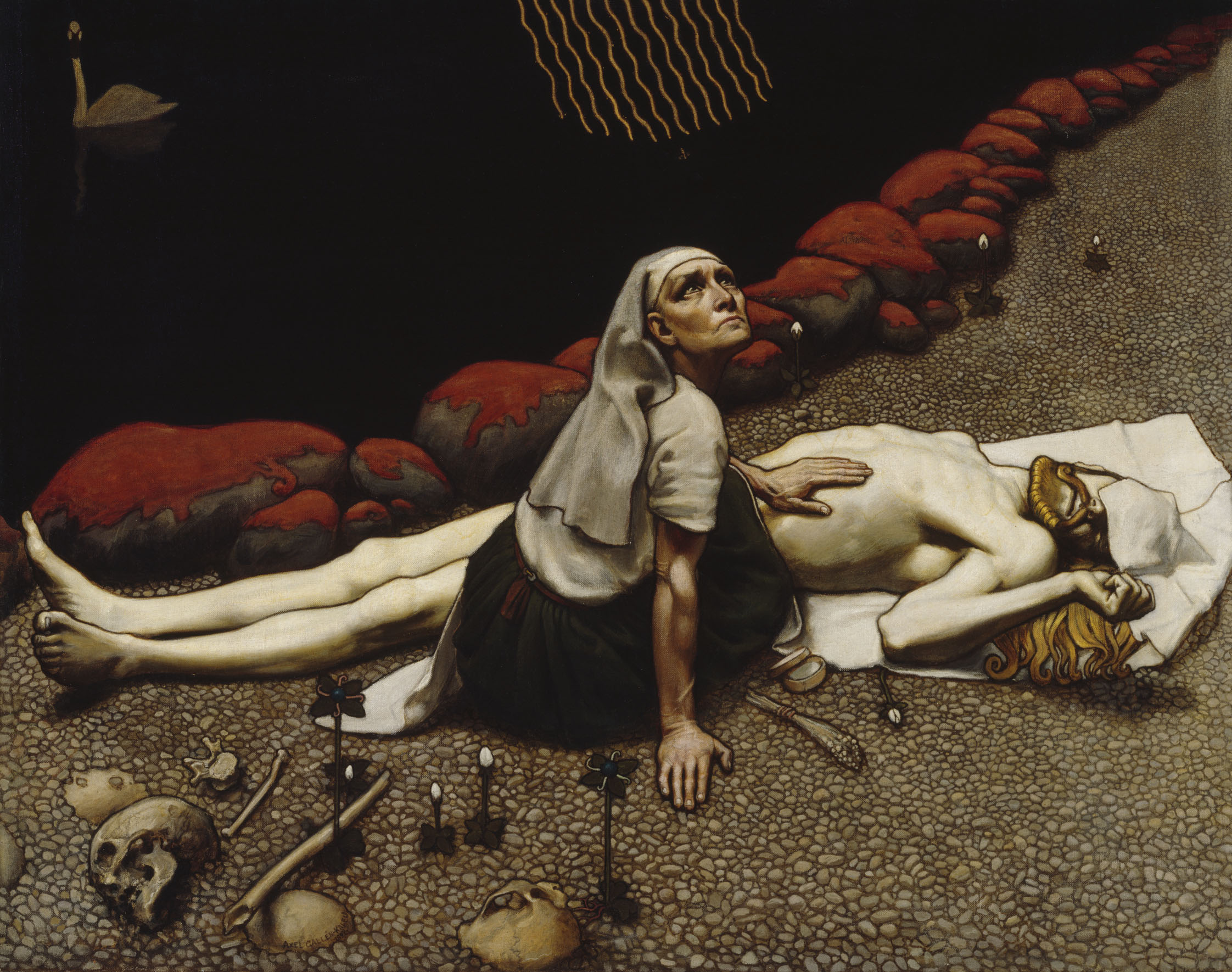
Akseli Gallen-Kallela's 1897 Lemminkäisen äiti (Lemminkäinen's Mother), showing the mother with her slain son from the Swan of Tuonela story.

The Swan of Tuonela (in Finnish: Tuonelan joutsen), Op. 22/2 (originally Op. 22/3), is a single-movement tone poem for cor anglais solo and orchestra written from 1893 to 1895 by the Finnish composer Jean Sibelius. It is part of the Lemminkäinen Suite, a collection of four tone poems based on legends from the Kalevala, Finland's national epic.

The Swan of Tuonela was originally composed in 1893 as the prelude to a projected opera called The Building of the Boat. Sibelius revised it two years later, making it the second section of his Lemminkäinen Suite of four tone poems, which was premiered in 1896. He twice further revised the piece, in 1897 and 1900. Sibelius left posterity no personal account of his writing of the tone poem, and its original manuscript no longer exists (the date of its disappearance is unknown). The work was first published by K. F. Wasenius in Helsingfors (Helsinki), Finland, in April 1901. The German firm Breitkopf & Härtel also published it in Leipzig, also in 1901. The work was recorded for the first time by Leopold Stokowski and the Philadelphia Orchestra in May 1929.

The British premiere of the piece was on 31 August 1905 at the Promenade Concerts at Queen's Hall, conducted by Henry Wood.

== Instrumentation ==
The Swan of Tuonela is scored for the following instruments, organized by family (woodwinds, brass, percussion, and strings):

- Soloist: cor anglais
- 1 oboes, 1 bass clarinet (in B♭), and 2 bassoons
- 4 horns (in F) and 3 trombones
- Timpani and bass drum
- Violins (I and II), violas, cellos, double basses, and harp

The cor anglais is the voice of the swan, and its solo is one of the best known solos in the orchestral literature for that instrument. The string section is divided.

== Structure ==
The music paints a gossamer, transcendental image of a mystical swan floating through Tuonela, the realm of the dead. Lemminkäinen, the hero of the epic, has been tasked with killing the sacred swan, but on the way he is shot with a poisoned arrow and dies. In the next part of the story he is restored to life.

The piece has the tempo marking of Andante molto sostenuto and is in 9/4 time. It is in the key of A minor.

Measures 5–9

== Discography ==
The British conductor Leopold Stokowski and the Philadelphia Orchestra made the world premiere studio recording of The Swan of Tuonela in 1929 for His Master's Voice.

No.	Conductor	Orchestra	Cor anglais	Rec. (Note: Refers to the year in which the performers recorded the work; this may not be the same as the year in which the recording was first released to the general public.)	Time	Recording venue	Label	Ref.
1	Leopold Stokowski (1)	Philadelphia Orchestra (1)	Marcel Tabuteau	1929	8:33	[Unknown venue]	Guild Historical	(Note: L. Stokowski–Guild Historical (GHCD 2428) 2015)
2	Frederick Stock	Chicago Symphony Orchestra	[uncredited]	c. 1940	?	?	Columbia Masterworks	(Note: F. Stock—Columbia Masterworks (11388–D) 1940)
3	Eugene Ormandy (1)	Philadelphia Orchestra (2)	[uncredited]	1940	8:21	Academy of Music, Philadelphia	RCA Red Seal	(Note: E. Ormandy–RCA Red Seal (19658771062) 2025)
4	Arturo Toscanini (1)	NBC Symphony Orchestra (1)	[uncredited]	1940	9:54	Rockefeller Center	Naxos Historical	(Note: A. Toscanini–Naxos Historical (8.110810) 1998)
5	Arturo Toscanini (2)	NBC Symphony Orchestra (2)	[uncredited]	1944	9:19	Studio 8H, New York	RCA Red Seal	(Note: A. Toscanini–RCA Red Seal (88697916312) 2012)
6	Arturo Toscanini (3)	New York Philharmonic (1)	[uncredited]	1945	9:47	Carnegie Hall	Guild Historical	(Note: A. Toscanini–Guild Historical (GHCD 2368) 2010)
7	Eugene Ormandy (2)	Philadelphia Orchestra (3)	John Minsker	1950^{†}	9:44	Academy of Music, Philadelphia	Sony Classical	(Note: E. Ormandy–Sony Classical (19439757482) 2021)
8	Sixten Ehrling	Stockholm Philharmonic Orchestra	?	1952^{†}	6:57	?	Metronome	(Note: S. Ehrling—Metronome (CLP 519) 1953)
9	Thomas Jensen	Danish Radio Symphony Orchestra	Tofte Hansen	1953^{†}	7:38	Danish Radio Concert Hall (old)	Decca	(Note: T. Jensen—Decca (478 7946) 2015)
10	Hans Rosbaud	Berlin Philharmonic (1)	Gerhard Stempnik (1)	1954	7:46	Jesus-Christus-Kirche, Berlin	Deutsche Grammophon	(Note: H. Rosbaud–DG (447 453–2) 1996)
11	Sir John Barbirolli (1)	Hallé Orchestra (1)	Roger Winfield	1955	8:30	Free Trade Hall	Warner Classics	(Note: J. Barbirolli–Warner Classics (0190295386085) 2020)
12	Sir Adrian Boult	London Philharmonic Orchestra (1)	[uncredited]	1956	9:45	Walthamstow Assembly Hall	Omega Classics	(Note: A. Boult–Omega Classics (OCD 1027) 1998)
13	Anatole Fistoulari	London Symphony Orchestra (1)	[uncredited]	c. 1956	?	?	MGM	(Note: A. Fistoulari—MGM (E3332) 1956)
14	Leopold Stokowski (2)	Leopold Stokowski Orchestra	Robert Bloom	1957	7:55	Riverside Plaza Hotel	EMI Classics	(Note: L. Stokowski–EMI Classics (50999 6 98555 2 8) 2009)
15	Sir Anthony Collins	Royal Philharmonic Orchestra (1)	Leonard Brain	1957	8:24	Walthamstow Assembly Hall	Beulah	(Note: A. Collins–Beulah (5PD8) 1997)
16	Eugene Ormandy (3)	Philadelphia Orchestra (4)	Louis Rosenblatt (1)	1960	9:50	Broadwood Hotel, Philadelphia	Sony Classical	(Note: E. Ormandy–Sony Classical (SBK 48271) 1992)
17	Sir Malcolm Sargent	Vienna Philharmonic	Günter Lorenz	1961	9:00	Musikverein	EMI Classics	(Note: M. Sargent–EMI Classics (CDE 7 67787 2) 1993)
18	Morton Gould	Morton Gould Orchestra	Albert Goltzer	1962	8:33	Manhattan Center	RCA Red Seal	(Note: M. Gould–RCA Red Seal (88985321742–54) 2016)
19	Herbert von Karajan (1)	Berlin Philharmonic (2)	Gerhard Stempnik (2)	1965	7:42	Jesus-Christus-Kirche, Berlin	Deutsche Grammophon	(Note: H. Karajan–DG (457 748-2) 1999)
20	Yevgeny Mravinsky	Leningrad Philharmonic Orchestra	[uncredited]	1965	9:33	Grand Hall, Moscow Conservatory	Scribendum	(Note: Y. Mravinsky—Scribendum (SC 503) 2011)
21	Sir John Barbirolli (2)	Hallé Orchestra (2)	Eric Fletcher	1966	7:51	Abbey Road Studio No. 1	EMI Classics	(Note: J. Barbirolli–EMI Classics (7243 5 67299 2 6) 2000)
22	Lukas Foss	Buffalo Philharmonic Orchestra (1)	Florence Meyers	1968^{†}	8:41	Kleinhans Music Hall	Nonesuch	(Note: L. Foss—Nonesuch (H–71203) 1968)
23	Paavo Berglund (1)	Bournemouth Symphony Orchestra	Jeffrey Brown	1972	8:46	Southampton Guildhall	EMI Classics	(Note: P. Berglund–EMI Classics (7243 5 69773 2 7) 1997)
24	Eugene Ormandy (4)	Philadelphia Orchestra (5)	Louis Rosenblatt (2)	1973	9:48	Scottish Rite Cathedral, Philadelphia	RCA Victor Silver Seal	(Note: E. Ormandy–RCA Victor Silver Seal (VD 60489) 1987)
25	Leonard Bernstein	New York Philharmonic (2)	Thomas Stacy	1973	9:55	CBS 30th Street Studio	Sony Classical	(Note: L. Bernstein—Sony Classical (SMK 63156) 1998)
26	Jussi Jalas	Hungarian State Symphony Orchestra	[uncredited]	1973^{†}	8:09	Budapest Recording Studios	Decca	(Note: J. Jalas—Decca (482 3311) 2015)
27	Sir Charles Groves	Royal Liverpool Philharmonic Orchestra	Margaret Moore	1974^{†}	7:43	Liverpool Philharmonic Hall	EMI Classics	(Note: C. Groves–EMI Classics (7243 5 85532 2 2) 2003)
28	Okko Kamu	Finnish Radio Symphony Orchestra (1)	Leo Lótjonen	1975^{†}	8:23	Finlandia Hall	Deutsche Grammophon	(Note: O. Kamu—DG (480 3297) 2010)
29	Leopold Stokowski (3)	National Philharmonic Orchestra	Michael Winfield	1976	8:14	West Ham Central Mission	Sony Classical	(Note: L. Stokowski–Sony Classical (88691971152) 2012)
30	Sir Colin Davis (1)	Boston Symphony Orchestra	Laurence Thorstenberg	1976	9:19	Symphony Hall, Boston	Decca Records	(Note: C. Davis–Decca (478 3696) 2012)
31	Herbert von Karajan (2)	Berlin Philharmonic (3)	Gerhard Stempnik (3)	1976	8:27	Berlin Philharmonie	EMI Classics	(Note: H. Karajan–EMI Classics (CDM 7 64331 2) 1992)
32	Eugene Ormandy (5)	Philadelphia Orchestra (6)	Louis Rosenblatt (3)	1978^{†}	9:03	The Old Met, Philadelphia	EMI Classics	(Note: E. Ormandy–EMI Classics (0946 3 88679 2 0) 2007)
33	Sir Alexander Gibson (1)	Scottish National Orchestra	Susan Tyte	1978^{†}	8:16	Usher Hall	Chandos	(Note: A. Gibson—Chandos (CHAN 8394) 1985)
34	Horst Stein	L'Orchestre de la Suisse Romande	[uncredited]	1980^{†}	7:24	Victoria Hall	Decca	(Note: H. Stein–Decca (482 3922) 2015)
35	Paavo Berglund (2)	Philharmonia Orchestra	Christine Pendrill (1)	1982	9:40	St. John's, Smith Square	EMI	(Note: P. Berglund–EMI Digital (CDC 7 47484 2) 1983)
36	Paavo Berglund (3)	Berlin Radio Symphony Orchestra	Manfred Baier	1983	9:02	Christuskirche, Berlin	Brilliant Classics	(Note: K. Sanderling–Brilliant Classics (6328/5) 2002)
37	Herbert von Karajan (3)	Berlin Philharmonic (4)	Gerhard Stempnik (4)	1984	7:50	Berlin Philharmonie	Deutsche Grammophon	(Note: H. Karajan–DG (413 755–2) 1984)
38	Sir Neville Marriner	Academy of St Martin in the Fields	Barry Davis	1984	8:17	[Unknown venue], London	Philips	(Note: N. Marriner—Philips (412 727–2) 1985)
39	Neeme Järvi (1)	Gothenburg Symphony Orchestra (1)	Björn Bohlin (1)	1985^{†}	8:49	Gothenburg Concert Hall	BIS	(Note: N. Järvi—BIS (CD–294) 1985)
40	Kenneth Schermerhorn	Czechoslovak Radio Symphony Orchestra	[uncredited]	1988	7:49	Czechoslovak Radio Concert Hall	Naxos	(Note: K. Schermerhorn–Naxos (8.550103) 1988)
41	Sir Charles Mackerras	London Symphony Orchestra (2)	Christine Pendrill (2)	1988	9:47	Abbey Road Studio No. 1	Regis	(Note: C. Mackerras—Regis (RRC 1220) 2005)
42	Sir Alexander Gibson (2)	Royal Philharmonic Orchestra (2)	[uncredited]	1989^{†}	9:15	St John's, Smith Square	Collins Classics	(Note: A. Gibson—Collins (30132) 1992)
43	Jukka-Pekka Saraste (1)	Finnish Radio Symphony Orchestra (2)	[uncredited]	1989^{†}	8:53	Kulttuuritalo	RCA Red Seal	(Note: J. Saraste–RCA (19439704812) 2020)
44	Esa-Pekka Salonen	Los Angeles Philharmonic Orchestra	Carolyn Hove	1991^{†}	9:27	Royce Hall	Sony Classical	(Note: E. Salonen–Sony Classical (SK 48 067) 1992)
45	Vassily Sinaisky	Moscow Philharmonic Orchestra	Elizaveta Zuyeva	1991^{†}	7:58	Mosfilm Studios	Brilliant Classics	(Note: V. Sinaisky–Brilliant Classics (BC9212) 2010)
46	Yoel Levi	Atlanta Symphony Orchestra	Patrick McFarland	1992	8:17	Woodruff Arts Center	Telarc	(Note: Y. Levi–Telarc (CD–80320) 1993)
47	Mariss Jansons	Oslo Philharmonic Orchestra	Håvard Norang	1992	8:35	Oslo Concert Hall	EMI Classics	(Note: M. Jansons–EMI Classics (0777 7 54804 2 9) 1993)
48	Pierre Bartholomée	Orchestre Philharmonique de Liège	Alain Lovenberg	1995^{†}	7:13	Royal Conservatory of Liège	Auvidis	(Note: P. Bartholomée—Auvidis (V 4746) 1995)
49	Jorma Panula	Turku Philharmonic Orchestra	[uncredited]	1995	8:37	Turku Concert Hall	Naxos	(Note: J. Panula—Naxos (8.551023) 1995)
50	Leif Segerstam	Helsinki Philharmonic Orchestra (1)	Sanna Niemikunnas	1995^{†}	9:56	Järvenpää Hall	Ondine	(Note: L. Segerstam–Ondine (ODE 852–2) 1996)
51	Paavo Järvi	Royal Stockholm Philharmonic Orchestra (1)	Jesper Harryson	1996^{†}	9:49	Stockholm Concert Hall	Virgin Classics	(Note: P. Järvi—Virgin Classics (7243 5 45213 2 4) 1996)
52	Sir Andrew Davis (1)	Royal Stockholm Philharmonic Orchestra (2)	[uncredited]	1996	8:17	Stockholm Concert Hall	Finlandia	(Note: A. Davis–Finlandia (0630–15242–2) 1997)
53	Neeme Järvi (2)	Gothenburg Symphony Orchestra (2)	Björn Bohlin (2)	1996^{†}	7:37	Gothenburg Concert Hall	Deutsche Grammophon	(Note: N. Järvi–DG (477 6654) 2007)
54	Ole Schmidt	Royal Philharmonic Orchestra (3)	Geoffrey Browne	1996	8:18	CTS Studios, Wembley	Intersound	(Note: O. Schmidt–Intersound (2891) 2000)
55	Petri Sakari	Iceland Symphony Orchestra	Daði Kolbeinsson	1997^{†}	9:07	University Hall, Reykjavík	Naxos	(Note: P. Sakari—Naxos (8.554265) 1999)
56	Jukka-Pekka Saraste (2)	Finnish Radio Symphony Orchestra (3)	Päivi Kärkäs	1998^{†}	8:26	Konzerthaus, Vienna	Classica	(Note: J. Saraste—Classica (CL 138)1999)
57	Jukka-Pekka Saraste (3)	Toronto Symphony Orchestra	[uncredited]	1998^{†}	9:02	Massey Hall	Finlandia	(Note: J. Saraste–Finlandia (3984–27890–2) 2000)
58	Osmo Vänskä (1)	Lahti Symphony Orchestra (1)	Jukka Hirvikangas (1)	1999^{†}	9:27	Ristinkirkko	BIS	(Note: O. Vänskä—BIS (CD–1015) 1999)
59	Mikko Franck	Swedish Radio Symphony Orchestra	Bo Eriksson	1999^{†}	10:11	Berwald Hall	Ondine	(Note: M. Franck—Ondine (ODE 953–2) 2000)
60	Sir Colin Davis (2)	London Symphony Orchestra (3)	[uncredited]	2000^{†}	10:53	Watford Colosseum	RCA Red Seal	(Note: C. Davis–RCA Red Seal (82876–55706–2) 2003)
61	Anu Tali	Estonian-Finnish Symphony Orchestra	Pirjo Leppänen	2001	9:02	Estonia Concert Hall	Finlandia	(Note: A. Tali—Finlandia (8573–89876–2) 2001)
62	Eiji Oue	Minnesota Orchestra	Marni Hougham	2002	9:30	Orchestral Hall, Minneapolis	Reference Recordings	(Note: E. Oue—Reference Recordings (RR99–CD) 2002)
63	Esa Heikkilä	Potentia Sinfonica	Saara Kemppi	2004	8:27	Ristinkirkko	Potentia Sinfonica	(Note: E. Heikkilä—Potentia Sinfonica (PSCD–05) 2004)
64	Paavo Berglund (4)	London Philharmonic Orchestra (2)	Sue Böhling	2006	9:12	Queen Elizabeth Hall	LPO	(Note: P. Berglund—LPO (LPO–0065) 2012)
65	Vladimir Ashkenazy	Royal Stockholm Philharmonic Orchestra (3)	Andreas Lemke	2007	8:45	Stockholm Concert Hall	Exton	(Note: V. Ashkenazy—Exton (OVCL–00292) 2007)
66	Osmo Vänskä (2)	Lahti Symphony Orchestra (2)	Jukka Hirvikangas (2)	2007^{†}	9:10	Sibelius Hall	BIS	(Note: O. Vänskä—BIS (SACD–1745) 2014)
67	John Storgårds	BBC Scottish Symphony Orchestra	James Horan	2009	8:45	Glasgow City Halls	BBC Music Magazine	(Note: J. Storgårds—BBC Music Magazine (BBCMM380) 2015)
68	Sir Andrew Davis (2)	Bergen Philharmonic Orchestra	Hege Sellevåg	2013	8:16	Grieg Hall	Chandos	(Note: A. Davis—Chandos (CHSA 5134) 2014)
69	Hannu Lintu	Finnish Radio Symphony Orchestra (4)	[uncredited]	2014^{†}	9:07	Helsinki Music Centre	Ondine	(Note: H. Lintu–Ondine (ODE 1262–5) 2015)
70	JoAnn Falletta	Buffalo Philharmonic Orchestra (2)	Anna Matrix	2014	10:14	Kleinhans Music Hall	Beau Fleuve	(Note: J. Falletta–Beau Fleuve (610708–094975) 2015)
71	Sir Simon Rattle	Berlin Philharmonic (5)	Dominik Wollenweber	2014	8:57	Great Hall, Berliner Philharmonie	Supraphon	(Note: S. Rattle—Supraphon (SU 4303–2) 2021)
72	Sakari Oramo	BBC Symphony Orchestra	Alison Teale	2018^{†}	8:52	Watford Colosseum	Chandos	(Note: S. Oramo–Chandos (CHAN 20136) 2019)
73	Thomas Søndergård	BBC National Orchestra of Wales	Sarah-Jayne Porsmoguer	2018	9:12	BBC Hoddinott Hall	Linn	(Note: T. Søndergård–Linn (CKD 566) 2018)
74	Susanna Mälkki	Helsinki Philharmonic Orchestra (2)	Paula Malmivaara	2023^{†}	9:43	Helsinki Music Centre	BIS	(Note: S. Mälkki—BIS (SACD–2638) 2023)

† = Part of a recording of the entire Lemminkäinen Suite
