= The Dryad (Sibelius) =

Tone poem by Jean Sibelius

- Tone poem by Jean Sibelius
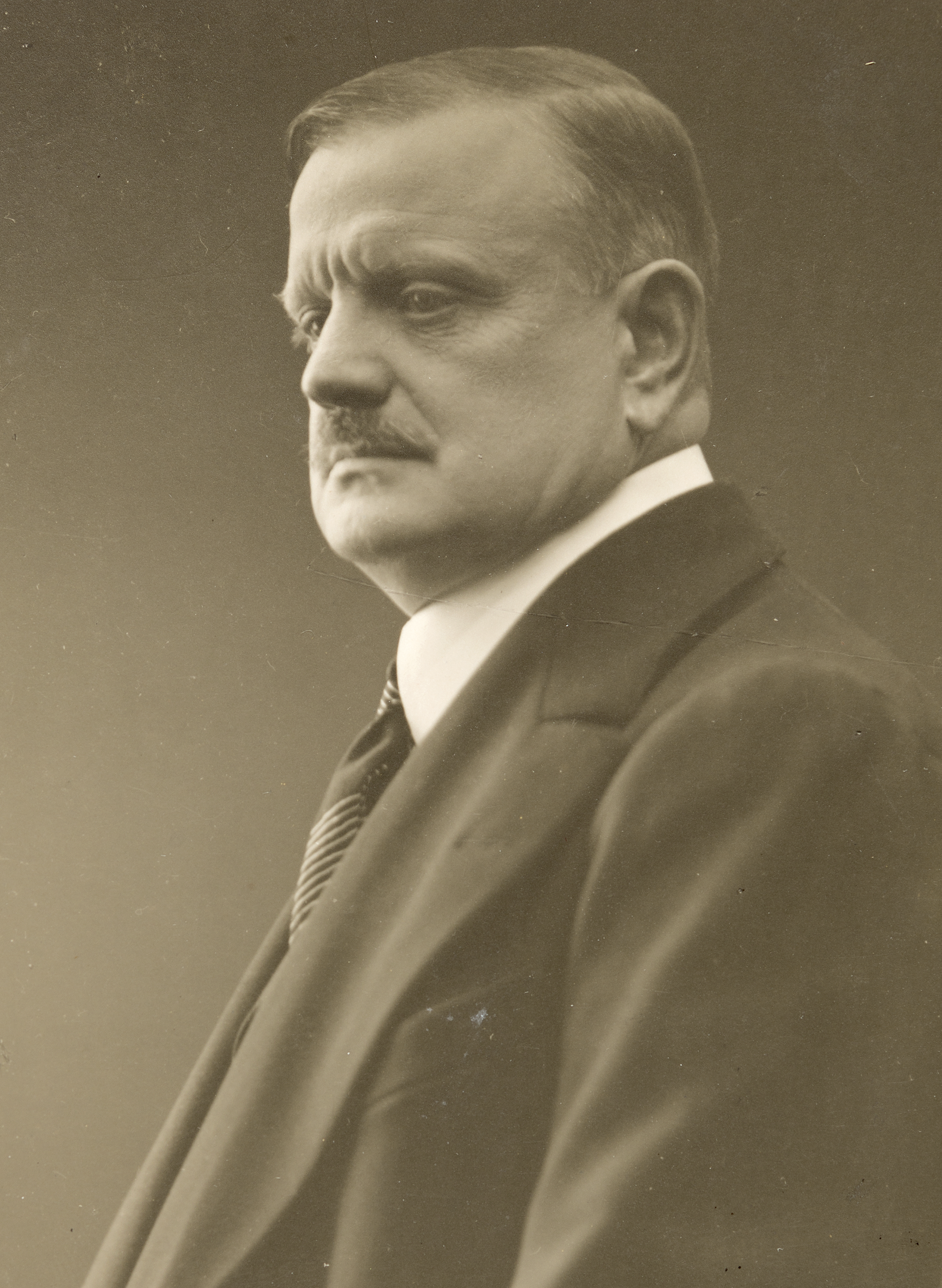
- The composer (c. 1911)
- Native name: Dryadi
- Opus: 45/1
- Composed: 1910
- Publisher: Breitkopf & Härtel (1910)
- Duration: 6 mins.

Premiere
- Date: 8 October 1910
- Location: Kristiania, Norway
- Conductor: Jean Sibelius
- Performers: Kristiania Musical Association

The Dryad (in Finnish: Dryadi), Op. 45/1, is a tone poem for orchestra written in 1910 by the Finnish composer Jean Sibelius. He completed it between skiing trips. He conducted the first performance in Kristiania (now Oslo), Norway, on 8 October 1910, together with the premiere of In memoriam. He arranged it for piano in 1910 (Die Dryade). The piece has been regarded as one of the composer's "shortest and most original orchestral works", as an "impressionist miniature", proceeding from fragments to a "dance-like theme".

== Instrumentation ==
The Dryad is scored for the following instruments, organized by family (woodwinds, brass, percussion, and strings):

- 1 piccolo, 2 flutes, 2 oboes, 2 clarinets (in B♭), 1 bass clarinet (in B♭), and 2 bassoons
- 4 horns (in F), 3 trumpets (in B♭), 3 trombones, and tuba
- Bass drum, snare drum, castanets, and tambourine
- Violins (I and II), violas, cellos, and double basses

== Discography ==
The Finnish conductor Nils-Eric Fougstedt and the Finnish Radio Symphony Orchestra made the world premiere studio recording of The Dryad in 1959 for the Society of Finnish Composers (in Finnish: Suomen Säveltäjät). The table below lists this and other commercially available recordings:

No.	Conductor	Ensemble	Rec. (Note: Refers to the year in which the performers recorded the work; this may not be the same as the year in which the recording was first released to the general public.)	Time	Recording venue	Label	Ref.
1	Nils-Eric Fougstedt	Finnish Radio Symphony Orchestra	1959	?	?	Suomen Säveltäjät	(Note: N. Fougstedt–Suomen Säveltäjät (SS 8) 1959)
2	Sir Charles Groves	Royal Liverpool Philharmonic Orchestra	1975	6:01	Liverpool Philharmonic Hall	EMI Classics	(Note: C. Groves–EMI Classics (5 85532 2) 2003)
3	Sir Alexander Gibson	Royal Scottish National Orchestra	1977	5:44	Glasgow City Halls	Chandos	(Note: A. Gibson–Chandos (CHAN 8395/6) 1985)
4	Neeme Järvi	Gothenburg Symphony Orchestra	1985	5:41	Gothenburg Concert Hall	BIS	(Note: N. Järvi–BIS (CD–359) 1987)
5	Vassily Sinaisky	Moscow Philharmonic Orchestra	1991	5:43	Mosfilm Studios	Brilliant Classics	(Note: V. Sinaisky–Brilliant Classics (BC9212) 2010)
6	Shuntaro Sato	Kuopio Symphony Orchestra	2002	6:02	Kuopio Music Centre	Finlandia	(Note: S. Sato–Finlandia (0927–49598–2) 2003)
7	Osmo Vänskä	Lahti Symphony Orchestra	2000	5:07	Sibelius Hall	BIS	(Note: O. Vänskä–BIS (CD–1225) 2002)
8	Pietari Inkinen	New Zealand Symphony Orchestra	2007	5:46	Michael Fowler Centre	Naxos	(Note: P. Inkinen–Naxos (8.570763) 2008)

In addition, the Finnish pianist Erik T. Tawaststjerna made the world premiere studio recording of Sibelius's piano transcription of The Dryad in 1987 for BIS. The table below includes this and other commercially available recordings:

No.	Pianist	Rec. (Note: Refers to the year in which the performers recorded the work; this may not be the same as the year in which the recording was first released to the general public.)	Time	Recording venue	Label	Ref.
1	Erik T. Tawaststjerna	1987	5:45	Danderyd Grammar School	BIS	(Note: E. Tawaststjerna–BIS (CD–366) 1987)
2	Folke Gräsbeck	2007	5:10	Kuusankoski Hall	BIS	(Note: F. Gräsbeck–BIS (CD–1909/11) 2008)

== Notes, references, and sources ==
Notes

Sources

- Barnett, Andrew (2007). Sibelius. New Haven: Yale University Press. ISBN 978-0-300-11159-0.
- Dahlström, Fabian [in Swedish] (2003). Jean Sibelius: Thematisch-bibliographisches Verzeichnis seiner Werke [Jean Sibelius: A Thematic Bibliographic Index of His Works] (in German). Wiesbaden: Breitkopf & Härtel. ISBN 3-7651-0333-0.
- Siren, Visa. "Other orchestral works / The Dryad". Jean Sibelius. Finnish Club of Helsinki. Archived from the original on 4 March 2016.
