= Nils-Eric Fougstedt =

Finish direktor and composer

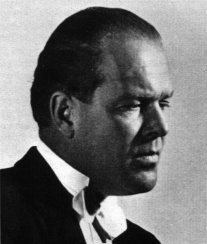
Nils-Eric Fougstedt.

Nils-Eric Fougstedt (24 May 1910 – 12 April 1961) was a Finnish conductor and composer.

Fougstedt was born in Turku, and attended the Helsinki Conservatory, where Erik Furuhjelm was one of his teachers. He joined the staff of the Finnish Broadcasting Company (YLE) in 1938, where he founded the organisation's Soloist Choir, which later became the Radio Choir. In 1944, he became the conductor of YLE's Radio Orchestra, and was elevated to Chief Conductor in 1950. He served in the post until his death in 1961.

Fougstedt taught music theory and choral conducting at the Sibelius Academy. He also was a member of the Swedish Royal Music Academy and received the honorary title of Professor in 1960. His compositions included Angoscia (1954), the first Finnish dodecaphonic orchestral work, Trittico sinfonico (1958), and Aurea dicta (1959).

He died in Helsinki and is buried in the Hietaniemi Cemetery there.

== Notes ==
Preceded by Toivo Haapanen	Chief Conductor, Finnish Radio Symphony Orchestra; 1950–1961	Succeeded by Paavo Berglund
