= Helsinki Music Centre =

Concert hall in Helsinki, Finland

- Finnish: Helsingin musiikkitalo Swedish: Musikhuset i Helsingfors
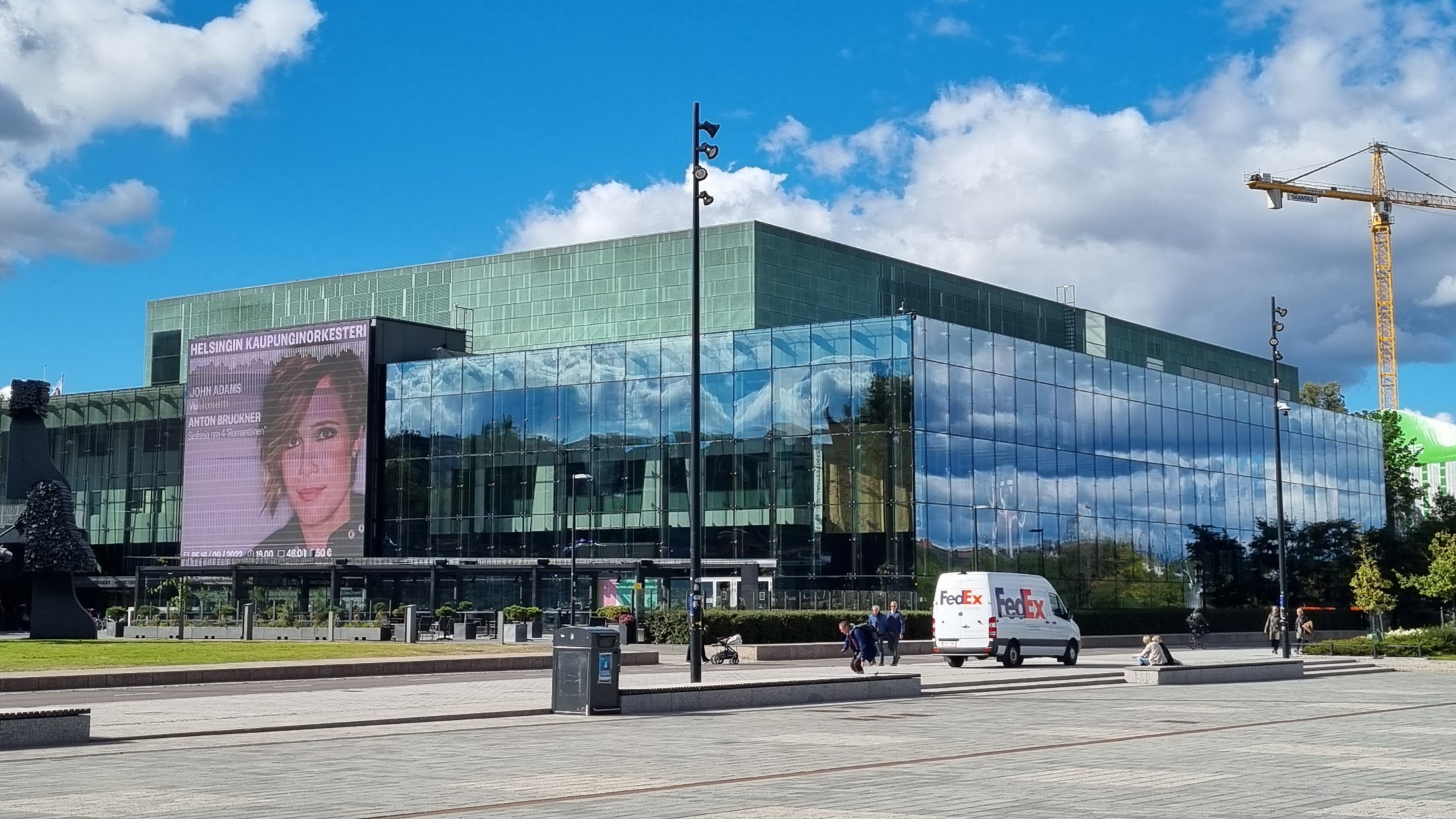
- Helsinki Music Centre in September 2022

General information
- Type: Concert Hall
- Location: Helsinki, Finland, Mannerheimintie 13 A
- Coordinates: 60°10′25″N 24°56′06″E
- Construction started: October 22, 2008
- Completed: April 2011
- Cost: 189 million euros (building 166 M€, equipment 23 M€)
- Client: Helsinki Philharmonic Orchestra; Finnish Radio Symphony Orchestra; Sibelius Academy
- Owner: Senate Properties; City of Helsinki; Yleisradio.

Technical details
- Floor area: 36,000 m^{2} (390,000 sq ft)

Design and construction
- Architects: Marko Kivistö, Ola Laiho and Mikko Pulkkinen
- Main contractor: SRV

The Helsinki Music Centre (Finnish: Helsingin musiikkitalo, Swedish: Musikhuset i Helsingfors) is a concert hall and a music center in Töölönlahti, Helsinki. The building is home to the Sibelius Academy and two symphony orchestras, the Finnish Radio Symphony Orchestra and the Helsinki Philharmonic Orchestra.

The Music Centre is located on a site in the centre of Helsinki between Finlandia Hall and the museum of contemporary art Kiasma, and across the street from the Parliament of Finland. The vineyard-type main concert hall seats 1,704 people. The building contains five smaller rooms for 140–400 listeners. These include a chamber music hall, a chamber opera hall, an organ hall, a 'black box' room for electrically amplified music and a rehearsal hall. The smaller rooms are used regularly by the students of Sibelius Academy for their training and student concerts.

== History ==
=== Planning ===
Classical musicians in Helsinki had desired a purpose-built concert hall at least since the hall of the University of Helsinki, where Jean Sibelius conducted some of his works, was damaged in World War II. Eventually Finlandia Hall, designed by Alvar Aalto, was completed in 1971 and it became one of the major venues for concerts, but the building was conceived as a mixed use conference centre and the acoustics of the main hall were never satisfactory. The Sibelius Academy expressed interest in a new concert hall in 1992, and formal planning started 1994 as the two major symphony orchestras of Helsinki, the Finnish Radio Symphony Orchestra and the Helsinki Philharmonic joined the project. A two-part architectural competition on the design was held in 1999 and 2000 for a site at Töölönlahti, opposite the Parliament House. The competition was won by the Turku-based LPR Architects, with then 30-year-old architect Marko Kivistö as chief designer.

Prior to the Music Centre, the former VR warehouses stood on the site. Various lively grassroots activities had sprung up around the warehouses, and the Music Centre plan drew voluminous criticism for proposing to tear down spontaneous urban culture and replace it with a costly building for institutionalized classical music. Helsinki City Council approved the Music Centre project in 2002. In 2007 the board of the Helsinki Music Centre approved a bid by the construction company SRV to build the centre.

=== Construction ===
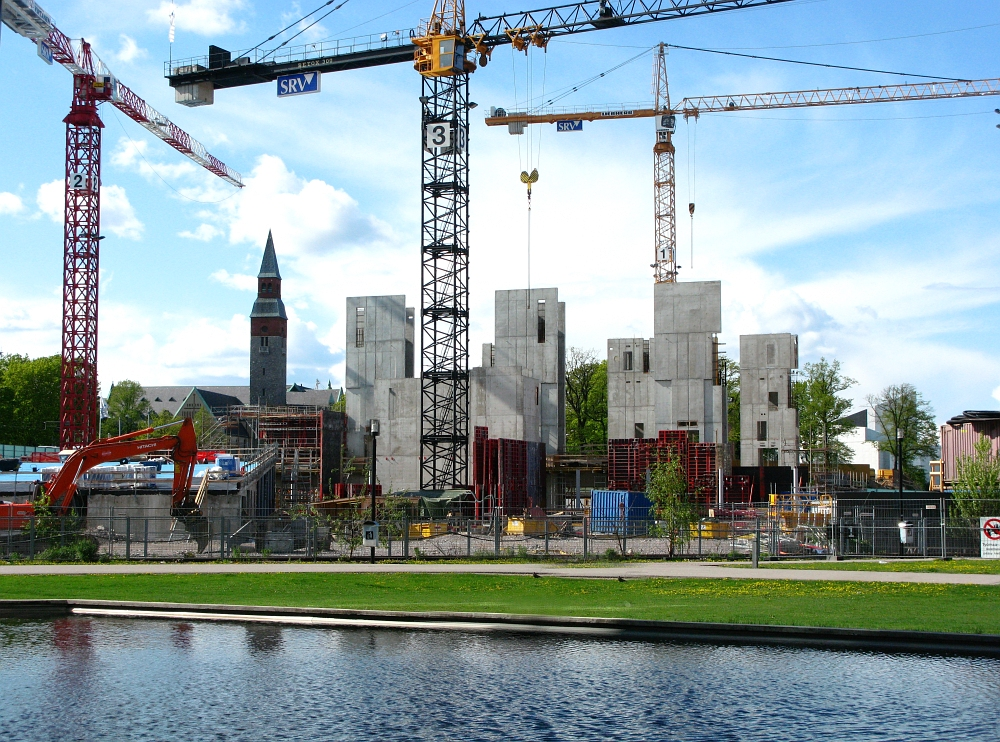
The construction site in May 2009

The foundation stone was laid on October 22, 2008. Minister of Finance Jyrki Katainen gave a speech at the event.

Before the formal completion of the building, the Finnish national broadcasting company YLE used it to host the election night broadcast for the 2011 Finnish parliamentary election on 17 April. YLE invited all party leaders to the still half-finished Music Centre for a live broadcast as the nation waited for the results to come in.

The completed building was formally approved and turned over to the owners at the end of April 2011. However, the formal opening ceremony and concert was held months later on 31 August 2011, which allowed time for the musicians to get accustomed to the new concert hall and for the builders to complete the landscaping around the building. The program of the opening concert included various performances by the students of Sibelius Academy, Sibelius's Tapiola and songs performed by the Helsinki Philharmonic (conductor John Storgårds) and soprano Soile Isokoski, Stravinsky's Rite of Spring performed by the Finnish Radio Symphony Orchestra (conductor Sakari Oramo), and Sibelius's Finlandia performed by a jointly by both orchestras and the choir of Sibelius Academy (conductor Jukka-Pekka Saraste).

The budget of approximately 160 million euros at the start of the construction was exceeded, the final cost standing at 189 million, including technical equipment. The expenditure was criticized in public debate, but the cost of the building was quite measured compared to e.g. a similar concert hall in Copenhagen built around the same time, or even the per-square-metre cost of new housing in Helsinki.

Before The Helsinki Music Centre opened its doors it was already used as a movie set for two major film productions: American thriller, Rage: Midsummer's Eve, directed by American-Finnish female director, Ms. Tii Ricks and based completely in Finland, used the interiors of the newly established Music Centre as a setting for a University where the main characters are studying. Mika Kaurismäki also used the Music Centre as a location for his upcoming film Road to the North.

== Acoustics ==
The acoustics consultant for the building was Yasuhisa Toyota. The acoustics of the main concert hall have received uniform praise in initial estimations by the conductors and musicians of the two symphony orchestras.

== Architecture ==
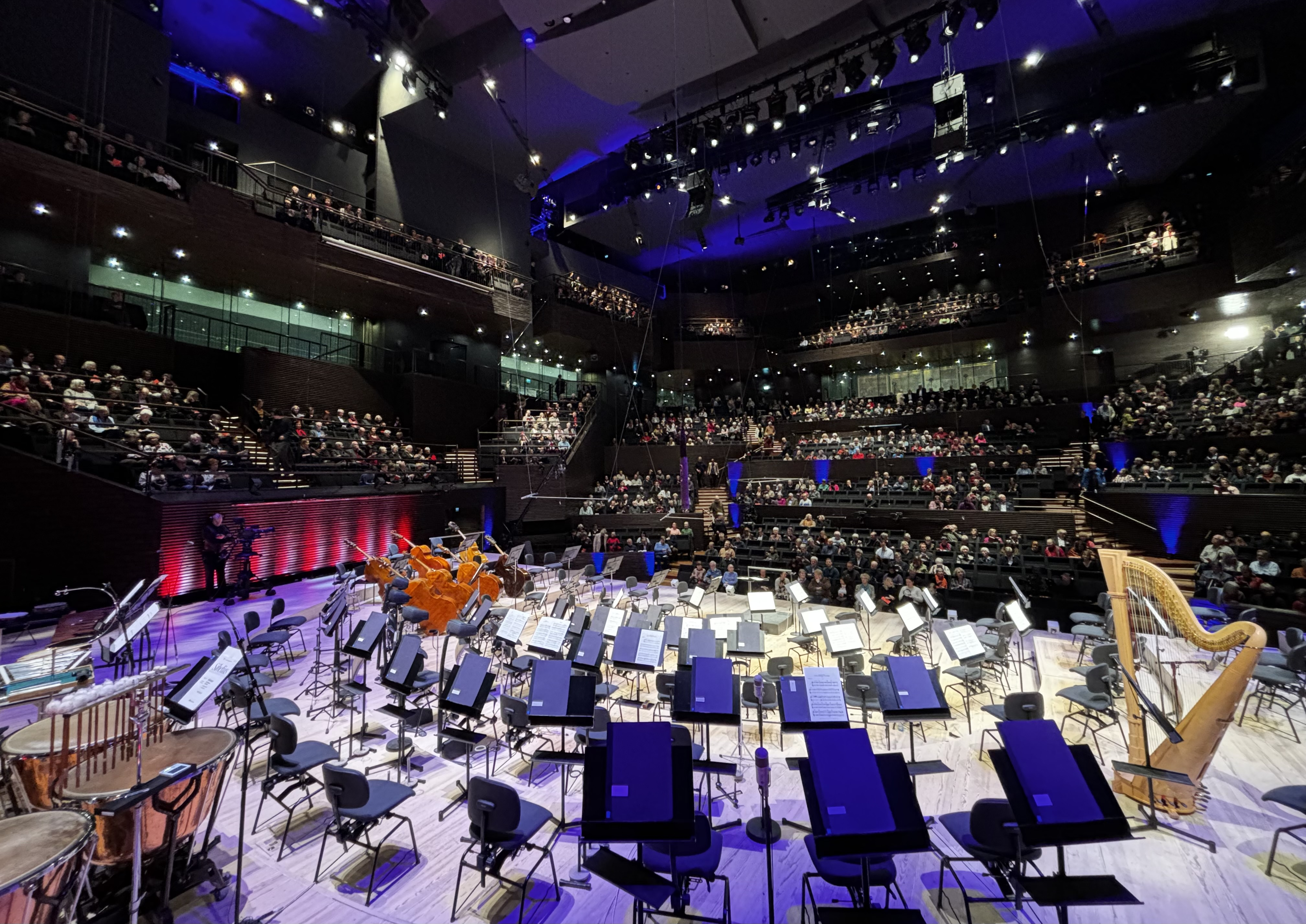
The main Concert Hall of the centre

The site is highly challenging from a design standpoint, as all of the neighboring buildings are architectural landmarks of central national importance in Finland, and they represent a wide range of different architectural styles and periods. The winning entry in the architecture competition by LPR Architects was titled "A Mezza Voce", referring to an understated building that aims to unify the surroundings, as opposed to competing with them with a grand architectural gesture. A large part of the Music Centre's considerable volume is placed underground in order to keep the roof of the building in line with its neighbors. A wide, sloping, landscaped terrace covers the underground structure and forms a part of an open park in front of the Parliament House. The large glass-walled foyer opens to the park. Unconventionally, the walls of the main concert hall are partly glass at the foyer level, allowing daylight from the foyer into the concert hall itself. The glass walls can be closed with curtains located in between the glass elements if daylight is not desired during a performance. Chief architect Marko Kivistö has stated that the forms of the outside are deliberately simple, leaving the building to reveal a more varied and dramatic interior. The green color of the copper facade is designed to connect the building with the surrounding lawns and parks. The building aims to provide a frame for, and a new view at, the more expressive curved shape of the museum of contemporary art, Kiasma, which stands across the park from the Centre.

== See also ==
- Finlandia Hall
- Sibelius Hall
- Copenhagen Concert Hall
