= Pierre Bartholomée =

Belgian conductor and composer

Pierre Georges Édouard Bartholomée (Brussels, 5 August 1937) is a Belgian conductor and composer.

== Career ==
He began his musical studies at the age of six with piano lessons. Later on he graduated from the Royal Conservatory of Brussels, where he received a piano education by André Dumortier and where he won several prizes. His education was completed with a series of Beethoven piano performance classes given by Wilhelm Kempff.

Together with Henri Pousseur, he founded the Ensemble Musique Nouvelles and the Centre de Recherches et de Création Musicales de Wallonie. He has performed internationally as a pianist and a conductor.

== Honours ==
- 1999 : created Knight Bartholomée, by king Albert II.
- 2004 : Member of the Royal Academy of Science, Letters and Fine Arts of Belgium.
- 2011 : President of the Royal Academy of Science, Letters and Fine Arts of Belgium.
- Officer of the Order of the Crown.
- Knight of the Ordre national du Mérite.
