= Helsinki Philharmonic Orchestra =

Symphony orchestra based in Helsinki, Finland

- Symphony orchestra
- Native name: Helsingin kaupunginorkesteri Helsingfors stadsorkester
- Founded: 1882; 144 years ago
- Location: Helsinki, Finland
- Concert hall: Helsinki Music Centre
- Principal conductor: Jukka-Pekka Saraste
- Website: Official website

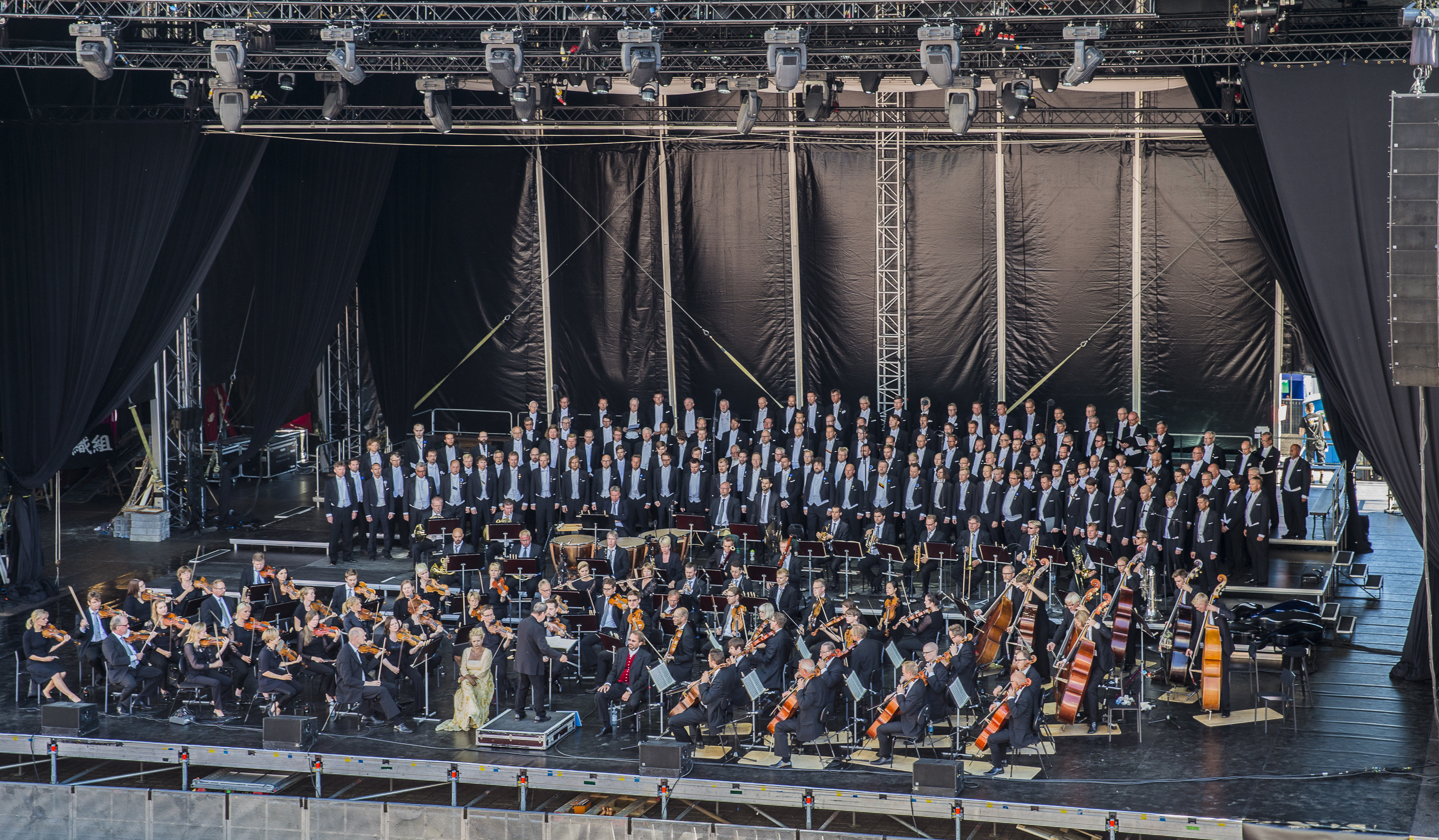
The Helsinki Philharmonic Orchestra performs in 2015

The Helsinki Philharmonic Orchestra (Finnish: Helsingin kaupunginorkesteri; Swedish: Helsingfors stadsorkester; literal English translation: Helsinki City Orchestra; commonly abbreviated as HPO) is an orchestra based in Helsinki, Finland. Founded in 1882 by Robert Kajanus, the Philharmonic Orchestra was the first permanent orchestra in the Nordic countries. Today, its primary concert venue is the Helsinki Music Centre; the current chief conductor is Jukka-Pekka Saraste, who has held his post since the start of the 2023–24 season.

== History ==
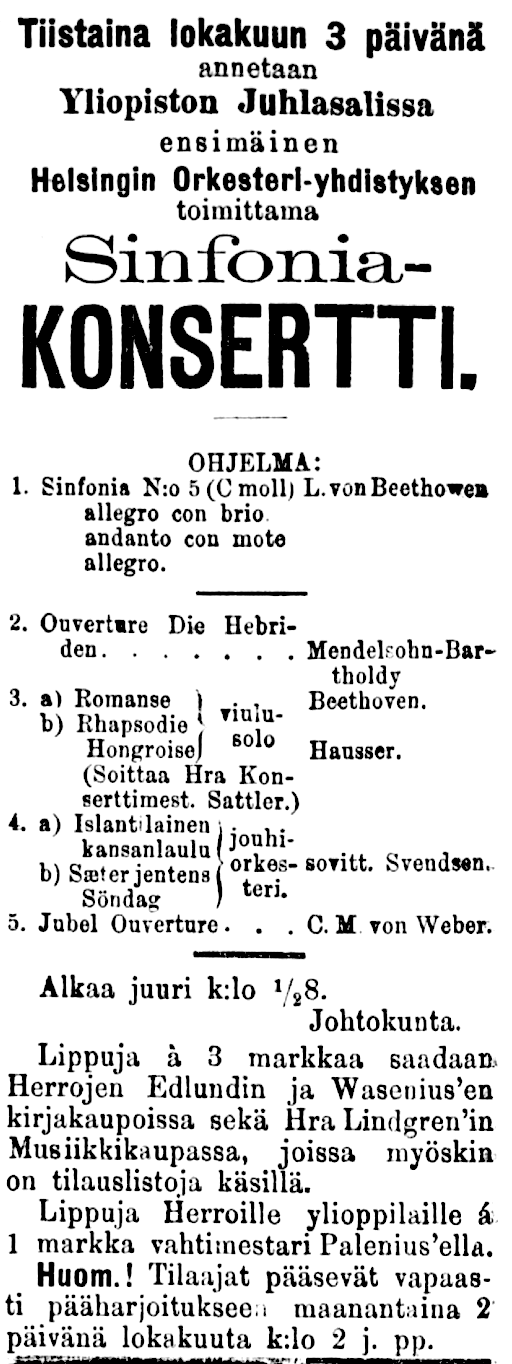
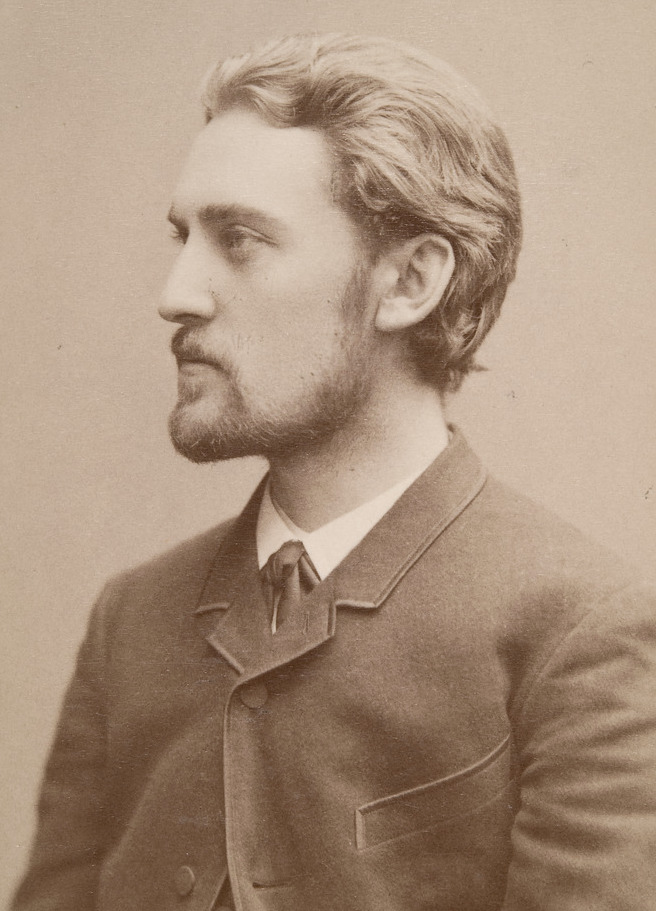
Robert Kajanus founded the Helsinki Orchestral Association in 1882; its inaugural concert was on 3 October of the same year.

=== Early history ===
In 1882, with the backing of two wealthy businessmen (Waldemar Klärich and Nikolai Sinebrychoff), the Finnish composer and conductor Robert Kajanus founded the Helsinki Orchestral Association (in Finnish: Helsingin Orkesteriyhdistys; in Swedish: Helsingfors Orkesterförening), (Note: When referring to the orchestra's name from 1882 to early 1894, sources will often utilize an alternative translation: the Helsinki Orchestral Society or, similarly, the Helsinki Orchestra Society. However, the website of the Helsinki Philharmonic Orchestra translates its early name as Orchestral Association, which is the term used for this article.) the first permanent orchestra in the Nordic countries. Kajanus, who took no salary in the first year, conducted the Orchestral Association in its inaugural concert, on 3 October 1882; the program included, among other pieces, Beethoven's Symphony No. 5 in C minor, Mendelssohn's concert overture The Hebrides, and Weber's overture Jubel in E major. The orchestra comprised musicians from Imperial Germany and Imperial Russia, and sensing a need to guarantee the Orchestral Association a supply of domestically-trained musicians, Kajanus on 1 October 1885 founded an attendant music school; initially, the music school employed as its instructors the very foreign musicians it sought, in time, to replace with Finns. (Note: Kajanus's foray into the realm of education created friction with his rival Martin Wegelius, who had founded Helsinki Music Institute (now the Sibelius Academy) in 1882 and was protective of his turf.) In the summer of 1894, the Orchestral Association—worried that its name implied amateurism—renamed itself the Helsinki Philharmonic Society (in Finnish: Helsingin Filharmoninen Seura; in Swedish: Helsingfors Filharmoniska Sällskap); at the same meeting, it changed its rules to allow female students to enroll in the orchestra's music school, although de facto discrimination continued.

In 1912, the Finnish conductor Georg Schnéevoigt—who had served as the principal cellist of the Philharmonic Society from 1895 to 1912 and taught cello at the orchestra school from 1896 to 1902—founded the Helsinki Symphony Orchestra (in Finnish: Helsingin sinfoniaorkesteri; in Swedish: Helsingfors symfoniorkester). A bitter "feud" between the two competing organizations ensued: with 150,000 residents, Helsinki could not sustain rival orchestras, especially with the Swedish-speaking patrons supporting Schnéevoigt and the Finnish-speakers backing Kajanus. The city recognized the situation was unsustainable, and although each group proposed initially that the other should disband, the two merged and municipalized in 1914 under a new name, the Helsinki Philharmonic Orchestra (literally, the Helsinki City Orchestra). In part, the resolution was due to the dawn of the First World War in July 1914: the Helsinki Symphony Orchestra collapsed after the German musicians who formed its backbone were expelled from the country; Kajanus and Schnéevoigt initially co-served as chief conductors of the Philharmonic Orchestra, which then consisted of forty players surviving on starvation wages. (Note: In 1912, Kajanus had hired the Finnish composers Leevi Madetoja and Toivo Kuula to serve as assistant conductors; however, the merger of the Helsinki Philharmonic Society with Schnéevoigh's Helsinki Symphony Orchestra rendered Madetoja and Kuula superfluous, and each was let go.) During this time, the Philharmonic Orchestra struggled to survive: not only did Kajanus and Schnéevoigt quarrel with each other through the press, but also there were not—despite the orchestral school having been open for decades—enough Finnish musicians to supply the orchestra; in response, Kajanus sought to recruit musicians from neutral countries such as Denmark and the Netherlands. (Note: When the Helsinki Philharmonic Society and the Helsinki Symphony Orchestra merged in 1914, Kajanus's music school closed and its students transferred to the Helsinki Music Institute.) In 1916, Schnéevoigt left the Philharmonic Orchestra to assume the chief conductorship of the Stockholm Concert Society Orchestra (in Swedish: Stockholms Konsertförenings Orkester).

Until 1962, it also served as the orchestra for the Finnish National Opera.

=== Modern era ===
Leif Segerstam was chief conductor of the orchestra from 1995 to 2007, and is now its chief conductor emeritus. John Storgårds became principal guest conductor of the orchestra in 2003, and took up the chief conductorship of the orchestra in the autumn of 2008, with an initial contract of 4 years. Following an initial renewal of his contract through 2014., in October 2013, the orchestra announced a further extension of Storgårds' contract through December 2015, at which time he stood down as chief conductor. In September 2014, the orchestra announced the appointment of Susanna Mälkki as its next chief conductor, effective with the 2016–2017 season, with an initial contract of 3 years. She is the first female conductor to be named to the post in the orchestra's history. In October 2017, the orchestra announced the extension of Mälkki's contract as chief conductor through 2021. In June 2019, the orchestra announced a further extension of her contract as chief conductor through 2023, with an option for a further 2-year extension past 2023. In December 2021, the orchestra announced that Mälkki is to stand down as its chief conductor at the end of the 2022–2023 season, and subsequently to take the title of chief conductor emeritus with the orchestra. In April 2022, the orchestra announced the appointments of Jukka-Pekka Saraste as its next chief conductor, Pekka Kuusisto as its next principal guest conductor, and Anna Clyne as its composer-in-residence, all effective with the 2023–2024 season.

The orchestra has recorded commercially for such labels as Ondine and Finlandia, as well as a smaller number for the EMI, Warner and Deutsche Grammophon labels. In November 2011, the orchestra was the first ensemble to perform reported sketches for the Symphony No. 8 of Jean Sibelius.

== Chief conductors ==
- Robert Kajanus (1882–1932)
- Georg Schnéevoigt (1914–1916; 1932–1940)
- Armas Järnefelt (1942–1943)
- Martti Similä (1945–1951)
- Tauno Hannikainen (1951–1963)
- Jorma Panula (1965–1972)
- Paavo Berglund (1975–1979)
- Ulf Söderblom (1978–1979)
- Okko Kamu (1981–1988)
- Sergiu Comissiona (1990–1993)
- Leif Segerstam (1995–2007)
- John Storgårds (2008–2015)
- Susanna Mälkki (2016–2023)
- Jukka-Pekka Saraste (2023–present)
