= Jukka-Pekka Saraste =

Finnish conductor and violinist (born 1956)

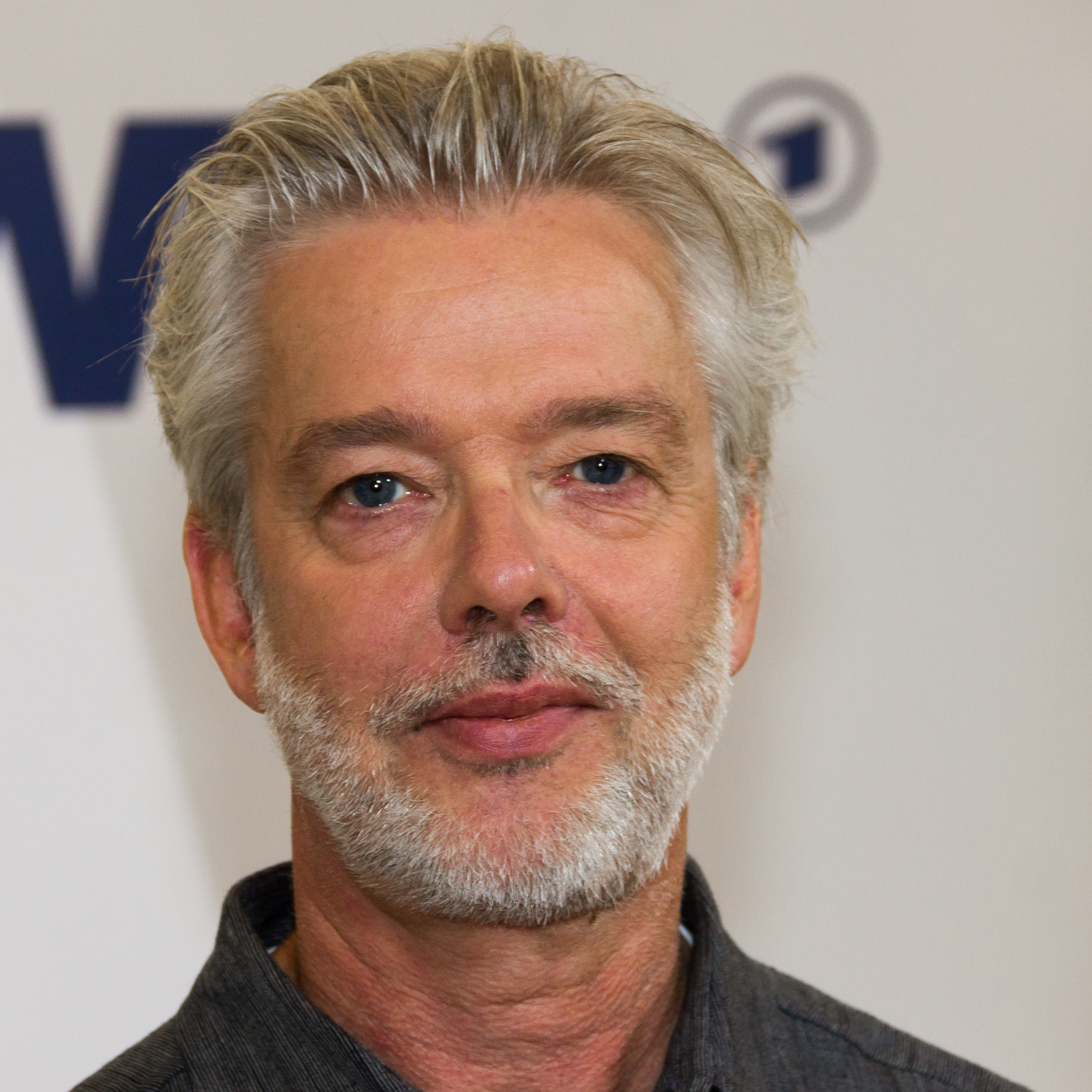
- Jukka-Pekka Saraste in 2014
- Born: 22 April 1956 (age 70); Heinola, Finland
- Education: Lahti Conservatory of Music; Sibelius Academy
- Occupations: Classical violinist; Conductor
- Organizations: Finnish Radio Symphony Orchestra; Finnish Chamber Orchestra; Toronto Symphony Orchestra; WDR Symphony Orchestra Cologne; Helsinki Philharmonic Orchestra
- Spouse: Sarah Osa (since 2014) Marja-Liisa Ollila (since 1986)
- Parent(s): Kauko Pekka Saraste, Ritva Leena-Marjatta (Ruoranen) Saraste
- Website: jukkapekkasaraste.com

Jukka-Pekka Saraste (born 22 April 1956) is a Finnish conductor and violinist.

== Biography ==
Saraste was born in Heinola, the son of teachers Kauko Pekka Saraste and Ritva Leena-Marjatta (Ruoranen) Saraste. He was trained as a violinist at the Conservatory of Music in Lahti (Lahden Musiikkiopisto) and later studied conducting at the Sibelius Academy with Jorma Panula in the same class as Esa-Pekka Salonen and Osmo Vänskä. Before becoming a conductor, Saraste was co-principal second violinist and later an associate to Leif Segerstam, with the Finnish Radio Symphony Orchestra (RSO).

In 1983, Esa-Pekka Salonen and Saraste co-founded the Avanti! Chamber Orchestra, which specialises in performances of contemporary music. In 2000, Saraste also founded the Ekenäs Summer Concerts-Festival with the Finnish Chamber Orchestra, and he is currently the artistic advisor to both festival and orchestra. Saraste has directed the Finnish Chamber Orchestra on several tours, including tours in the United States and China.

In 1987, Saraste became the chief conductor of the RSO, and held the position until 2001. In 1987, he also became the principal conductor of the Scottish Chamber Orchestra and remained with the orchestra until 1991. Saraste now holds the title of Conductor Laureate of the RSO. He has twice recorded the complete symphonies of Jean Sibelius with the RSO.

Saraste became music director of the Toronto Symphony Orchestra in 1994. The later years of his tenure were marked by strife over the orchestra's financial difficulties, several musicians' strikes, and his unsuccessful efforts to improve the acoustics at Roy Thomson Hall. During the 1999 labour dispute, Saraste had offered to serve as mediator in the situation. Saraste stepped down from his Toronto post in 2001.

From 2002 to 2005, Saraste served as the principal guest conductor of the BBC Symphony Orchestra. In August 2006, he became music director of the Oslo Philharmonic, with an initial contract of 5 years. In June 2009, his Oslo contract was extended through the 2012–2013 season. He concluded his Oslo tenure after the 2012–2013 season. In December 2006, the Lahti Symphony Orchestra announced the appointment of Saraste as its artistic advisor from 2008 through 2011, and artistic director of the Lahti Sibelius Festival in 2008. In November 2008, the WDR Symphony Orchestra Cologne announced the appointment of Saraste as its next principal conductor, effective with the 2010–2011 season. He served in the post through the 2018–2019 season. In April 2022, the Helsinki Philharmonic Orchestra announced the appointment of Saraste as its next chief conductor, effective with the 2023–2024 season, with an initial contract of 3 years.

Saraste was awarded the Finnish State Prize for Music in 2000. He has received a Doctor honoris causa from York University (Toronto), and he is a Sibelius Medallist. Other honours also include the Sibelius Prize, awarded in Norway and the Pro Finlandia Medal. He received the Insignia of Commander of the Order of the Lion of Finland in 2023.

Cultural offices
Preceded by Roderick Brydon	Principal Conductor, Scottish Chamber Orchestra; 1987–1991	Succeeded by Ivor Bolton
Preceded by Leif Segerstam	Principal Conductor, Finnish Radio Symphony Orchestra; 1987–2001	Succeeded by Sakari Oramo
Preceded by Semyon Bychkov	Principal Conductor, WDR Symphony Orchestra Cologne; 2010–2019	Succeeded by Cristian Măcelaru
Preceded by Susanna Mälkki	Chief Conductor, Helsinki Philharmonic Orchestra; 2023–present	Succeeded by incumbent
