= Finnish Radio Symphony Orchestra =

Orchestra of Finnish Broadcasting Company

- Radio orchestra of Yle
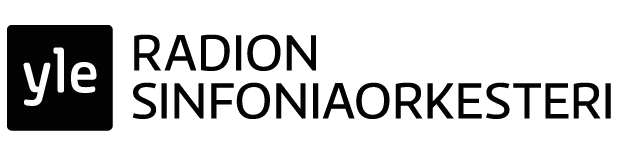
- Native name: Radion sinfoniaorkesteri Radions symfoniorkester
- Founded: 1927; 99 years ago
- Location: Helsinki, Finland
- Concert hall: Helsinki Music Centre
- Principal conductor: Nicholas Collon
- Website: Official website

The Finnish Radio Symphony Orchestra (Finnish: Radion sinfoniaorkesteri, Swedish: Radions symfoniorkester; abbreviated as RSO) is a Finnish broadcast orchestra based in Helsinki, and the orchestra of the Finnish public broadcaster Yle. The orchestra primarily gives concerts at the Helsinki Music Centre. Primary funding comes from television licence fees from the Finnish population.

== History ==
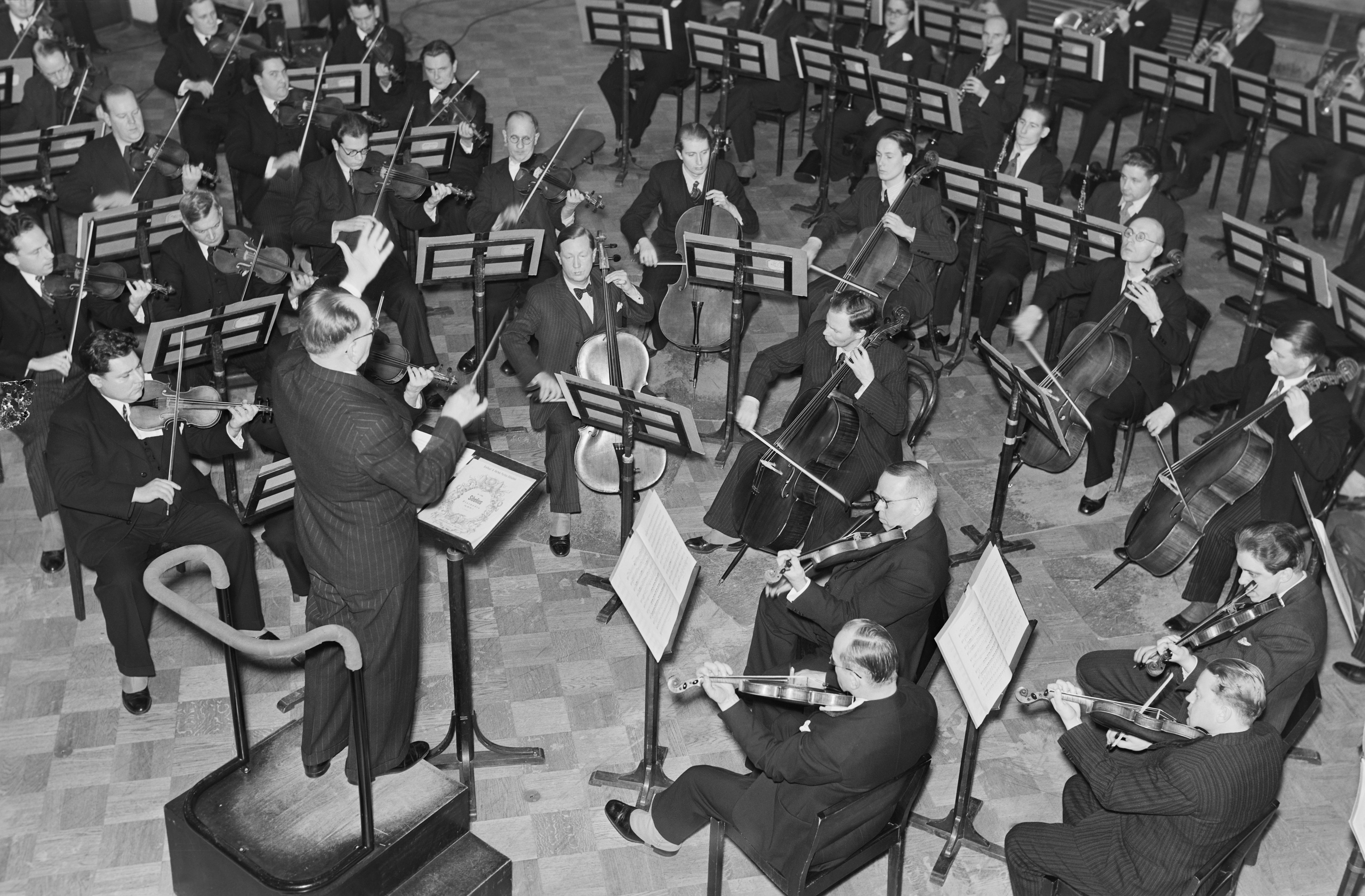
The orchestra in 1939

The ensemble was founded in 1927 as the Radio Orchestra with ten musicians, with Erkki Linko as its first conductor. Though never holding the title of chief conductor, Linko remained affiliated with the orchestra until 1952. Toivo Haapanen became the orchestra's first chief conductor in 1929 and held the post until his death in 1950. The orchestra performed mainly studio concerts for the first portion of its history. Until World War II, the orchestra gave only 20 public concerts, with freelance musicians to bolster the ranks.

After World War II, with the new Director General Hella Wuolijoki in place, the orchestra roster expanded to 50 musicians. In September 1947, the orchestra initiated a series of "Tuesday Concerts" at Helsinki Town Hall. The roster grew to 67 musicians by 1953. The orchestra's second chief conductor, Nils-Eric Fougstedt, served from 1950 until his death in 1961, and expanded the orchestra's repertoire. The third chief conductor, Paavo Berglund, had been a violinist in the orchestra 10 years prior to his 1961 accession to the chief conductorship. The ensemble had grown to 90 members in the 1970s, into a full symphony orchestra.

Jukka-Pekka Saraste, chief conductor from 1987 to 2001, is now the orchestra's honorary conductor. Sakari Oramo was chief conductor from 2003 to 2012, having earlier been concertmaster (leader) of the orchestra. In December 2010, the orchestra announced the appointment of Hannu Lintu as its eighth chief conductor, as of the 2013–2014 season, with an initial contract of 3 years. Lintu held the title of principal guest conductor during the 2012–2013 season. In April 2016, the FRSO announced the extension of Lintu's contract as chief conductor through 2021. In April 2019, the FRSO announced that Lintu is to conclude his chief conductorship of the orchestra at the close of the 2020–2021 season.

In 2017, Nicholas Collon first guest-conducted the FRSO. In May 2019, the FRSO announced the appointment of Collon as its next chief conductor, effective with the 2021–2022 season. He is the first non-Finnish conductor to be named chief conductor of the FRSO. In February 2023, the FRSO announced the extension of Collon's contract as its chief conductor through the 2027–2028 season.

The orchestra's discography includes, besides the music of Jean Sibelius, music by other Finnish composers such as Paavo Heininen, Joonas Kokkonen, Magnus Lindberg and Aarre Merikanto. They have also recorded repertoire by non-Finnish composers, such as symphonies of Gustav Mahler and Carl Nielsen, and music of Béla Bartók.

== Chief conductors ==
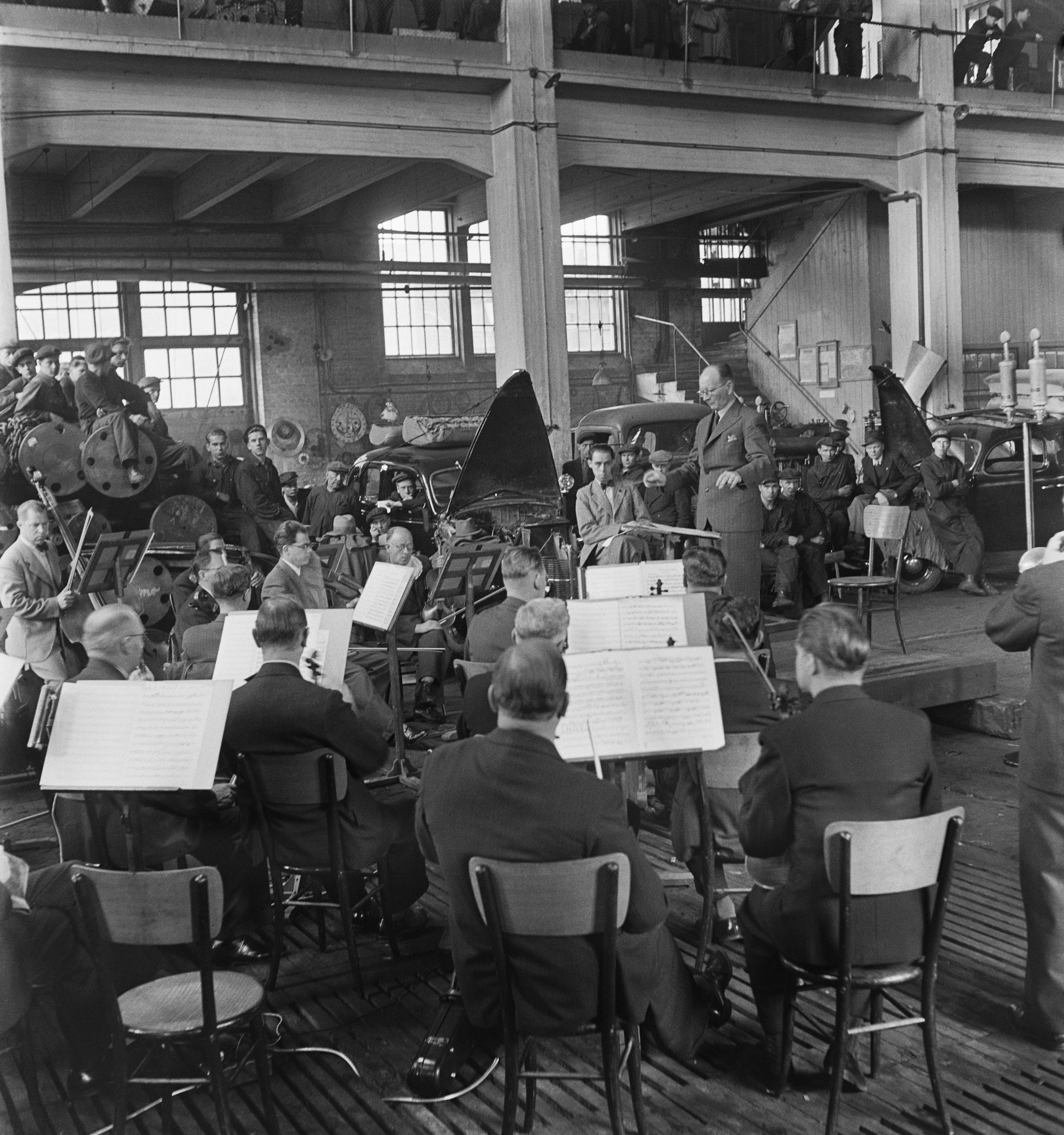
Toivo Haapanen conducting the orchestra at the Wärtsilä Hietalahti shipyard in Helsinki, 1945

- Toivo Haapanen (1929–1950)
- Nils-Eric Fougstedt (1950–1961)
- Paavo Berglund (1962–1971)
- Okko Kamu (1971–1977)
- Leif Segerstam (1977–1987)
- Jukka-Pekka Saraste (1987–2001)
- Sakari Oramo (2003–2012)
- Hannu Lintu (2013–2021)
- Nicholas Collon (2021–present)

== See also ==
- Radio orchestra
- Category:Music commissioned by the Finnish Radio Symphony Orchestra (6)
