= Marjatta (Sibelius) =

Abandoned oratorio by Jean Sibelius

- Abandoned oratorio by Jean Sibelius
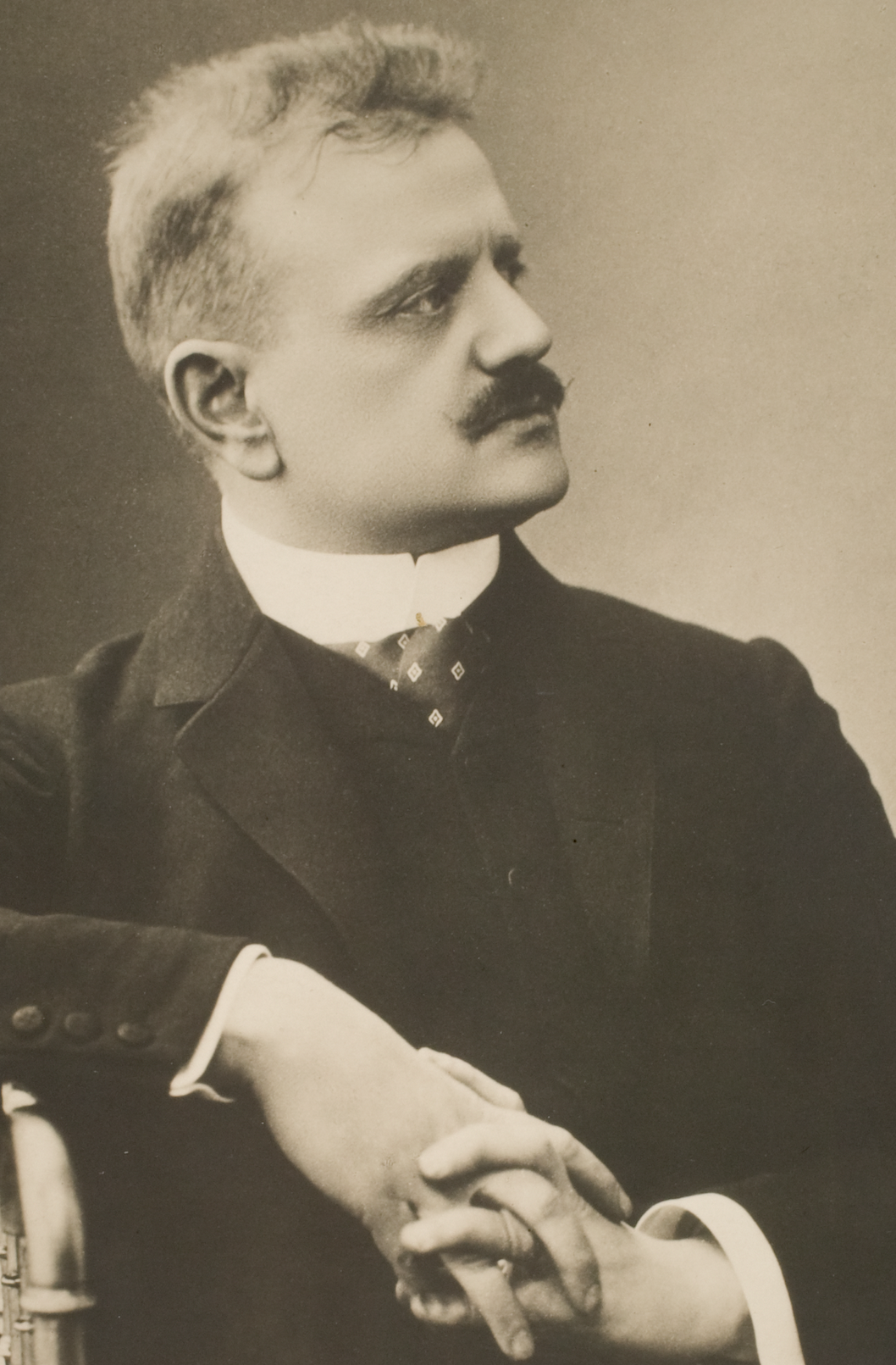
- The composer (c. 1905)
- English: The Virgin Mary
- Catalogue: None
- Text: Kalevala (Runo L); Libretto with Jalmari Finne
- Language: Finnish
- Composed: 27 June to late-Oct. 1905; (abandoned, material reused)

Marjatta (in English: The Virgin Mary) was a projected three-movement oratorio for soloists, choir, and orchestra that occupied the Finnish composer Jean Sibelius from 27 June to late-October 1905, at which point he abandoned the project. The libretto, a collaboration with the Finnish author Jalmari Finne, freely adapted the story of Kiesus's miraculous birth to Marjatta from Runo L of the Kalevala, Finland's national epic. Although Sibelius initially worked on the oratorio with alacrity, he soon soured on the project, perhaps finding Finne's text an unwelcome constraint on his "absolute music". Sibelius never again attempted an oratorio, making it one of the few major genres of classical music in which he did not produce a viable work.

As with other aborted projects—for example, the Wagnerian opera The Building of the Boat (Veneen luominen, 1893–1894) and the orchestral song The Raven (Der Rabe, 1910) (Note: The Finnish musicologist Fabian Dahlström does not, in his authoritative supplementary JS numbering system, provide The Building of the Boat, Marjatta, and The Raven with catalogue designations. This is in contrast to Sibelius's most notorious abandoned project, the Eighth Symphony (mid 1920s–c. late 1930s–1945), which Dahlström labels JS 190. Dahlström finalized his list in 2003 with the publication of Jean Sibelius: A Thematic Bibliographic Index of His Works. It runs from JS 1 to 225 and includes not only compositions Sibelius demoted from his opus list but also those that never held an opus number at any point during his career.)—Sibelius did not discard, but rather repurposed, the fruits of his labor. In this case, he incorporated material from Marjatta into several subsequent compositions, most conclusively: the Third Symphony (Op. 52, 1907); a never-realized Kalevala-themed tone poem on the subject of Luonnotar, (Note: The abandoned 'Luonnotar' tone poem from 1906 is not to be confused with the thematically-distinct Luonnotar (Op. 70), for soprano and orchestra, which arrived in 1913.) which in 1906 evolved into Pohjola's Daughter (Op. 49); and the second movement of Scènes historiques II (Op. 66, 1912).

== Composition and abandonment ==
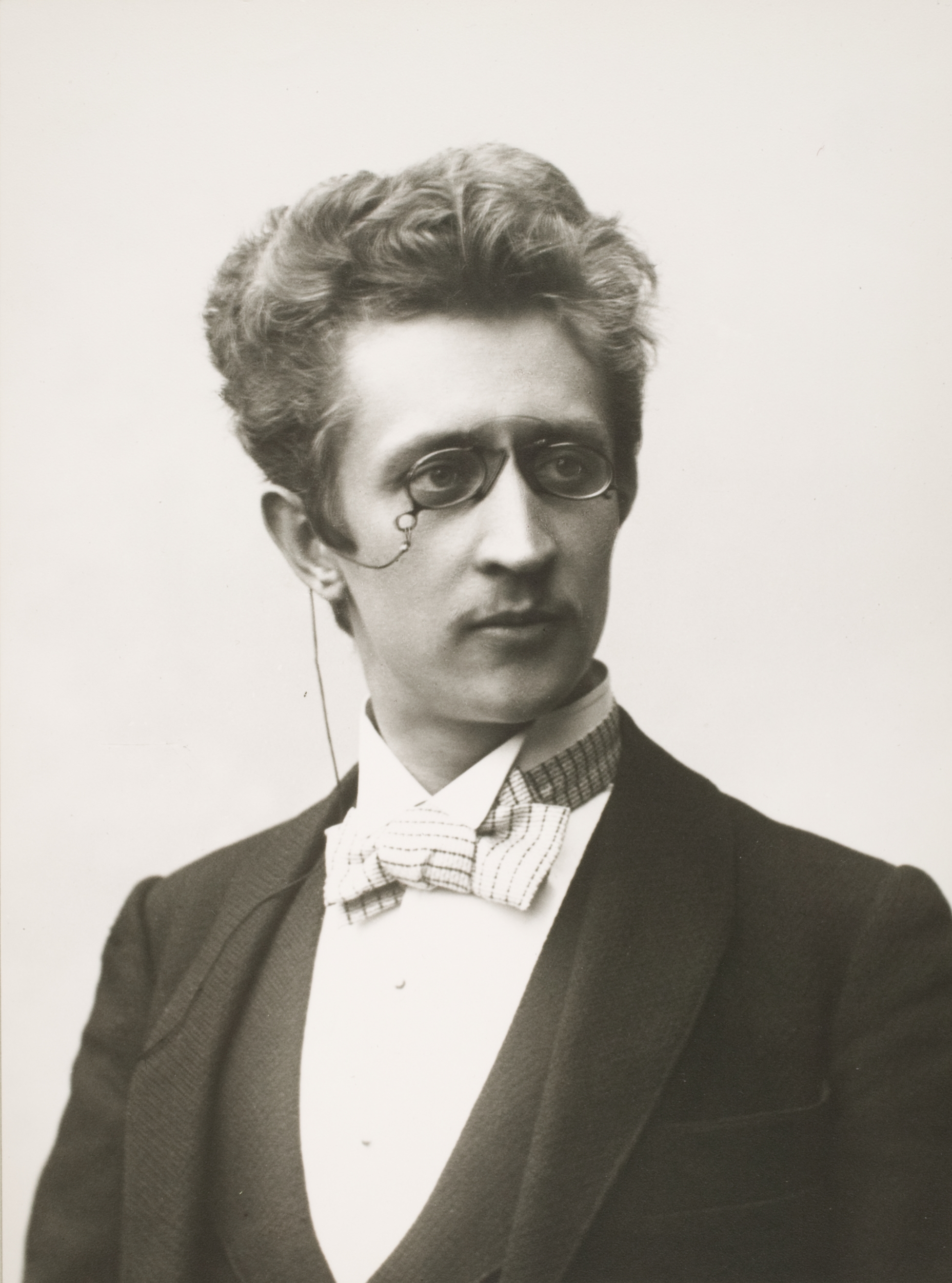
In 1905, Jalmari Finne sought to collaborate with Sibelius on an oratorio.

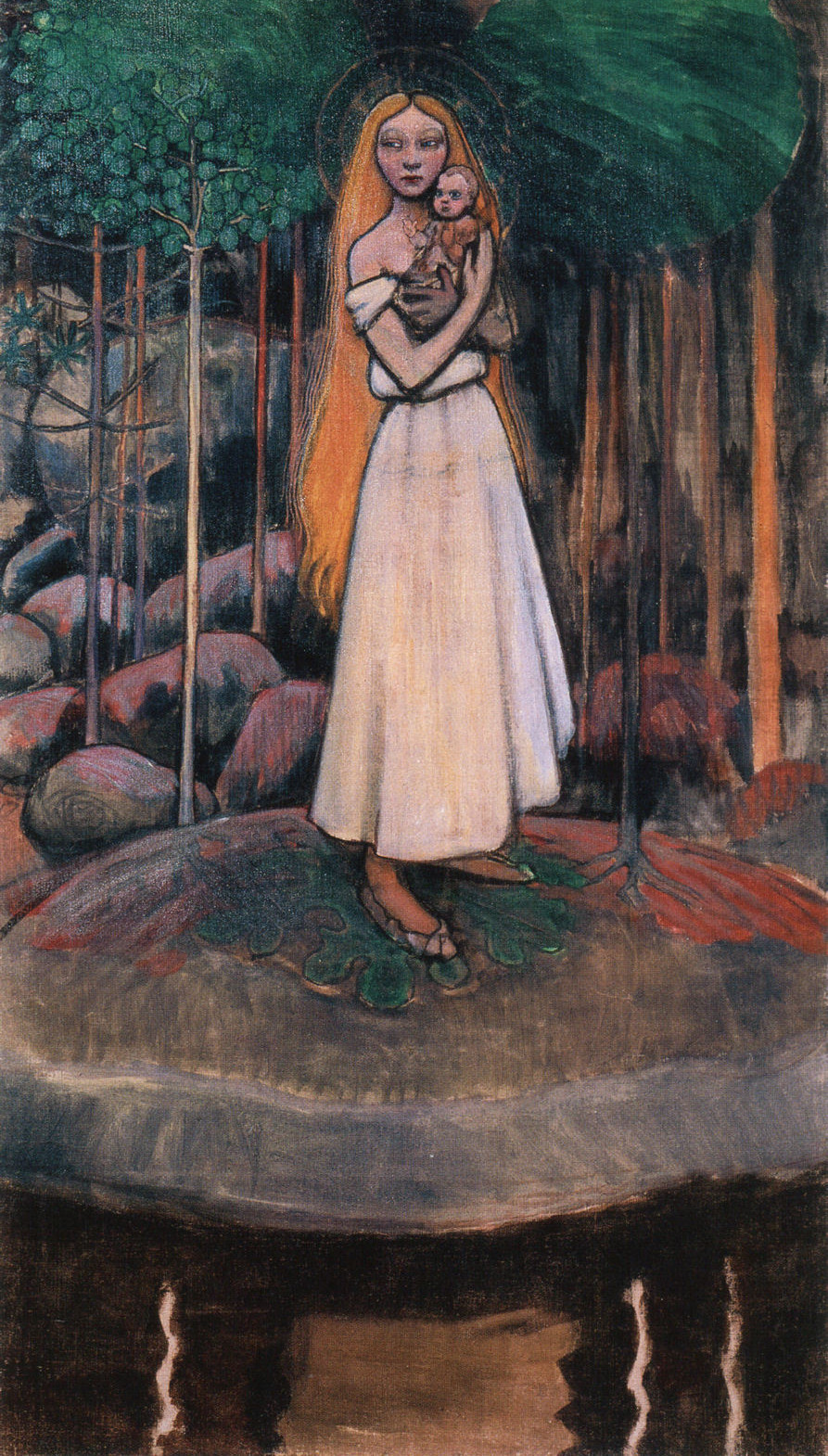
Marjatta's miraculous birth of Kiesus brings about the end of Finnish paganism.

1. The Birth of Christ (Kristuksen syntymä), 64 lines
2. Burial (Hautaus), 116 lines
3. Resurrection (Ylösnouseminen), 85 lines

Sibelius began working on the Marjatta oratorio in 1905, but soon abandoned his plans the same year, likely due to a waning enthusiasm for Finne's libretto (based on the Kalevala's biblically inspired Runo L); the second movement (Love Song) of 1912's Scènes historiques II (Op. 66); and, possibly, 1905's Not with Lamentation (Ej med klagan, JS 69), for mixed choir a cappella; 1909's In memoriam (Op. 59); and 1922's Andante festivo (JS 34a).

== Notes, references, and sources ==
Notes

Sources

- Barnett, Andrew (2007). Sibelius. New Haven: Yale University Press. ISBN 978-0-300-11159-0.
- Dahlström, Fabian [in Swedish] (2003). Jean Sibelius: Thematisch-bibliographisches Verzeichnis seiner Werke [Jean Sibelius: A Thematic Bibliographic Index of His Works] (in German). Wiesbaden: Breitkopf & Härtel. ISBN 3-7651-0333-0.
- Goss, Glenda Dawn (2009). Sibelius: A Composer's Life and the Awakening of Finland. Chicago: University of Chicago Press. ISBN 978-0-226-00547-8.
- Magoun, Jr., Francis Peabody, ed. (1963). The Kalevala: Or Poems of the Kaleva District. Cambridge, Massachusetts: Harvard University Press. ISBN 9780674500105.
- Tawaststjerna, Erik (2008a) [1965/1967; trans. 1976]. Sibelius: Volume I, 1865–1905. Translated by Layton, Robert. London: Faber and Faber. ISBN 978-0-571-24772-1.
- Virtanen, Timo (2010). "Sibelius's "Resurrection Symphony"?: The Third Symphony and the "Marjatta" Oratorio". In Jackson, Timothy; Murtomäki, Veijo [in Finnish]; Davis, Colin; Virtanen, Timo (eds.). In Sibelius in the Old and New World: Aspects of His Music, Its Interpretation, and Reception. Frankfurt am Main: Peter Lang. pp. 319–331. ISBN 978-3-631-56025-9.
