= The Raven (Sibelius) =

Abandoned orchestral song by Jean Sibelius

- Abandoned song by Jean Sibelius
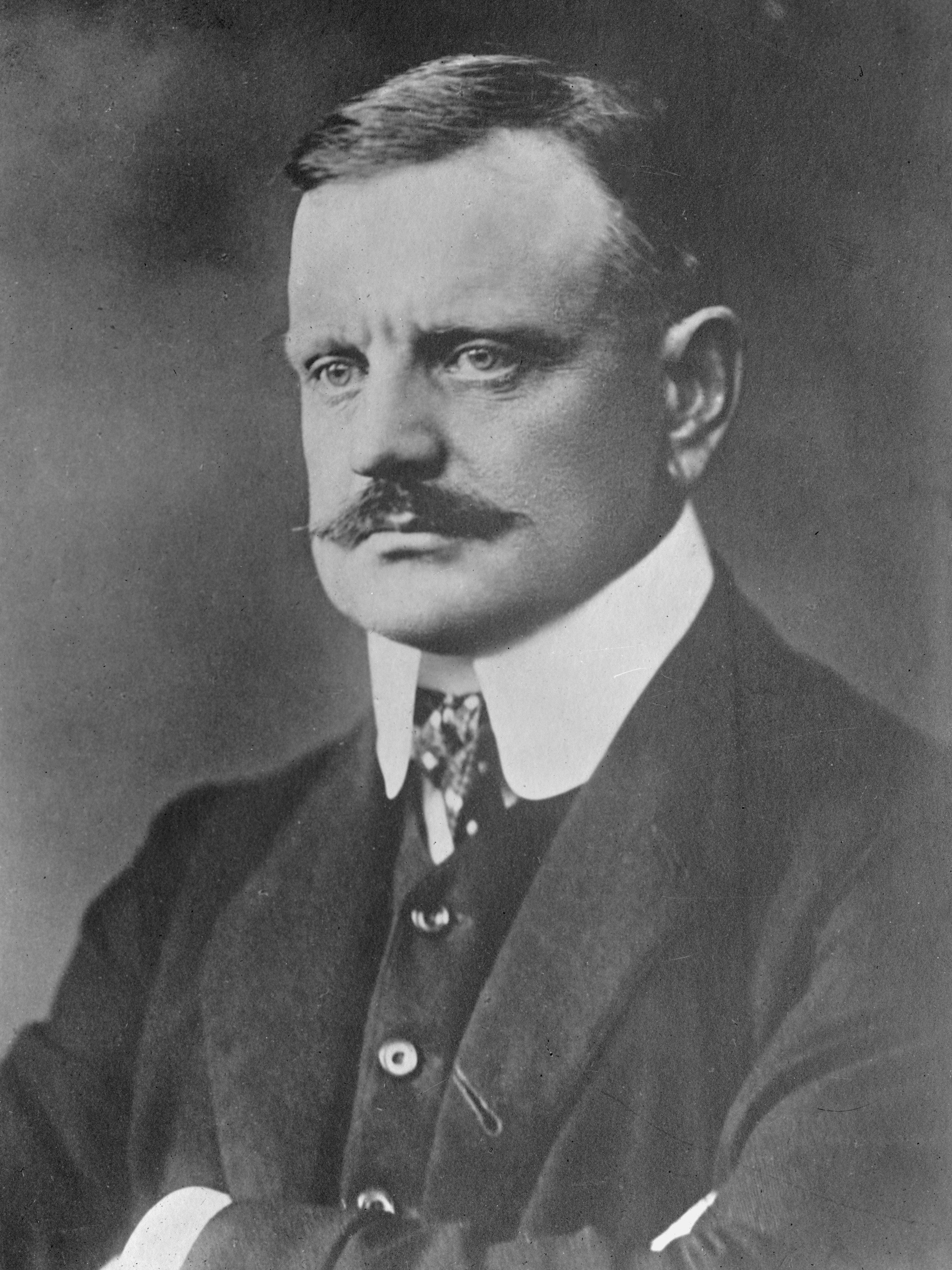
- The composer (c. 1913)
- Native name: Der Rabe
- Catalogue: None
- Text: The Raven; by Edgar Allan Poe
- Language: German
- Composed: 9 Nov. to mid-Dec. 1910; (abandoned, material reused)

The Raven (in German: Der Rabe) was a projected song for soprano and orchestra that occupied the Finnish composer Jean Sibelius from 9 November to mid-December 1910, at which point he abandoned the project. The piece, a commission by the world-renowned, Finnish prima donna Aino Ackté as a novelty for her February 1911 tour through Imperial Germany, was to have set a German-language translation of Edgar Allan Poe's 1845 narrative poem The Raven. Sibelius had accepted reluctantly, as he had at the time been at work on—and struggling to meet an early-1911 deadline for—the Fourth Symphony (Op. 63). Juggling major projects proved too much for him to bear, and on 11 December he reneged on the agreement with Ackté, greatly upsetting their professional relationship. Three years later, however, Sibelius made amends by composing for Ackté Luonnotar (Op. 70), a virtuosic, Kalevala-themed tone poem for soprano and orchestra.

As with other aborted projects—for example, the Wagnerian opera The Building of the Boat (Veneen luominen, 1893–1894) and the oratorio Marjatta (1905) (Note: The Finnish musicologist Fabian Dahlström does not, in his authoritative supplementary JS numbering system, provide The Building of the Boat, Marjatta, and The Raven with catalogue designations. This is in contrast to Sibelius's most notorious abandoned project, the Eighth Symphony (mid 1920s–c. late 1930s–1945), which Dahlström labels JS 190. Dahlström finalized his list in 2003 with the publication of Jean Sibelius: A Thematic Bibliographic Index of His Works. It runs from JS 1 to 225 and includes not only compositions Sibelius demoted from his opus list but also those that never held an opus number at any point during his career.))—Sibelius did not discard, but rather repurposed, the fruits of his labor. In this case, he incorporated material from The Raven into Movement IV of the Symphony No. 4.

== Composition and abandonment ==
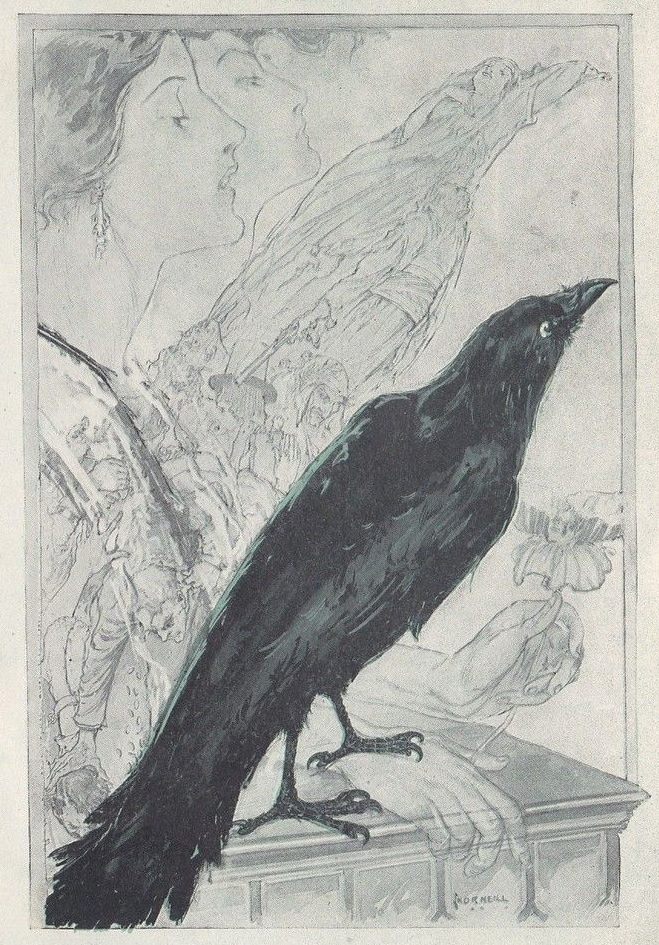
Sibelius admired Viktor Rydberg's Swedish-language translation of Poe's The Raven.

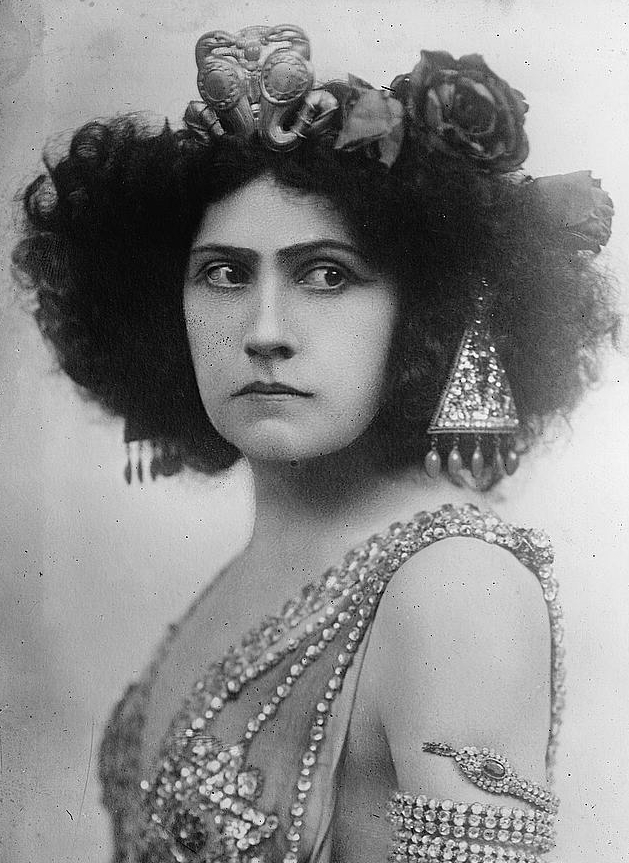
In 1910, the Finnish soprano Aino Ackté commissioned a German-language orchestral song from Sibelius.

In the summer of 1909, the Finnish soprano Aino Ackté proposed to Sibelius that the two of them should together embark on a concert tour of central Europe, with stops in Munich, Berlin, Vienna, and Prague. The plan also called for Sibelius to compose a new orchestral song for her to premiere in Germany. By the autumn of 1910, as Ackté and her impresario, Emil Gutmann, were finalizing arrangements for a February 1911 tour, she sought a commitment from Sibelius. In early November, the pair met in Helsinki and Sibelius, agreeing to his role, suggested a setting of Edgar Allan Poe's macabre narrative poem, The Raven, which he had read via the Swedish-language translation by Viktor Rydberg (1877). The Ackté commission was not without hazard, as it forced Sibelius to divert himself from the Fourth Symphony, with which he was then wrestling. Moreover, each piece was scheduled to premiere in early 1911.

He began working on The Raven on 9 November, but he quickly began to have doubts, both about his ability to successfully juggle two simultaneous projects (28 November diary entry: "Struggle with God! The Raven! Happiness and pain! Will I get it finished and perfect by February?") and the German translation of Poe's poem (3 December: "Doubts about the text. Words are always a burden in my composing".).

Herr Sibelius, I am not accustomed to being treated in this fashion and being made a laughing stock. It would have been more honest if you had said right at the outset that the idea of Sibelius concerts abroad do not appeal to you. You would have saved me a great deal of trouble ... and I would have been spared this ridiculous and embarrassing position vis-à-vis Gutmann and others, with whom you have ruined my prospects for the future.

— Aino Ackté, in a letter to Jean Sibelius

I leave the diva Ackté to drown in her publicity. The Raven will improve by keeping. The Fourth Symphony is breaking through the clouds in sunlight and power. My work is of a totally different order from these concert-givers who are commercially successful. When I give a concert no diva or prima donna should be the centre of interest—it's my symphonic music that will triumph.

— Jean Sibelius, in a diary entry

== Notes, references, and sources ==
Notes

Sources

- Barnett, Andrew (2007). Sibelius. New Haven: Yale University Press. ISBN 978-0-300-11159-0.
- Dahlström, Fabian [in Swedish] (2003). Jean Sibelius: Thematisch-bibliographisches Verzeichnis seiner Werke [Jean Sibelius: A Thematic Bibliographic Index of His Works] (in German). Wiesbaden: Breitkopf & Härtel. ISBN 3-7651-0333-0.
- Goss, Glenda Dawn (2009). Sibelius: A Composer's Life and the Awakening of Finland. Chicago: University of Chicago Press. ISBN 978-0-226-00547-8.
- Magoun, Jr., Francis Peabody, ed. (1963). The Kalevala: Or Poems of the Kaleva District. Cambridge, Massachusetts: Harvard University Press. ISBN 9780674500105.
- Tawaststjerna, Erik (2008) [1972; trans. 1986]. Sibelius: Volume 2, 1904–1914. Translated by Layton, Robert. London: Faber and Faber. ISBN 978-0-571-24773-8.
- Virtanen, Timo (2010). "Sibelius's "Resurrection Symphony"?: The Third Symphony and the "Marjatta" Oratorio". In Jackson, Timothy; Murtomäki, Veijo [in Finnish]; Davis, Colin; Virtanen, Timo (eds.). In Sibelius in the Old and New World: Aspects of His Music, Its Interpretation, and Reception. Frankfurt am Main: Peter Lang. p. 319–331. ISBN 978-3-631-56025-9.
