= Benedictus Appenzeller =

Franco-Flemish singer and composer

Benedictus Appenzeller (between 1480 and 1488 – after 1558) was a Franco-Flemish singer and composer of the Renaissance, active in Bruges and Brussels. He served Dowager Queen Mary of Hungary for much of his career, and was a prolific composer of vocal music, both sacred and secular, throughout his long career.

== Life ==
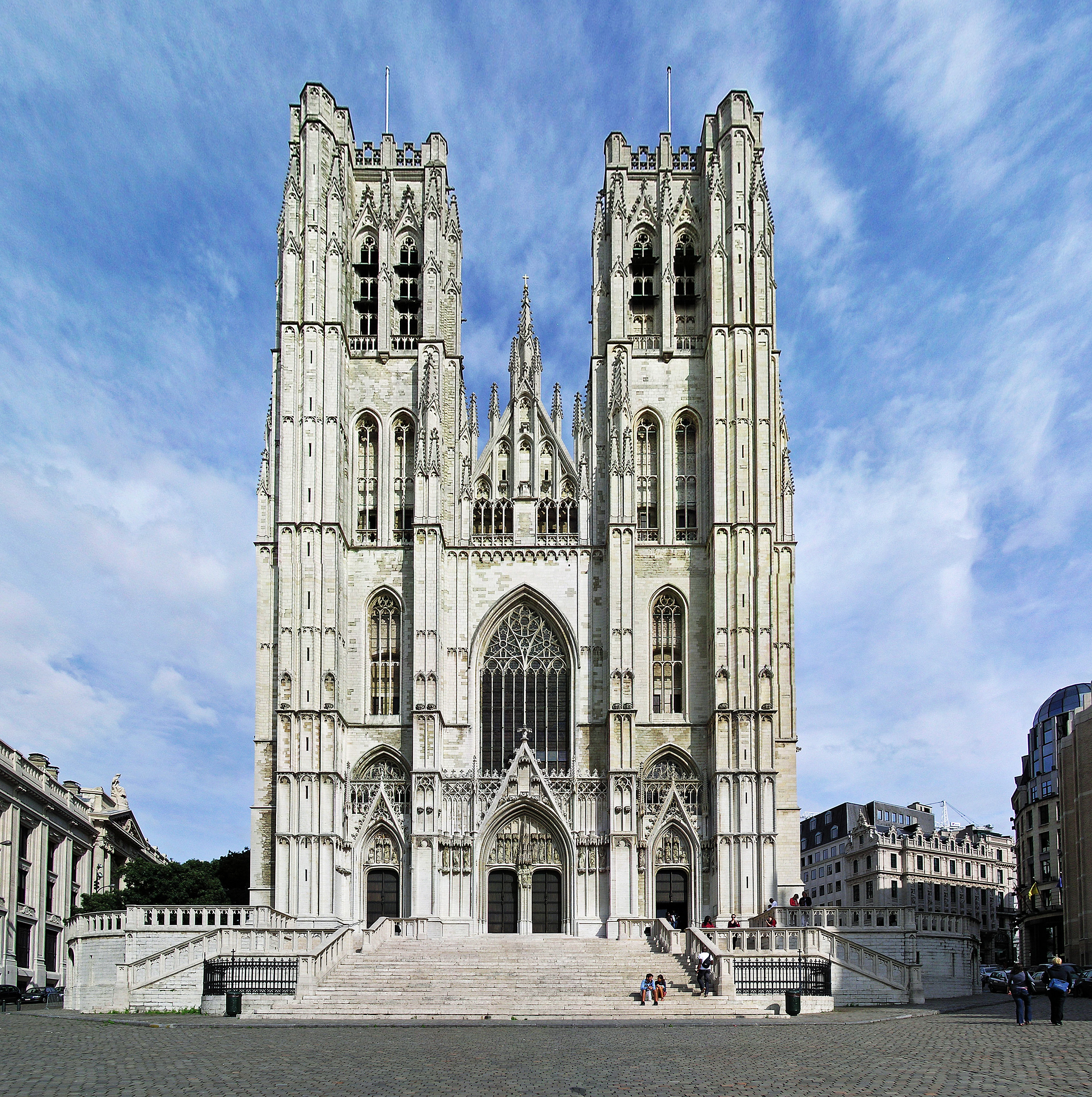
Appenzeller's last appointment was at the Cathedral of St. Michael and St. Gudula in Brussels, as choirmaster from 1555 to 1558

Appenzeller was probably born in Oudenaarde in East Flanders, and his approximate birthdate is inferred from a document late in his life, dated July 1558, in which he gave his age as "over 70". Appenzeller is first mentioned in cathedral records in 1518, when he is a singer, and in 1519, when he became choirmaster at the cathedral of St. Jacob in Bruges. His several publications during the following years show that he was active then as a composer, but nothing is known of his actual whereabouts or employment until 1536, when Dowager Queen Mary of Hungary (daughter of Philip I and Joanna the Mad of Castile) brought him into her Brussels chapel as a singer. By the next year he had become the master of the choirboys – the one responsible for teaching them music, and caring for them – and he was to hold this position, or its equivalent, until either 1551 or 1555.

While he spent most of this time in Brussels, he also occasionally travelled with Mary through the Habsburg lands, as it was common for the singers of the musical chapels to accompany monarchs and members of royal families. Some of the places he is known to have visited include 's-Hertogenbosch, Augsburg, and Munich. Mary moved to Spain in 1556, and at that time Appenzeller became the choirmaster at the Cathedral of St. Michael and St. Gudula in Brussels, a post he held until the end of 1558. No records survive of his life from after that year, and he may have died shortly thereafter.

Appenzeller has sometimes been confused with two other musicians named "Benedictus", since many of his works are attributed in their sources simply to "Benedictus". Benedictus Ducis was a German composer and Protestant cleric (1492–1544), and Benedictus de Opitiis was an organist from the same region as Appenzeller. All of the works simply attributed "Benedictus" are now considered to be the work of Appenzeller.

== Music and influence ==
Appenzeller wrote eight masses which have survived, as well as numerous motets and Magnificat settings. He also left over 40 chansons, many of which were published in Antwerp in a 1542 collection, Des chansons a quattre parties. The twenty-four chansons in this collection have been published as Benedictus Appenzeller: Chansons, edited by Glenda Goss Thompson.

Appenzeller's music shows a range of stylistic influences, as would be expected in a composer working over many decades, and subject to influences from musicians coming and going from distant parts of an empire. His sacred music is typical of the Netherlandish style of the 1540s, with dense polyphonic textures, including pervasive imitation. He also wrote elaborate canonic structures, more in the manner of the previous generation, reminiscent of the music of Josquin des Prez or Pierre de la Rue. In his secular music he strove for text comprehension, and also used more repetition, for example in musical refrains, than he did in his sacred music.
