= Sibelius Medal =

Finnish music award

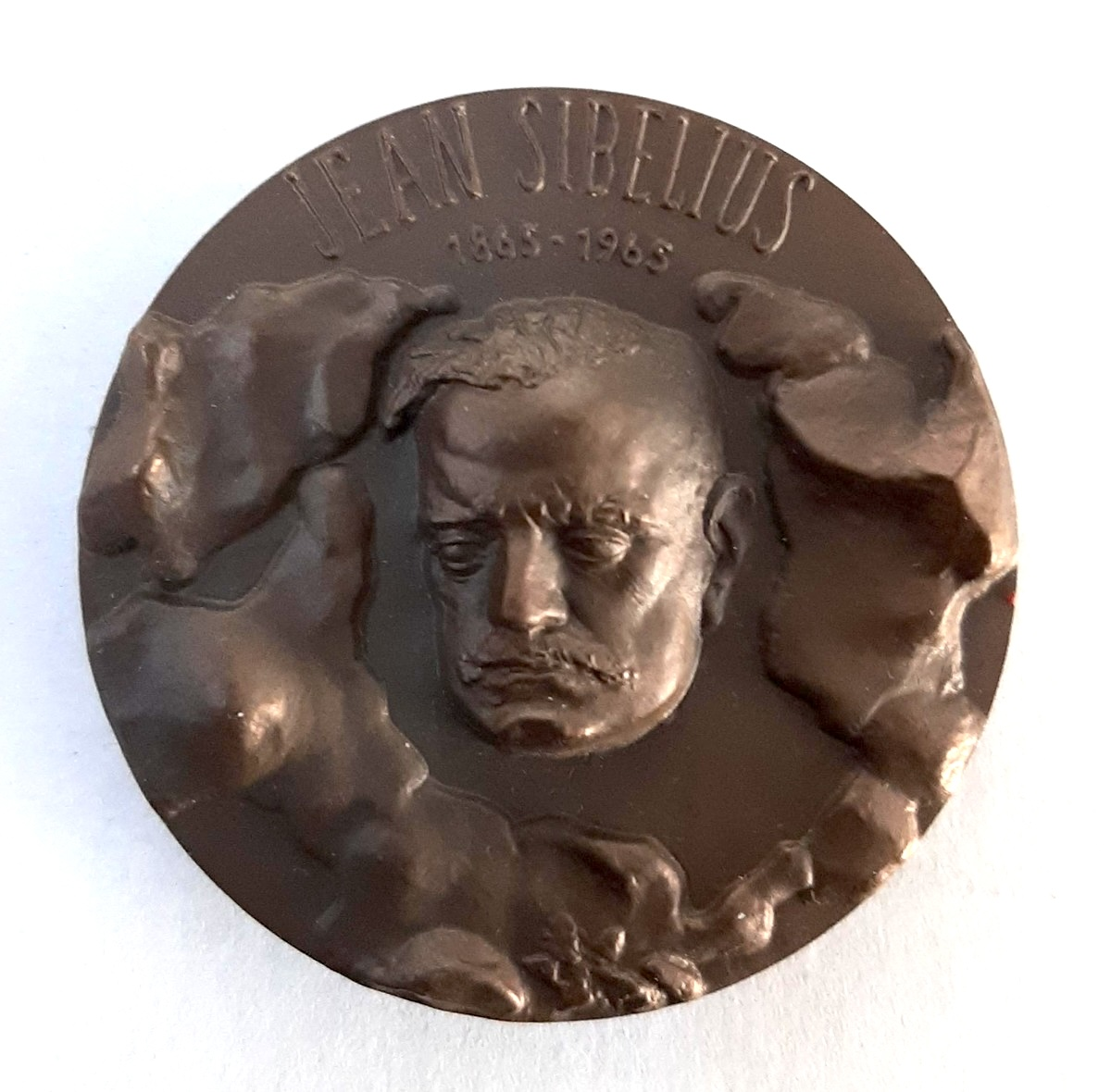
- Awarded for: "individuals and organizations for their outstanding achievements as performers or supporters of Sibelius' music."
- Sponsored by: Sibelius Society of Finland
- Country: Finland
- Presented by: Sibelius Society of Finland
- Reward: Medal
- First award: 1965
- Website: www.sibeliusseura.fi/eng/medal.html

The Sibelius Medal is awarded to individuals and organizations for their outstanding achievements as performers or supporters of the music of Finnish composer Jean Sibelius. It has been awarded by the Sibelius Society of Finland since 1965. The medal was designed by sculptor Eila Hiltunen.

== Recipients ==
The Sibelius Medal was awarded to 220 recipients from 1965 to 2015.

Selected recipients:

- 1965
  - Urho Kekkonen, No. 1
  - Aino Sibelius, No. 2
  - Herbert von Karajan, No. 3
  - Georg Szell
  - John Barbirolli
  - Birgit Nilsson
  - Eugene Ormandy
  - David Oistrakh
  - Benjamin Britten
  - Oleg Kagan
  - Emil Telmányi
  - Paavo Berglund
  - Joonas Kokkonen
- 1970
  - Okko Kamu
- 1977
  - Colin Davis
- 1978
  - Alexander Gibson
- 1979
  - Isaac Stern
- 1980
  - Henryk Szeryng
  - Ida Haendel
  - Viktoria Mullova
- 1981
  - Leonard Bernstein
- 1984
  - Vladimir Ashkenazy
- 1988
  - Gennady Rozhdestvensky
- 1990
  - Aulis Sallinen
- 1995
  - Pekka Kuusisto
- 1997
  - Glenda Goss
- 2005
  - Osmo Vänskä, chief conductor
  - Esa-Pekka Salonen, chief conductor
  - Leif Segerstam, chief conductor
- 2006
  - Izumi Tateno, pianist
- 2007
  - Jorma Hynninen, opera singer
  - Soile Isokoski, opera singer
  - Reijo Kiilunen, managing director
  - Jukka-Pekka Saraste, chief conductor
- 2008
  - the Sibelius Society of Hämeenlinna
- 2009
  - the Sibelius Society of Järvenpää
- 2010
  - Andrew Barnett (UK), chairman
- 2011
  - Tom Krause, opera singer
- 2014
  - Folke Gräsbeck, pianist
- 2015
  - Simon Rattle, conductor
  - Kari Kilpeläinen, docent
  - Hilkka Helminen, museum director
  - Paavo Järvi, conductor
  - Juha Kurkinen, managing director
  - Vesa Sirén, journalist
  - Pekka Helasvuo, conductor
  - Kikuo Watanabe, pianist
  - Markku Hartikainen, researcher
