= Luonnotar (Sibelius) =

Tone poem by Jean Sibelius

- Tone poem by Jean Sibelius
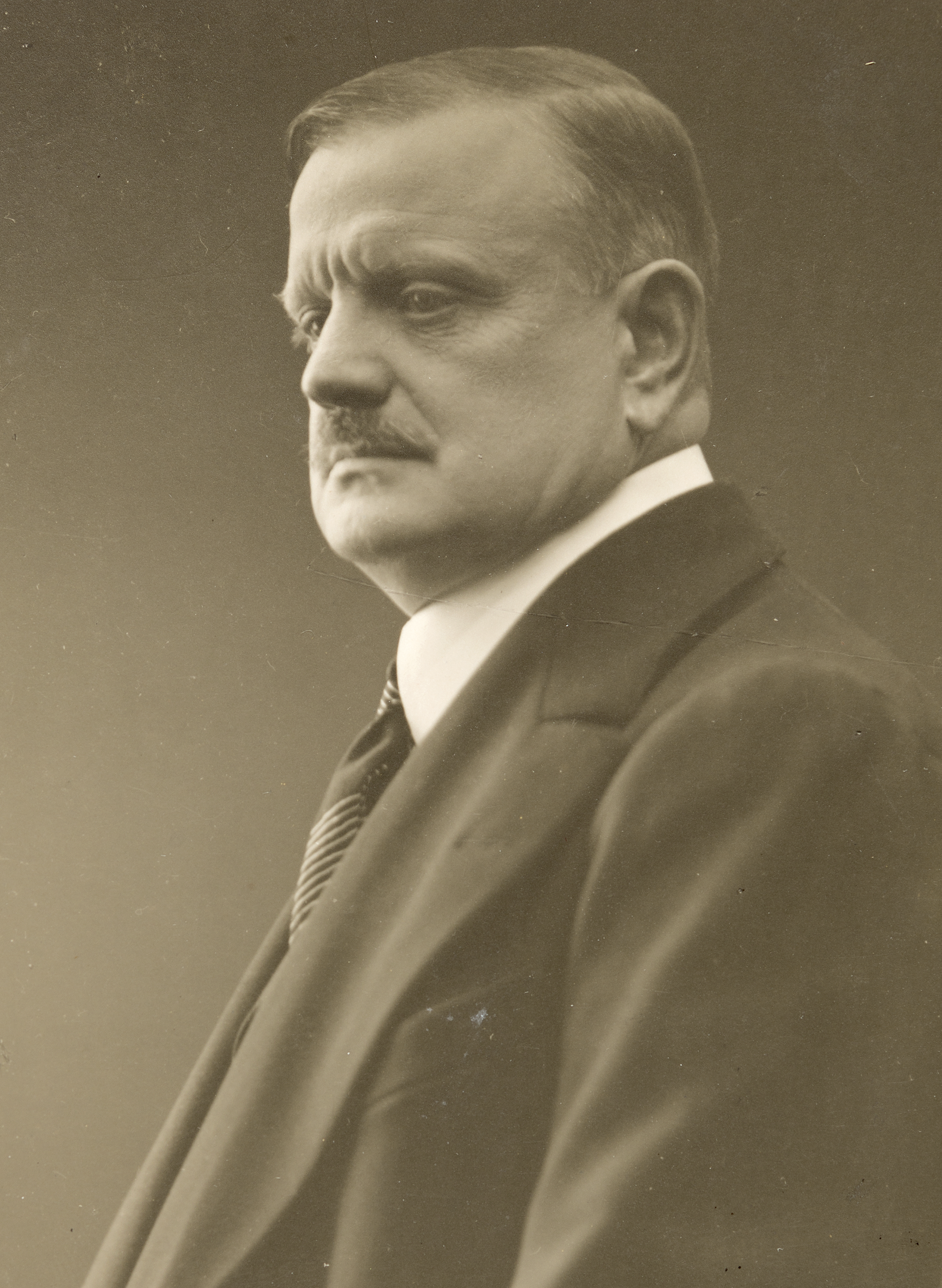
- The composer (c. 1911)
- Opus: 70
- Text: Kalevala (Runo I)
- Language: Finnish
- Composed: 1913
- Publisher: Breitkopf & Härtel (1981) (Note: Although Breitkopf & Härtel did not publish the first edition of the orchestral version of Luonnotar until 1981, the reduction for soprano and piano first appeared in 1915.)
- Duration: 10 mins.

Premiere
- Date: 10 September 1913
- Location: Gloucester, England
- Conductor: Herbert Brewer
- Performers: Three Choirs Festival Orchestra; Aino Ackté (soprano)

Luonnotar (Finnish pronunciation: [ˈluo̯nːotɑr]), Op. 70, is a single-movement tone poem for soprano and orchestra written in 1913 by the Finnish composer Jean Sibelius. The piece is a setting of Runo I (lines 111–242, freely adapted) of the Kalevala, Finland's national epic, which tells the legend of how the goddess Luonnotar (the female spirit of nature) created the Earth. Luonnotar premiered on 10 September 1913 at the Three Choirs Festival in Gloucester, England, with Herbert Brewer conducting the festival orchestra; the soloist was the Finnish operatic diva (and frequent Sibelius collaborator) Aino Ackté, the tone poem's dedicatee. A few months later on 12 January 1914, Ackté gave Luonnotar its Finnish premiere, with Georg Schnéevoigt conducting the Helsinki Philharmonic Orchestra.

== History ==
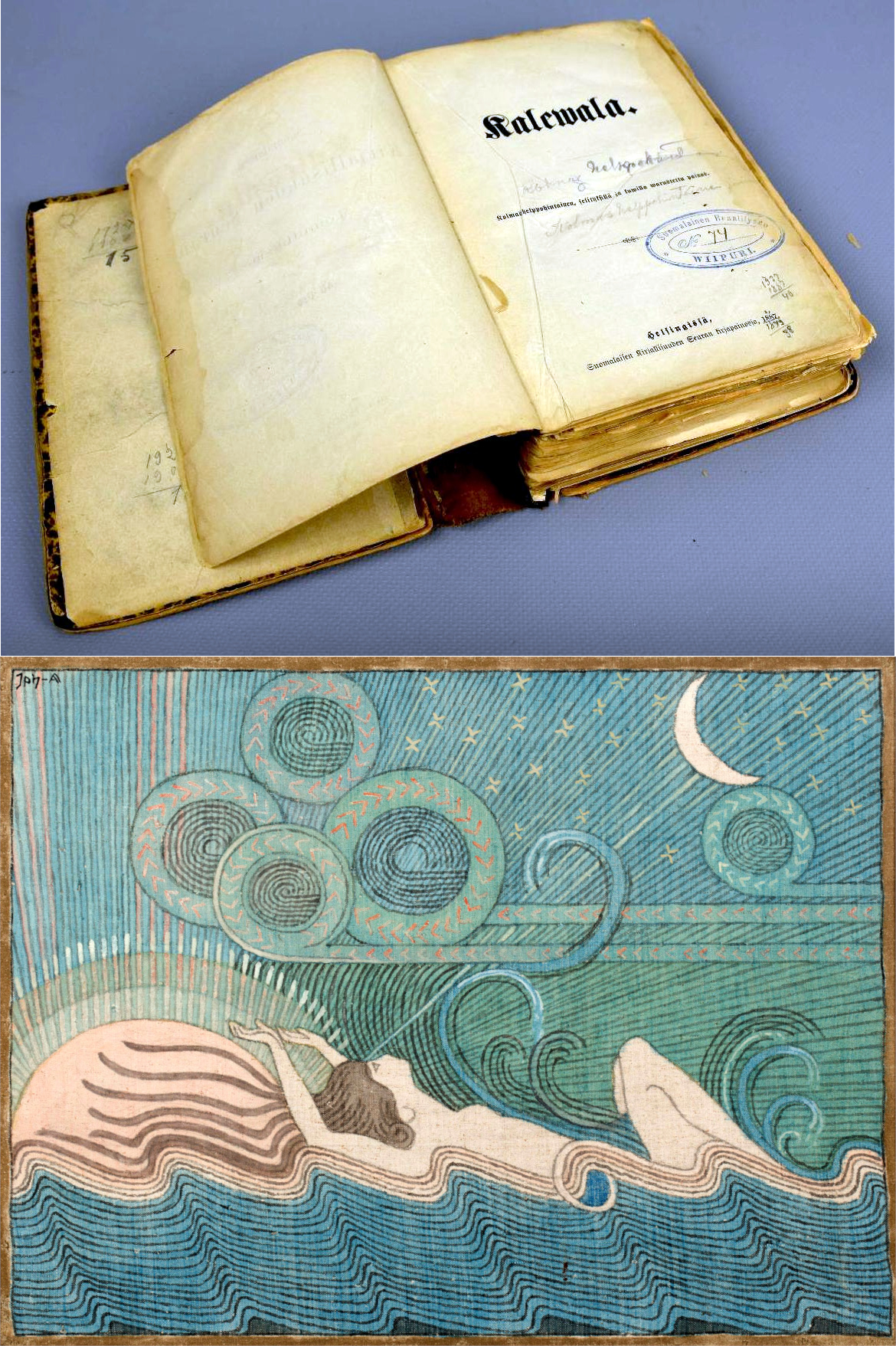
The metre and myths the Kalevala inspired many of Sibelius's tone poems, including 1913's Luonnotar.

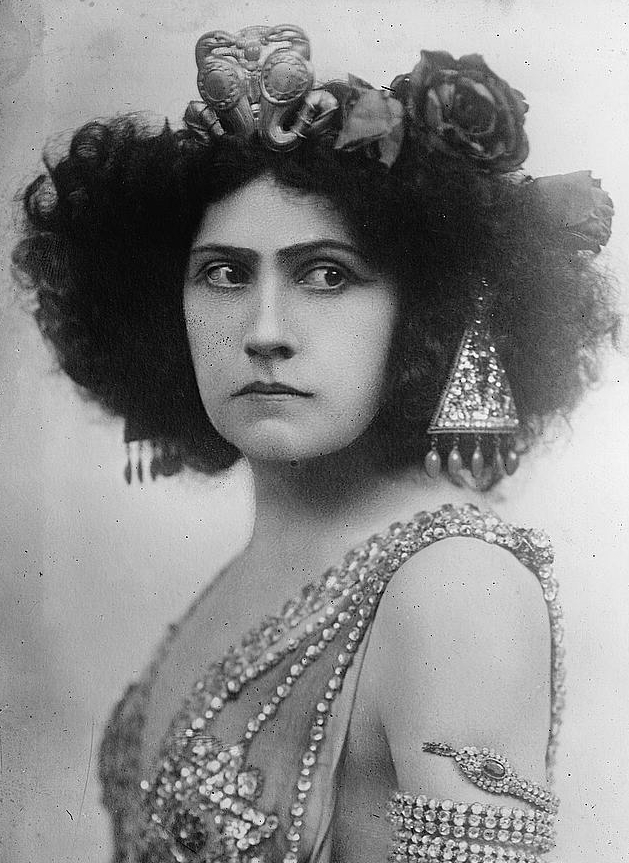
The celebrated Finnish operatic soprano Aino Ackté (here in 1910 as Salome) commissioned Luonnotar from Sibelius.

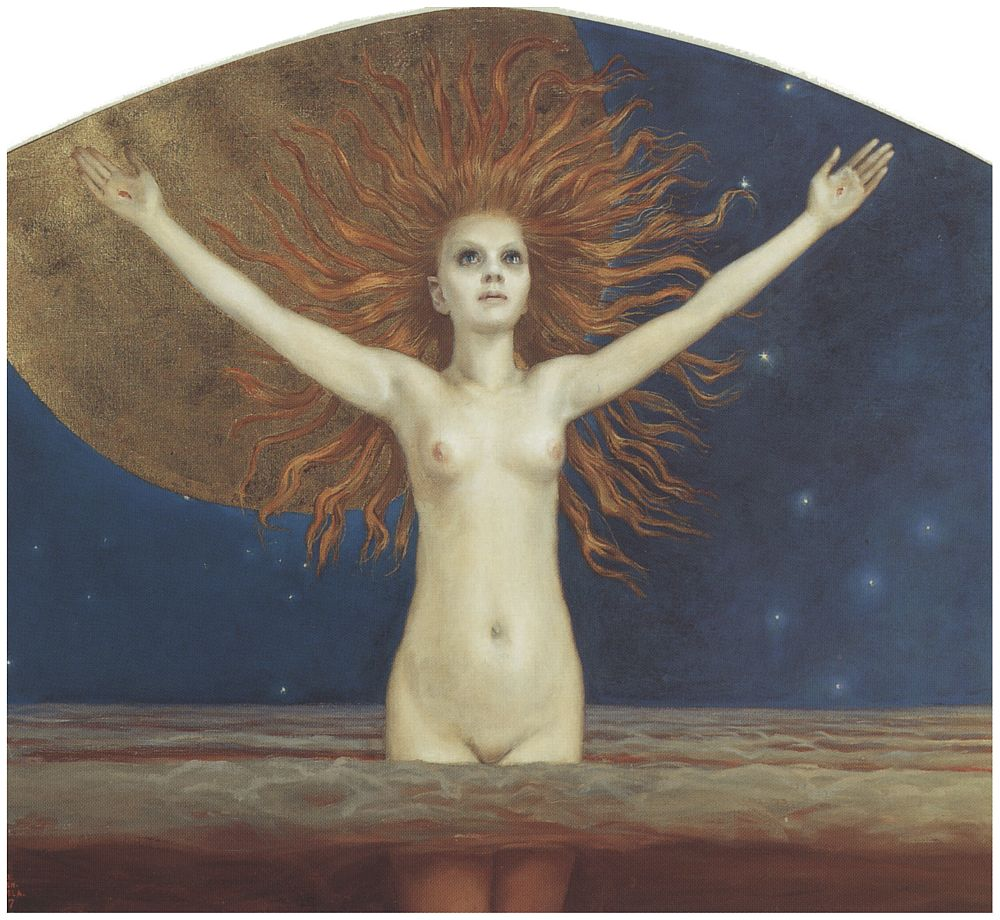
A goddess of creation (here painted by Akseli Gallen-Kallela) is a storytelling devise common to many mythologies and religions.

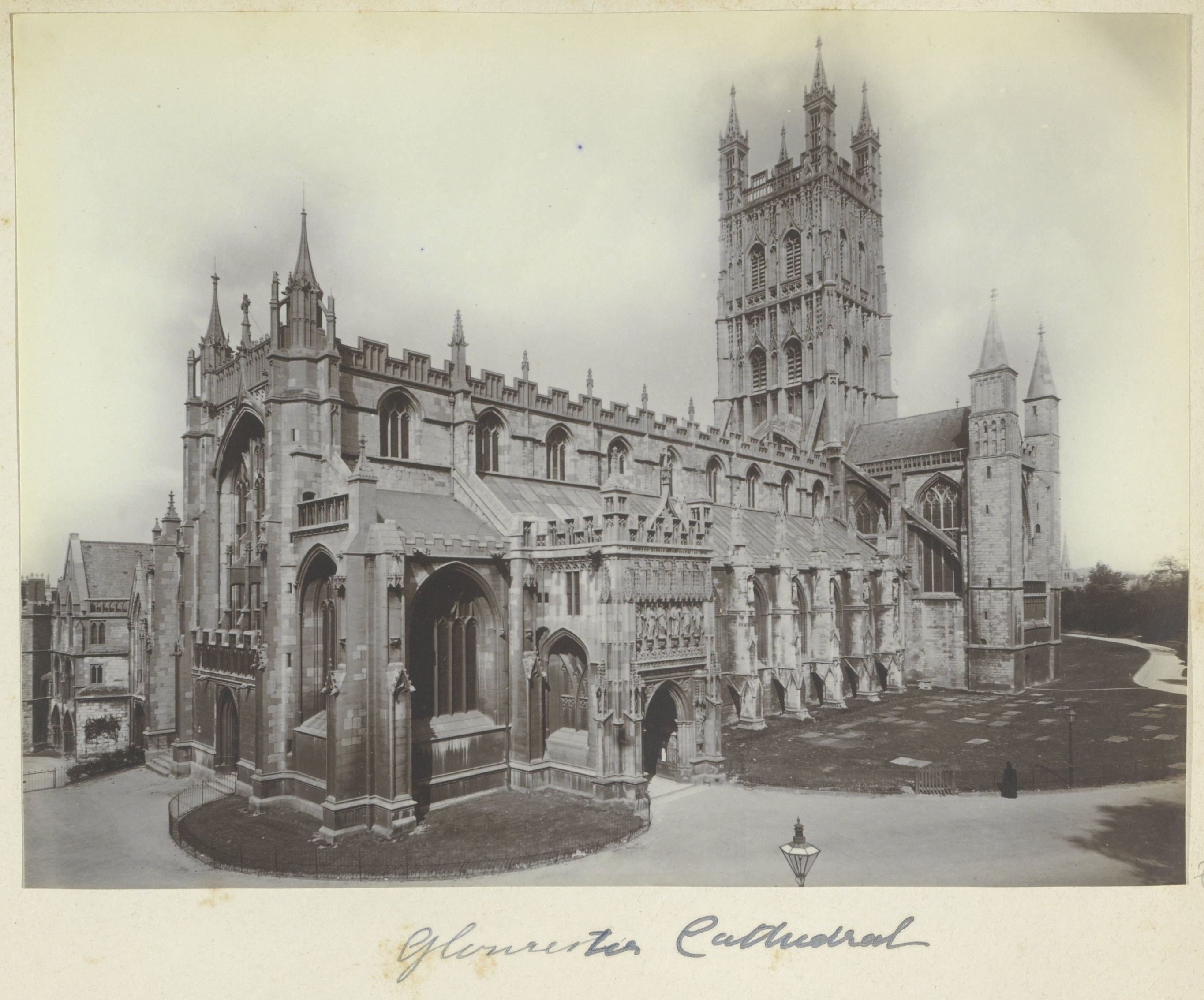
Gloucester Cathedral, at which Ackté premiered Sibelius's Luonnotar on 10 September 1913.

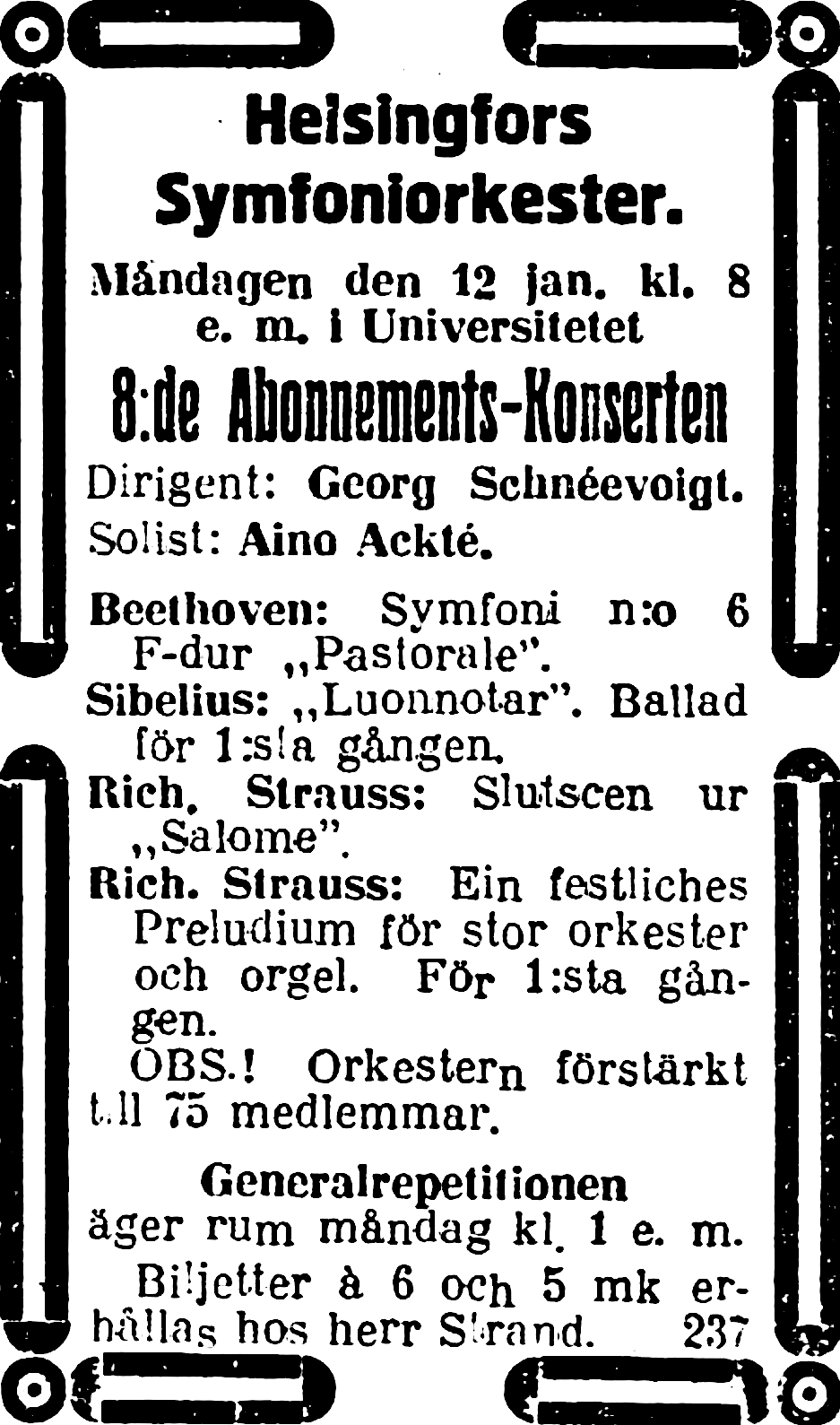
An 11 January 1914 advertisement (in Swedish) from Nya Pressen promoting the Finnish premiere of Sibelius's Luonnotar

Luonnotar is thematically unrelated to an earlier project of Sibelius's by the same name from 1903–1905; that 'Luonnotar' (for which a fragment is extant) grew out of the abandoned oratorio Marjatta (without catalogue number) and, by 1906, had evolved into the orchestral tone poem Pohjola's Daughter (Pohjolan tytär, Op. 49). In 1913, Sibelius arranged Luonnotar for soprano and piano.

== Instrumentation ==
Luonnotar is scored for the following instruments and voices, organized by family (vocalists, woodwinds, brass, percussion, and strings):

- Soprano
- 2 flutes (each doubling on piccolo), (Note: The second flutist only plays two notes on piccolo.) 2 oboes, 2 clarinets (in A), 1 bass clarinet (in B♭), and 2 bassoons
- 4 horns (in F), 2 trumpets (in B♭), and 3 trombones
- Timpani (2 players)
- Violins (I and II), violas, cellos, double basses, and 2 harps

== Discography ==
The Hungarian-American conductor Antal Doráti and the London Symphony Orchestra made the world premiere studio recording of Luonnotar in February 1969 for His Master's Voice; the soloist was the Welsh soprano Dame Gwyneth Jones. However, recordings of two earlier live performances by the Helsinki Philharmonic Orchestra also are commercially available: first, led by the Finnish conductor Georg Schnéevoigt in 1934, with the Finnish soprano Helmi Liukkonen as soloist; and second, led by the Finnish conductor Tauno Hannikainen in 1955, with the Austro-British soprano Dame Elisabeth Schwarzkopf as soloist. The table below lists these and other recordings:

No.	Conductor	Orchestra	Soloist	Rec. (Note: Refers to the year in which the performers recorded the work; this may not be the same as the year in which the recording was first released to the general public.)	Time	Recording venue	Label	Ref.
1	Georg Schnéevoigt	Helsinki Philharmonic Orchestra (1)	Helmi Liukkonen	1934 ^{L}	8:48	Queen's Hall	Warner Classics	(Note: G. Schnéevoigt—Warner Classics (2564 605317) 2015)
2	Tauno Hannikainen	Helsinki Philharmonic Orchestra (2)	Dame Elisabeth Schwarzkopf	1955 ^{L}	8:58	?	Gala	(Note: T. Hannikainen—Gala (GL100.820) 2013)
3	Antal Doráti	London Symphony Orchestra	Dame Gwyneth Jones	1969	9:26	Wembley Town Hall	EMI Classics	(Note: A. Dorati—EMI Classics (7243 5 85785 2 2) 2004)
4	Leonard Bernstein	New York Philharmonic	Phyllis Curtin	1969	8:11	Philharmonic Hall	Sony Classical	(Note: L. Bernstein—Sony Classical (SMK 61848) 2015)
5	Paavo Berglund	Bournemouth Symphony Orchestra	Taru Valjakka	1975	9:53	Southampton Guildhall	EMI Classics	(Note: P. Berglund—EMI Classics (7243 5 69773 2 7) 1997)
6	Sir Alexander Gibson	Royal Scottish National Orchestra	Phyllis Bryn-Julson	1977	9:13	Glasgow City Halls	Chandos	(Note: A. Gibson—Chandos (CHAN 241 19) 2004)
7	Vladimir Ashkenazy	Philharmonia Orchestra	Elisabeth Söderström	1980	9:19	Kingsway Hall	Decca	(Note: V. Ashkenazy—Decca (473 590–2) 2003)
8	Jorma Panula	Gothenburg Symphony Orchestra (1)	MariAnne Häggander	1984	9:00	Gothenburg Concert Hall	BIS	(Note: J. Panula—BIS (CD–270) 1984)
9	Gunnar Staern	Swedish Radio Symphony Orchestra	Siv Wennberg	? ^{L}	8:20	?	Sterling	(Note: G. Staern—Sterling (CDA 1804/05–2) 2017)
10	Vassily Sinaisky	Moscow Philharmonic Orchestra	Mare Jõgeva	1991	8:19	Mosfilm Studios	Brilliant Classics	(Note: V. Sinaisky—Brilliant Classics (BC 9212) 2010)
11	Neeme Järvi	Gothenburg Symphony Orchestra (2)	Soile Isokoski (1)	1992	8:29	Gothenburg Concert Hall	Deutsche Grammophon	(Note: N. Järvi—DG (447 760–2) 1996)
12	Paavo Järvi	Royal Stockholm Philharmonic Orchestra	Solveig Kringlebotn	1996	9:18	Stockholm Concert Hall	Virgin Classics / Erato	(Note: P. Järvi—Erato (5220552) 2008)
13	Sakari Oramo (1)	City of Birmingham Symphony Orchestra	Karita Mattila	2001	9:44	Symphony Hall, Birmingham	Warner Classics	(Note: S. Oramo—Warner Classics (8573 80243–2) 2004)
14	Sir Colin Davis	Staatskapelle Dresden	Ute Selbig	2003 ^{L}	9:49	Semperoper	Profil	(Note: C. Davis—Profil (PH05049) 2005)
15	Osmo Vänskä	Lahti Symphony Orchestra (1)	Helena Juntunen (1)	2005	8:50	Sibelius Hall	BIS	(Note: O. Vänskä—BIS (CD–1565) 2006)
16	Leif Segerstam	Helsinki Philharmonic Orchestra (3)	Soile Isokoski (2)	2005	8:49	Finlandia Hall	Ondine	(Note: L. Segerstam—Ondine (ODE 1080–5) 2006)
17	Ulf Schirmer	Munich Radio Orchestra	Camilla Nylund	2006	9:07	Bayerischer Rundfunk Studio 1	cpo	(Note: U. Schirmer—cpo (777 262–2) 2008)
18	Sakari Oramo (2)	Lahti Symphony Orchestra (2)	Anu Komsi	2011	9:09	Sibelius Hall	BIS	(Note: S. Oramo—BIS (SACD–1962) 2012)
19	Edward Gardner	Bergen Philharmonic Orchestra	Lise Davidsen	2018	8:50	Grieg Hall	Chandos	(Note: E. Gardner—Chandos (CHSA 5217) 2021)

Additionally, in 2008, BIS made the world premiere studio recording of Sibelius's transcription of Luonnotar, with the Finnish soprano Helena Juntunen and the Finnish pianist Folke Gräsbeck. The table below contains additional details about this recording:

No.	Soloist	Pianist	Rec.	Time	Recording venue	Label	Ref.
1	Helena Juntunen (2)	Folke Gräsbeck	2008	8:48	Kuusankoski Concert Hall	BIS	(Note: F. Gräsbeck—BIS (CD–1918/20) 2008)

== Notes, references, and sources ==
Notes

Sources

- Barnett, Andrew (2007). Sibelius. New Haven: Yale University Press. ISBN 978-0-300-11159-0.
- Dahlström, Fabian [in Swedish] (2003). Jean Sibelius: Thematisch-bibliographisches Verzeichnis seiner Werke [Jean Sibelius: A Thematic Bibliographic Index of His Works] (in German). Wiesbaden: Breitkopf & Härtel. ISBN 3-7651-0333-0.
- Goss, Glenda Dawn (2009). Sibelius: A Composer's Life and the Awakening of Finland. Chicago: University of Chicago Press. ISBN 978-0-226-00547-8.
- Magoun, Jr., Francis Peabody, ed. (1963). The Kalevala: Or Poems of the Kaleva District. Cambridge, Massachusetts: Harvard University Press. ISBN 9780674500105.
- Tawaststjerna, Erik (2008) [1972; trans. 1986]. Sibelius: Volume 2, 1904–1914. Translated by Layton, Robert. London: Faber and Faber. ISBN 978-0-571-24773-8.
