= Scènes historiques II =

Concert suite by Jean Sibelius (1912)

- Concert suite by Jean Sibelius
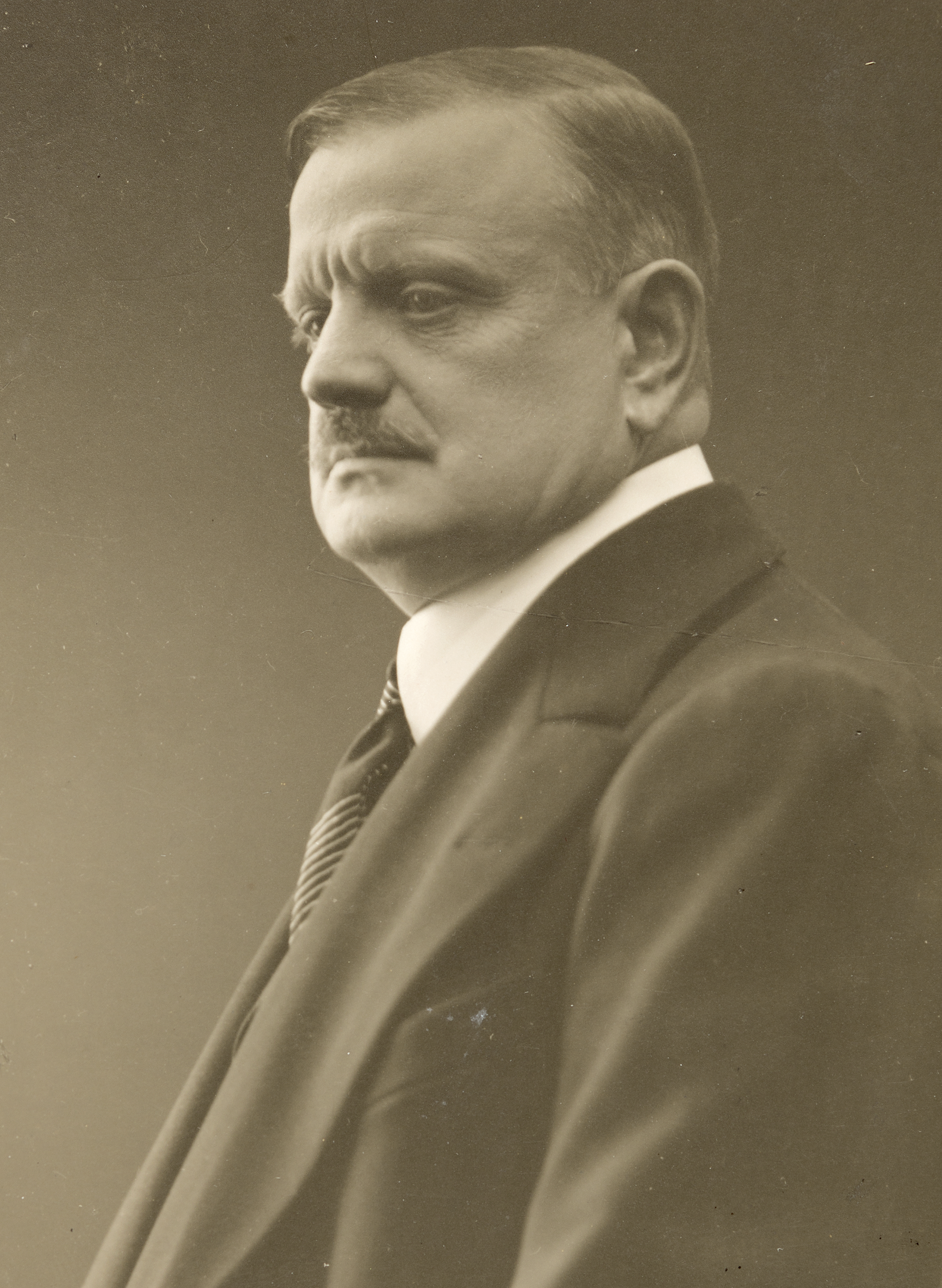
- The composer (c. 1911)
- Opus: 66
- Composed: 1912
- Publisher: Breitkopf & Härtel (1913)
- Duration: 17.5 mins.
- Movements: 3

Premiere
- Date: 29 March 1912 (Op. 25)
- Location: Helsinki, Finland
- Conductor: Jean Sibelius
- Performers: Helsinki Philharmonic Society

The Scènes historiques II (literal English translation: Historical Scenes II), Op. 66, is a three-movement concert suite for orchestra written in 1912 by the Finnish composer Jean Sibelius. The suite premiered on 29 March 1912 at the University Hall in Helsinki, with Sibelius conducting the Helsinki Philharmonic Society.

== Structure ==
The Scènes historiques II contains three numbers, as follows:

1. Overture: The Chase. (Ouvertüre: Die Jagd.) Andante — Allegro con brio
2. The Love Song. (Minnelied.) Largo
3. At the Draw-bridge. (An der Zugbrücke.) Allegro moderato

== Instrumentation ==
The first number of the Scènes historiques II, The Chase, is scored for the following instruments, organized by family (woodwinds, brass, percussion, and strings):

- 2 flutes, 2 oboes, 2 clarinets (in B♭), and 2 bassoons
- 4 horns (in F)
- Timpani
- Violins (I and II), violas, cellos, and double basses

The Love Song (No. 2) adds harp to this ensemble, while At the Drawbridge (No. 3) expands the percussion section to include triangle and tam-tam; in addition, No. 3 calls for one flutist to double piccolo.

== Discography ==
The sortable table below contains commercially available recordings of the complete Scènes historiques II:

No.	Conductor	Ensemble	Rec. (Note: Refers to the year in which the performers recorded the work; this may not be the same as the year in which the recording was first released to the general public.)	Time	Recording venue	Label	Ref.
1	Jussi Jalas	Hungarian State Symphony Orchestra	1974	16:43	Torockó Square Church, Budapest	Decca	(Note: J. Jalas—Decca (482 3311) 2015)
2	Sir Alexander Gibson	Scottish National Orchestra	1977	18:03	Motherwell Town Hall	Chandos	(Note: A. Gibson—Chandos (CHAN 8393) 1985)
3	Neeme Järvi	Gothenburg Symphony Orchestra	1985	17:51	Gothenburg Concert Hall	BIS	(Note: N. Järvi–BIS (CD–295) 1986)
4	Jukka-Pekka Saraste	Finnish Radio Symphony Orchestra	1988	17:43	Kulttuuritalo	RCA Red Seal	(Note: J. Saraste–RCA (19439704812) 2020)
5	Leif Segerstam	Danish National Symphony Orchestra	1995	19:26	Danish Radio Concert Hall	Chandos	(Note: L. Segerstam–Chandos (CHAN 9483) 1996)
6	Ari Rasilainen	Norwegian Radio Orchestra	2001	19:01	NRK Broadcasting Hall	Finlandia	(Note: A. Rasilainen–Finlandia (0927–41935–2) 2002)
7	Pietari Inkinen	New Zealand Symphony Orchestra	2006	19:42	Wellington Town Hall	Naxos	(Note: P. Sakari–Naxos (8.570068) 2008)

== Notes, references, and sources ==
Notes

Sources

- Barnett, Andrew (2007). Sibelius. New Haven: Yale University Press. ISBN 978-0-300-11159-0.
- Dahlström, Fabian [in Swedish] (2003). Jean Sibelius: Thematisch-bibliographisches Verzeichnis seiner Werke [Jean Sibelius: A Thematic Bibliographic Index of His Works] (in German). Wiesbaden: Breitkopf & Härtel. ISBN 3-7651-0333-0.
- Tawaststjerna, Erik (2008b) [1972; trans. 1986]. Sibelius: Volume II, 1904–1914. Translated by Layton, Robert. London: Faber and Faber. ISBN 978-0-571-24773-8.
