= Pohjola's Daughter =

Tone poem by Jean Sibelius

- Tone poem by Jean Sibelius
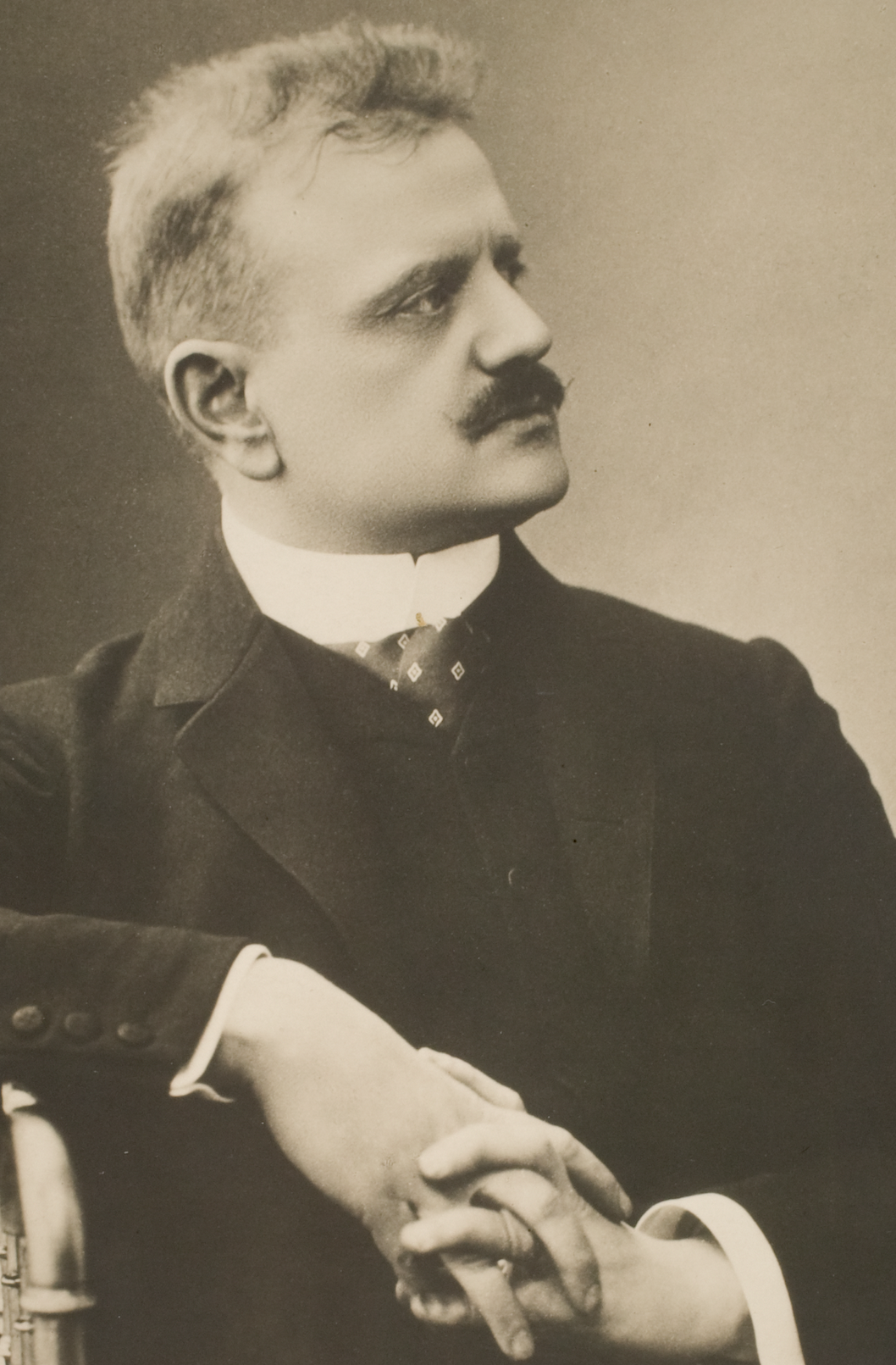
- The composer (c. 1905)
- Native name: Pohjolan tytär
- Opus: 49
- Based on: Kalevala (Runo VIII)
- Composed: 1903–1906
- Publisher: Lienau (1906)
- Duration: 13 mins.

Premiere
- Date: 29 December 1906
- Location: Saint Petersburg, Russian Empire
- Conductor: Jean Sibelius
- Performers: Marinsky Theatre Orchestra

The tone poem Pohjola's Daughter (in Finnish: Pohjolan tytär), Op. 49, was composed by the Finnish composer Jean Sibelius in 1906. Originally, Sibelius intended to title the work Väinämöinen, after the character in the Kalevala (the Finnish national epic). The publisher Robert Lienau insisted on the German title Tochter des Nordens ("Daughter of the North"), which is a literal translation of the work's Finnish title, Pohjolan tytär, traditionally given in English as Pohjola's Daughter. Sibelius then countered with the new title L'aventure d'un héros. He also considered calling the work Luonnotar. However, Lienau's suggestion eventually became the work's published title. (The title Luonnotar was subsequently given to a later piece.) This was the first work that Sibelius wrote directly for a German music publisher. Its first performance was given in Saint Petersburg in December 1906, with the composer himself conducting the Orchestra of the Mariinsky Theatre.

The passage in the Kalevala that inspired this work is in the 8th Runo, known in various English translations as "The Wound" or "Väinämöinen and the Maiden of North Farm". The tone poem depicts the "steadfast, old," white-bearded Väinämöinen, who spots the beautiful "daughter of the North (Pohjola)", seated on a rainbow, weaving a cloth of gold while he is riding a sleigh through the dusky landscape. Väinämöinen asks her to join him, but she replies that she will only leave with a man who can perform a number of challenging tasks, such as tying an egg into invisible knots and, most notably, building a boat from fragments of her distaff. Väinämöinen attempts to fulfill these tasks through his own expertise in magic; in many of the tasks he succeeds, but he is eventually thwarted by evil spirits when attempting to build the boat and injures himself with an axe. He gives up, abandons the tasks and continues on his journey alone.

== Instrumentation ==
Pohjola's Daughter is scored for the following instruments, organized by family (woodwinds, brass, percussion, and strings):

- 1 piccolo, 2 flutes, 2 oboes, 1 cor anglais, 2 clarinets (in B♭), 1 bass clarinet (in B♭), 2 bassoons, and 1 contrabassoon
- 4 horns (in F), 2 cornets (in B♭), 2 trumpets (in B♭), 3 trombones, and tuba
- Timpani
- Violins (I and II), violas, cellos, double basses, and harp

== Discography ==
The Finnish conductor Robert Kajanus and the London Symphony Orchestra made the world premiere studio recording of Pohjola's Daughter in June 1932, which appeared on Volume 1 of HMV's The Sibelius Society series (C 507, 1933). Since Kanajus's pioneering example, many conductors have recorded the work, with Sir Colin Davis—in terms of superlatives—having made four recordings (1979, 2000, 2002, and 2005). The table below lists these and other commercially available recordings:

| No. | Conductor | Orchestra | Rec. (Note: Refers to the year in which the performers recorded the work; this may not be the same as the year in which the recording was first released to the general public.) | Time | Recording venue | Label | Ref. |
|---|---|---|---|---|---|---|---|
| 1 | Robert Kajanus | London Symphony Orchestra (1) | 1932 | 12:38 | Abbey Road Studio No. 1 | Naxos Historical | (Note: R. Kajanus–Naxos Historical (8.111393) 2012) |
| 2 | Serge Koussevitzky | Boston Symphony Orchestra (1) | 1936 | 12:23 | Boston Symphony Hall | Naxos Historical | (Note: S. Koussevitzky–Naxos Historical (8.110168) 2004) |
| 3 | Arturo Toscanini | NBC Symphony Orchestra | 1940 | 12:45 | Rockefeller Center | Naxos Historical | (Note: A. Toscanini–Naxos Historical (8.110810) 1998) |
| 4 | Pierre Monteux | Standard Hour Symphony Orchestra | 1948 | ? | [unknown venue], San Francisco | Music & Arts | (Note: P. Monteux–Music & Arts (CD–1192/13) 2006) |
| 5 | Sir Adrian Boult | London Philharmonic Orchestra (1) | 1956 | 13:45 | Walthamstow Town Hall | SOMM | (Note: A. Boult–SOMM (SOMMCD 093) 2009) |
| 6 | Sir Anthony Collins | London Symphony Orchestra (2) | 1954 | 12:44 | Kingsway Hall | Beulah | (Note: A. Collins–Beulah (3PD8) 1994) |
| 7 | Eugene Ormandy (1) | Philadelphia Orchestra (1) | 1955 | 11:45 | Academy of Music, Philadelphia | Sony Classical | (Note: E. Ormandy–Sony Classical (19439757482) 2021) |
| 8 | Sir Malcom Sargent | BBC Symphony Orchestra | 1958 | 12:31 | Kingsway Hall | EMI Classics | (Note: M. Sargent–EMI (CDE 7 67787 2) 1993) |
| 9 | Morton Gould | Morton Gould Orchestra | 1962 | 13:40 | Manhattan Center | RCA Red Seal | (Note: M. Gould–RCA Red Seal (88985321742–54) 2016) |
| 10 | Leonard Bernstein | New York Philharmonic | 1964 | 12:35 | Manhattan Center | Sony Classical | (Note: L. Bernstein–Sony Classical (88875026142) 2015) |
| 11 | Sir John Barbirolli | Hallé Orchestra (1) | 1966 | 14:13 | Abbey Road Studio No. 1 | EMI Classics | (Note: J. Barbirolli–EMI Classics (7243 5 67299 2 6) 2000) |
| 12 | Horst Stein | L'Orchestre de la Suisse Romande | 1971 | 13:10 | Victoria Hall | Decca | (Note: H. Stein–Decca (482 3922) 2015) |
| 13 | Paavo Berglund | Bournemouth Symphony Orchestra | 1974 | 13:50 | Southampton Guildhall | EMI Classics | (Note: P. Berglund–EMI Classics (7243 5 69773 2 7) 1997) |
| 14 | Eugene Ormandy (2) | Philadelphia Orchestra (2) | 1976 | 13:01 | Scottish Rite Cathedral, Philadelphia | Sony Classical | (Note: E. Ormandy–Sony Classical (88875108582) 2015) |
| 15 | Sir Alexander Gibson | Royal Scottish National Orchestra | 1977 | 12:30 | Glasgow City Halls | Chandos | (Note: A. Gibson–Chandos (CHAN 8395/6) 1985) |
| 16 | Sir Colin Davis (1) | Boston Symphony Orchestra (2) | 1979 | 14:55 | Symphony Hall, Boston | Decca Records | (Note: C. Davis–Decca (478 3696) 2012) |
| 17 | Gennady Rozhdestvensky | London Symphony Orchestra (3) | 1985 | 15:18 | Abbey Road Studio No. 1 | Cirrus | (Note: G. Rozhdestvensky–Cirrus (CICD 1002) 1986) |
| 18 | Neeme Järvi (1) | Gothenburg Symphony Orchestra (1) | 1985 | 12:53 | Gothenburg Concert Hall | BIS | (Note: N. Järvi–BIS (CD–312) 1986) |
| 19 | Esa-Pekka Salonen | Philharmonia Orchestra | 1986 | 13:46 | Abbey Road Studio No. 1 | CBS Masterworks | (Note: E. Salonen–CBS Masterworks (MK 42366) 1987) |
| 20 | Kenneth Schermerhorn | Czechoslovak Radio Symphony Orchestra | 1988 | 13:59 | Czechoslovak Radio Concert Hall | Naxos | (Note: K. Schermerhorn–Naxos (8.550103) 1988) |
| 21 | Jukka-Pekka Saraste (1) | Finnish Radio Symphony Orchestra (1) | 1988 | 13:02 | Kulttuuritalo | RCA Red Seal | (Note: J. Saraste–RCA (19439704812) 2020) |
| 22 | Leif Segerstam (1) | Danish National Symphony Orchestra | 1991 | 14:16 | Danish Radio Concert Hall | Chandos | (Note: L. Segerstam–Chandos (CHAN 8965) 1991) |
| 23 | Vassily Sinaisky | Moscow Philharmonic Orchestra | 1991 | 13:02 | Mosfilm Studios | Brilliant Classics | (Note: V. Sinaisky–Brilliant Classics (BC9212) 2010) |
| 24 | Yoel Levi | Atlanta Symphony Orchestra | 1992 | 14:12 | Woodruff Arts Center | Telarc | (Note: Y. Levi–Telarc (CD–80320) 1993) |
| 25 | Neeme Järvi (2) | Gothenburg Symphony Orchestra (2) | 1994 | 12:05 | Gothenburg Concert Hall | Deutsche Grammophon | (Note: N. Järvi–DG (477 6654) 2007) |
| 26 | Tuomas Hannikainen | Tampere Philharmonic Orchestra | 1995 | 13:29 | Tampere Hall | Ondine | (Note: T. Hannikainen–Ondine (ODE 871–2) 1996) |
| 27 | Sakari Oramo | City of Birmingham Symphony Orchestra | 2001 | 11:51 | Symphony Hall | Erato | (Note: S. Oramo–Erato (8573–85822–2) 2001) |
| 28 | Sir Colin Davis (2) | London Symphony Orchestra (4) | 2000 | 15:05 | Watford Town Hall | RCA Red Seal | (Note: C. Davis–RCA Red Seal (82876–55706–2) 2003) |
| 29 | Petri Sakari | Iceland Symphony Orchestra | 2000 | 14:01 | [unknown venue], Reykjavík | Naxos | (Note: P. Sakari–Naxos (8.555299) 2002) |
| 30 | Osmo Vänskä | Lahti Symphony Orchestra | 2000 | 13:10 | Sibelius Hall | BIS | (Note: O. Vänskä–BIS (CD–1225) 2002) |
| 31 | Sir Colin Davis (3) | Royal Concertgebouw Orchestra | 2002 | 14:29 | Concertgebouw | RCO Live | (Note: C. Davis–RCO Live (RCO 12004) 2012) |
| 32 | Leif Segerstam (2) | Helsinki Philharmonic Orchestra | 2004 | 14:24 | Finlandia Hall | Ondine | (Note: L. Segerstam–Ondine (ODE 1040–2) 2005) |
| 33 | Sir Colin Davis (4) | London Symphony Orchestra (5) | 2005 | 14:32 | Barbican Centre | LSO Live | (Note: C. Davis–LSO Live (LSO 0605) 2007) |
| 34 | Sir Mark Elder | Hallé Orchestra (2) | 2007 | 13:13 | Bridgewater Hall | Hallé | (Note: M. Elder–Hallé (CD HLL 7516) 2013) |
| 35 | Jukka-Pekka Saraste (2) | London Philharmonic Orchestra (2) | 2008 | 12:14 | Royal Festival Hall | LPO | (Note: J. Saraste–LPO (LPO–0057) 2011) |
| 36 | Hannu Lintu | Finnish Radio Symphony Orchestra (2) | 2014 | 13:43 | Helsinki Music Centre | Ondine | (Note: H. Lintu–Ondine (ODE 1262–5) 2015) |
| 37 | Edward Gardner | Bergen Philharmonic Orchestra | 2016 | 13:49 | Grieg Hall | Chandos | (Note: E. Gardner–Chandos (CHSA 5178) 2017) |
| 38 | Santtu-Matias Rouvali | Gothenburg Symphony Orchestra (3) | 2022 | 12:56 | Gothenburg Concert Hall | Alpha | (Note: S. Rouvali–Alpha (ALPHA 645) 2022) |

== Notes, references, and sources ==
Notes

Sources

- Dahlström, Fabian [in Swedish] (2003). Jean Sibelius: Thematisch-bibliographisches Verzeichnis seiner Werke [Jean Sibelius: A Thematic Bibliographic Index of His Works] (in German). Wiesbaden: Breitkopf & Härtel. ISBN 3-7651-0333-0.
