= Orchestral song =

The orchestral song (German Orchesterlied) is a late romantic genre of classical music for solo voices and orchestra.

== History ==
What was effectively song with instrumental accompaniment – the cantata and the aria – had been part of music since the early baroque. Beethoven and Schumann too had occasionally provided instrumental accompaniment to some songs. Full orchestration, to enable a song to "hold its own" in a 19th-century concert environment, developed from the 1840s. Among the earliest experiments with orchestral song are those of Liszt who orchestrated several of his songs in the 1840s but did not publish them. Liszt also had the operetta composer August Conradi orchestrate his Le juif errant and Jeanne d'Arc around 1848, but these too were neither published nor performed. Long after Berlioz' publication of his orchestrations of Les nuits d'été in 1856, Liszt finally published his own orchestration of Jeanne d'Arc au bûcher, as a dramatic scene for voice and orchestra in 1874. In Central Europe the form was brought to fruition by Mahler, to the extent that it is difficult to say where Mahler's symphonies end and where his symphonic songs begin.

== Single orchestral songs ==
The genre of orchestral song tends to longer programmed pieces than songs accompanied by piano. For this reason the orchestral song may be either a longer single song or, more commonly, a cycle. An example of a single long song text is found in Sibelius' tone poem Luonnotar. Other examples include Grieg's Den Bergtekne, op. 32. Hugo Wolf scored twenty-four of his songs for voice and orchestra, including Prometheus. Max Reger wrote many songs but only one orchestral song, An die Hoffnung (To Hope) on a poem by Hölderlin. The genre of the story-telling cantata continues alongside the orchestral song, as Poulenc's cantata Le bal masqué and La voix humaine, a one-act opera for one character.

== Orchestral song cycles ==
Berlioz' own orchestrations of his Les nuits d'été song cycle (1841) into orchestral songs (1856) are often regarded as the "first orchestral song cycle," though others consider it the first well known progenitor of the orchestral song. Later examples in France include Ravel's second work entitled Shéhérazade, a song cycle after three poems by Tristan Klingsor: Asie, La flûte enchantée, and L'indifférent (1903) and his cycle Don Quichotte à Dulcinée, and Chausson's Poème de l'amour et de la mer. Later examples include orchestral songs by Jean Cras and Jacques Ibert's 4 Chansons de Don Quichotte.

Notable examples of the orchestral song cycle in Germany and Austria include Richard Strauss' Vier letzte Lieder and several cycles by Gustav Mahler: Das Lied von der Erde, Des Knaben Wundernhorn; Lieder eines fahrenden Gesellen; and Kindertotenlieder. These models were influential on Alma Mahler-Werfel, Zemlinsky, Joseph Marx, Arnold Schoenberg, Max Reger, Othmar Schoeck, Pfitzner, and Frank Martin: 6 Monologe aus Jedermann. Paul von Klenau's Die Weise von Liebe und Tod des Kornetts Christoph Rilke (1918) and Gespräche mit dem Tod.

Aside from Grieg, Scandinavian examples include Ture Rangström's Swedish cycle Häxorna ("The Witches") (1938) Den Utvalda ("The Chosen"), Madetoja's Syksy-sarja (Autumn Song Cycle), Selim Palmgren's En sällsam fågel (a lonely bird) and Aamun autereessa (in the morning mist), Danish composer Peter Lange-Müller's orchestrations of his songs, and Erik Norby's Rilke-Lieder for mezzo-soprano and orchestra.

In Slavic lands examples include Glazunov and Rimsky-Korsakov's orchestrations of Musorgsky's four Songs and Dances of Death, Shostakovich's orchestral song cycles, such as From Jewish Folk Poetry, Romances on words by Japanese poets, Suite on Verses of Michelangelo Buonarroti (1974), also – to an extent – his Thirteenth "Babi Yar" (1962) and Fourteenth Symphonies. Władysław Żeleński and Karol Szymanowski in Polish, and in Czech Martinů's Magic Nights and Nipponari.

In British and American music examples of orchestral song cycles include Britten's cycles Nocturne (1958) Les Illuminations and Our Hunting Fathers. Ralph Vaughan Williams contributed the orchestration of his On Wenlock Edge, originally for voice, piano and optional string quartet. Other English orchestral songs include those by Delius, Hubert Parry, Charles Villiers Stanford, Finzi, John Ireland, Nimrod Borenstein, as well as posthumous orchestrations of Ivor Gurney's songs in arrangements by Gerald Finzi and Herbert Howells.
