= Glenda Goss =

American author and music historian

Glenda Dawn Goss is an American author and music historian whose special interests are music and culture, early modernism, critical editing, and European-American points of cultural contact. Her most notable work has revolved around the life and works of the Finnish composer, Jean Sibelius.

== Education ==
Goss studied musicology at the Université libre de Bruxelles with François Lesure and Robert Wangermée. She continued her studies at the University of North Carolina, where she completed a Ph.D. in musicology with a dissertation on the Renaissance composer Benedictus Appenzeller, the leading court musician for the Habsburg regent, Queen Mary of Hungary.

== Career ==
Glenda Dawn Goss began her teaching career at the University of Georgia and was promoted to full Professor. She won university-wide teaching awards (in 1986 and 1990) and served for some years as the head of the division of musicology. She has also taught at the University of Helsinki (1995–96) as a Fulbright professor. In 1998 she accepted an invitation to join the critical editing project, the Jean Sibelius Works, and served as the project's editor-in-chief from 2000 to 2004. A native of Saint Simons Island, one of Georgia's Golden Isles, she taught from 2012 to 2019 at the Sibelius Academy in Helsinki, Finland.

Goss is the author or editor of a number of respected books and articles on topics ranging from Renaissance music to music in the United States and scholarly editing. She has written on and performed the works of George Antheil, Bohuslav Martinů, and Igor Stravinsky.

In the area of Sibelius studies her contributions belong among the most important scholarship on this composer. These include the first scholarly editions of the composer's letters, the first full-scale reception history, and the critical edition of the seminal Kullervo symphony. Her book, Jean Sibelius and Olin Downes: Music, Friendship, Criticism (Northeastern Univ. 1995) was reviewed by Joseph Horowitz in the Times Literary Supplement. Jean Sibelius: A Guide to Research (Garland, 1998) was selected as the Outstanding Reference Book of the Year by the Music Library Association, whose jury described the Guide as "the Bible of Sibelius studies." In 2009 her biography, Sibelius: A Composer's Life and the Awakening of Finland, was published by the University of Chicago Press. In 2010 the volume received a Deems Taylor award from the American Society of Composers, Authors, and Publishers (ASCAP).

Goss is the recipient of numerous research awards from such organizations as The American-Scandinavian Foundation, the Paul Sacher Stiftung in Basel, Switzerland, and the National Endowment for the Humanities. She has also been honored with two Sibelius medals: Medal No. 17 (1996), awarded by the Sibelius Society of Hämeenlinna, Finland; and the Sibelius Medal awarded by the Sibelius Society of Finland (1997, and designed by Finnish sculptor Eila Hiltunen). In 1998 Goss received the Phi Kappa Award for contributions to American music. In the year 2000, she was given the Vincent Duckles Award.

In 2019 the Society of Swedish Literature in Finland (SLS) awarded Goss the Fredrik Pacius Prize for her wide range of Sibelius research, specifically citing her critical edition of Sibelius's Kullervo symphony and the 2009 biography for presenting "an engaged and clear-sighted view of Sibelius's life work for an international public with a deep understanding of its cultural and political context."

In the years 2016–2019 Glenda Dawn Goss completed a libretto, "All the Truths We Cannot See: A Story of Chernobyl." It has been composed into an opera by Finnish composer Uljas Pulkkis. Delayed by the outbreak of the COVID-19 epidemic, the opera received its world premiere in Helsinki on 15 March 2022, and its American premiere in Los Angeles on April 21, 2022. The performances were the collaborative efforts of the Sibelius Academy of Uniarts Helsinki and the University of Southern California Thornton School of Music.

Fellow Musicologist, Howard Pollack, dedicated his article, Samuel Barber, Jean Sibelius, and the Making of an American Romantic to Goss. The article appeared in Music Quarterly, vol. 84.

== Selected works ==
- Benedictus Appenzeller: Chansons. Edited with an Introduction by Glenda Goss Thompson. Monumenta Musica Neerlandica, vol. 14. Amsterdam: Vereniging voor Nederlandse Muziekgeschiedenis, 1982.
- Jean Sibelius and Olin Downes: Music, Friendship, Criticism. Boston: Northeastern University Press, 1995. ISBN 1-55553-200-4
- Jean Sibelius: Guide to Research. New York: Garland Press, 1998. ISBN 0-8153-1171-0
- Jean Sibelius: The Hämeenlinna Letters. Edited with Introduction and Commentary by Glenda D. Goss. English translations by Margareta Örtenblad Thompson. Espoo: Schildts, 1997. ISBN 951-50-0865-4
- Jean Sibelius: Kullervo. Edited with an Introduction and Critical Commentaries by Glenda Dawn Goss. Jean Sibelius Works, 4 vols. Wiesbaden: Breitkopf & Härtel, 2005.
- Music and the Moderns: The Life and Works of Carol Robinson. Metuchen, N.J. and London: Scarecrow Press, 1993. ISBN 0-8108-2626-7
- Paul Sjöblom. Finland from the Inside. Edited with an Introduction and Commentary by Glenda Dawn Goss. Helsinki: NewBridge Press, 2000. ISBN 951-98534-0-5
- Sibelius: A Composer's Life and the Awakening of Finland. Chicago and London: The University of Chicago Press, 2009. ISBN 0-226-30477-9
- The Sibelius Companion. Edited by Glenda Dawn Goss. Westport, Conn.: Greenwood Press, 1996. ISBN 0-313-28393-1
- Vieläkö lähetämme hänelle sikareja? Sibelius, Amerikka ja amerikkalaiset. Trans. from the English into Finnish by Martti Haapakoski. Helsinki: Werner Söderström Osakeyhtiö, 2009. ISBN 978-951-0-35517-6

== Radio series ==
- Sibelius and America. YLE (Finnish National Radio), 2008.
- Three Programs on American Music. YLE (Finnish National Radio), 1999.
- The Music of Jean Sibelius. Programs for "A Note for You." National Public Radio, Boston, Massachusetts, 1994.
