= 1880s in Finnish music =

The following is a list of notable events that occurred in the 1880s in Finnish music.

== Events ==
- unknown date, 1882
  - Martin Wegelius establishes the Helsingfors Musikinstitut, the forerunner of the Sibelius Academy.
  - Finnish composer Robert Kajanus founds the Helsinki Philharmonic Orchestra, Scandinavia's first permanent professional orchestra.

== New works ==
- 1885: Aino, symphonic poem by Robert Kajanus
- 1886: Piano Trio in A minor by Jean Sibelius
- 1887: Piano Trio in D major by Sibelius
- 1888: Piano Trio in C major by Sibelius
- 1889: String Quartet in A minor by Sibelius
- 1889-1890: String Quartet in B-flat major by Sibelius

== Births ==
- 7 July 1883: Toivo Kuula, composer and conductor
- 20 November 1883: Anna Hagelstam, mezzosoprano singer and songwriter
- 5 February 1884: Alma Kuula, operatic soprano and pianist
- 22 April 1884: Armas Launis, composer and ethnomusicologist
- 2 June 1884: Hanna Granfelt, operatic soprano
- 21 June 1885: Heino Kaski, composer, teacher and pianist
- 1887: Helge Lindberg, opera singer
- 17 February 1887: Leevi Madetoja, composer, music critic, conductor, and teacher
- 4 June 1887: Irma Tervani, contralto opera singer
- 31 August 1887: Kosti Vehanen, pianist and composer
- 14 October 1887: Ernest Pingoud, composer
- 20 November 1889: Karl Rautio, composer
