= Compositions for brass septet by Jean Sibelius =

Brass septets by Jean Sibelius (1889–1899)

Pieces for brass septet
- by Jean Sibelius
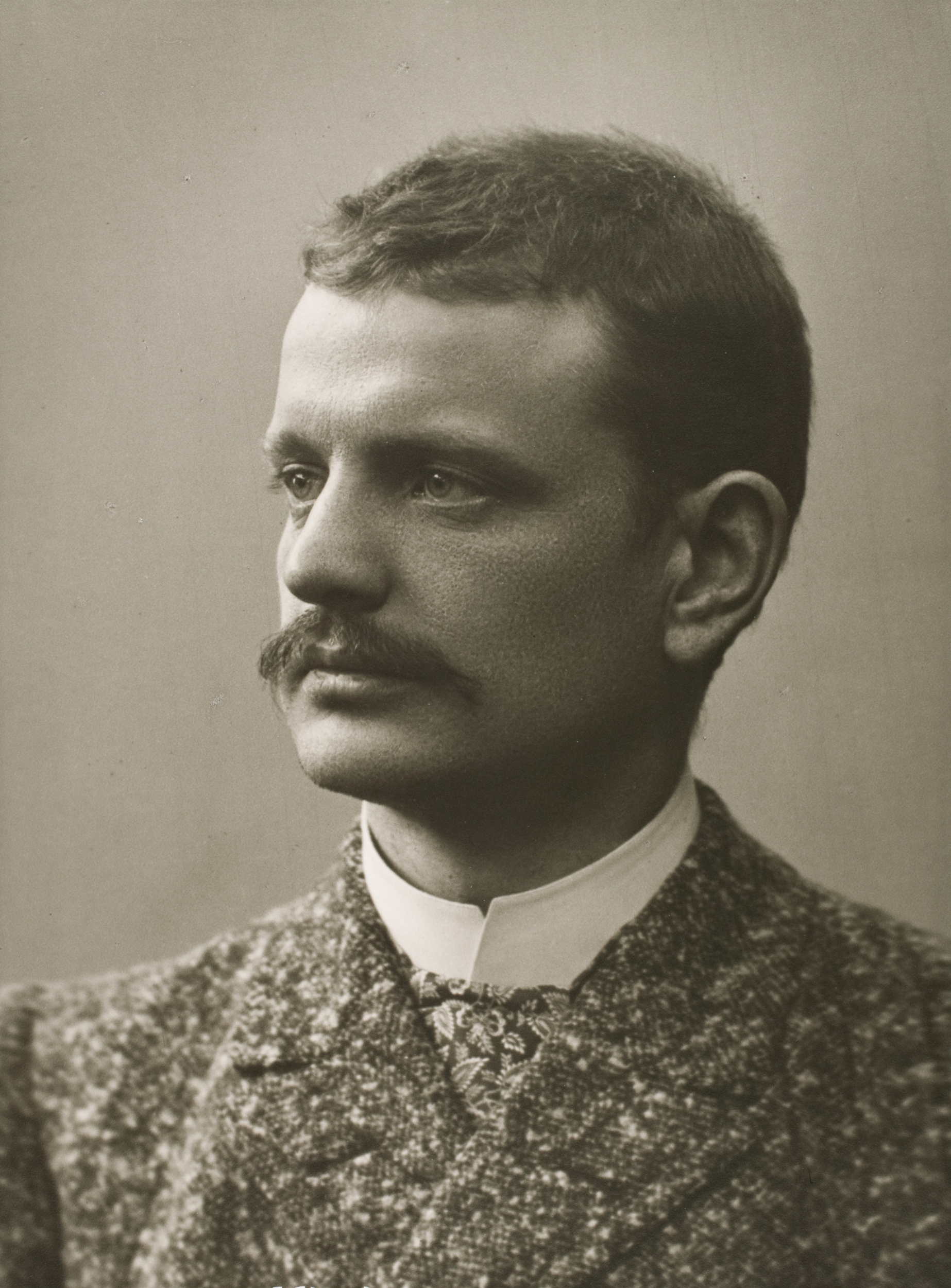
- The composer (c. 1891)
- Catalogue: JS 25, 45, 83, 146, 200
- Composed: 1889–1891, 1899
- Scoring: torviseitsikko

Early in his career from 1889 to 1899, the Finnish composer Jean Sibelius wrote six pieces for brass septet, (Note: Sibelius also arranged the Song of the Athenians (Atenarnes sång; Op. 31/3, 1899) for torviseitsikko, percussion, male choir, and boys' choir in 1899; this the German firm of Breitkopf & Härtel published in 1906. The original version of the Song of the Athenians is for male choir, boys' choir, and small orchestra. Sibelius made several other arrangements, as well: for solo piano; for male choir and boys' choir a cappella; for male choir, boys' choir, and piano; and for male choir, boys' choir, piano, and ad libitum harmonium. The piece is a setting of a poem by the Swedish poet Viktor Rydberg..) chronologically as follows: the Overture in F minor, JS 146 (1889); the Allegro in G minor, JS 25 (1889); the Andantino and Menuetto, JS 45 (1890); the Preludium (in Swedish: Förspel), JS 83 (1891); and Tiera, JS 200 (1899). Although Sibelius's pieces for brass septet have been recorded several times, they are relatively unknown.

== Instrumentation ==
All six pieces are scored for torviseitsikko (in Swedish: hornseptett), a "specifically Finnish" kind of brass septet that originated in 1870 (Note: Other sized brass ensembles, however, are known to have existed before 1870. For example, the Swedish brass sextet—comprising a soprano cornet (in E♭), cornet (in B♭), alto horn (in E♭), tenor horn (in B♭), valve trombone (in B♭), and tuba (in C)—was popular in Sweden and Norway, and may have been a model for the Finnish torviseitsikko. Moreover, in Finland during the 1850s and 1860s, amateur brass quartets, quintets, and sextets had been common.) when the Finnish composer, music arranger, and military band leader Adolf Leander founded the first torviseitsikko within the Guards' Band, (Note: Credit for the creation of the torviseitsikko is occasionally given to Leader's assistant, Antti Ahonen.) the premiere ensemble of the Finnish Defense Forces (then in service to the Russian tsar, Alexander II). The standard consists of the following instruments:

- 1 soprano cornet (in E♭), 1 alto horn (in E♭), and 1 tuba (in E♭)
- 1 euphonium (in B♭)
- 2 cornets (in B♭) and 1 tenor horn (in B♭)

At the time, it was typical to place the euphonium in the center, with the E♭ instruments grouped to one side and the B♭ instruments grouped to the other. A torviseitsikko can also include percussion ad libitum. Indeed, both the Allegro and the Preludium include parts for triangle, while Tiera calls for bass drum and cymbals.

== History ==
=== Composition ===
On 29 May 1889, Sibelius graduated from the Helsinki Music Institute, the star pupil of the institute's director, Martin Wegelius. That summer, the Sibelius family vacationed for the second straight year at the seaside resort town of Loviisa, staying in the home of his paternal grandmother and aunt. Breaking with his habit from the previous three summers, Sibelius at this point did not produce a new piano trio; (Note: The previous three summers had resulted in: the Piano Trio, Hafträsk in A minor (JS 207, 1886); the Piano Trio, Korpo in D major (JS 209, 1887); and the Piano Trio, Lovisa in C major (JS 208, 1888).) rather, he wrote a flurry of new works, including his first composition for torviseitsikko: the Overture in F minor. This piece Sibelius probably composed for his friend, the German-born horn player and band leader Christian Haupt, (Note: Haupt (1844 – 1912), like many other German musicians, had made a living in Finland, the music performance and educational institutions of which in the nineteenth century were still in their infancy and, therefore, had not yet trained enough homegrown talent to meet demand. In 1868, Haupt was employed as a horn player for the orchestra of the Swedish Theatre in Helsinki. He was recalled to Germany for military service during the Franco-Prussian War, during which he was wounded. In 1882, he returned to Helsinki and played horn in the Helsinki Orchestral Society, Finland's first permanent orchestra, which the Finnish conductor and composer Robert Kajanus had founded the same year.) who in 1888 had become the kapellmeister in Loviisa. In this role, his duties included conducting the septet attached to the local volunteer fire brigade. No evidence, however, has been found indicating that the Overture was performed in Sibelius's lifetime.

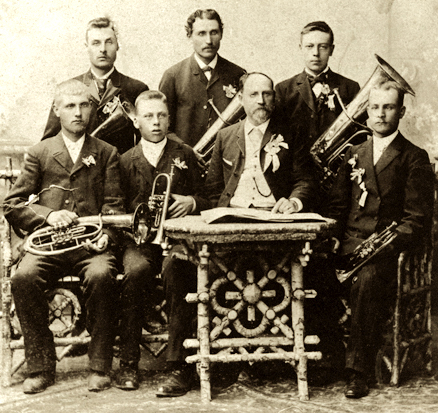
The Loviisa torviseitsikko directed by Christian Haupt (seated at table), for whom Sibelius composed most of his septet pieces

With arrival of fall, Sibelius set out in September 1889 for Berlin, where he would continue his music studies (now as a post-graduate) under the German composer Albert Becker. Nevertheless, Sibelius found time to compose more personal works on the side, one of which was his second piece for torviseitsikko: the Allegro in G minor. This piece Sibelius wrote for a competition held by the Finnish Society for Popular Education (in Finnish: Kansanvalistusseura), which in December 1888 had run an advertisement in the music magazine Säveleitä promoting a contest for new torviseitsikko compositions; the primary requirement was that the entry be a "fantasy" (rather than an arrangement) of a Finnish folk song. Sibelius's Allegro, which he submitted under the pseudonymous initialism 'n–l–s' (for Jea – N • Sibe – L – iu – S) made use of two songs: Hevonen kuin koirasteeri and Tuomi on virran reunalla. However, the Allegro failed to win the prize of 500 Finnish markka, perhaps because the three judges—the organist, composer, and professor Richard Faltin; the conductor Ernst Schnéevoigt; and Leander—concluded it was "far too difficult and therefore impractical for amateur bandsmen".

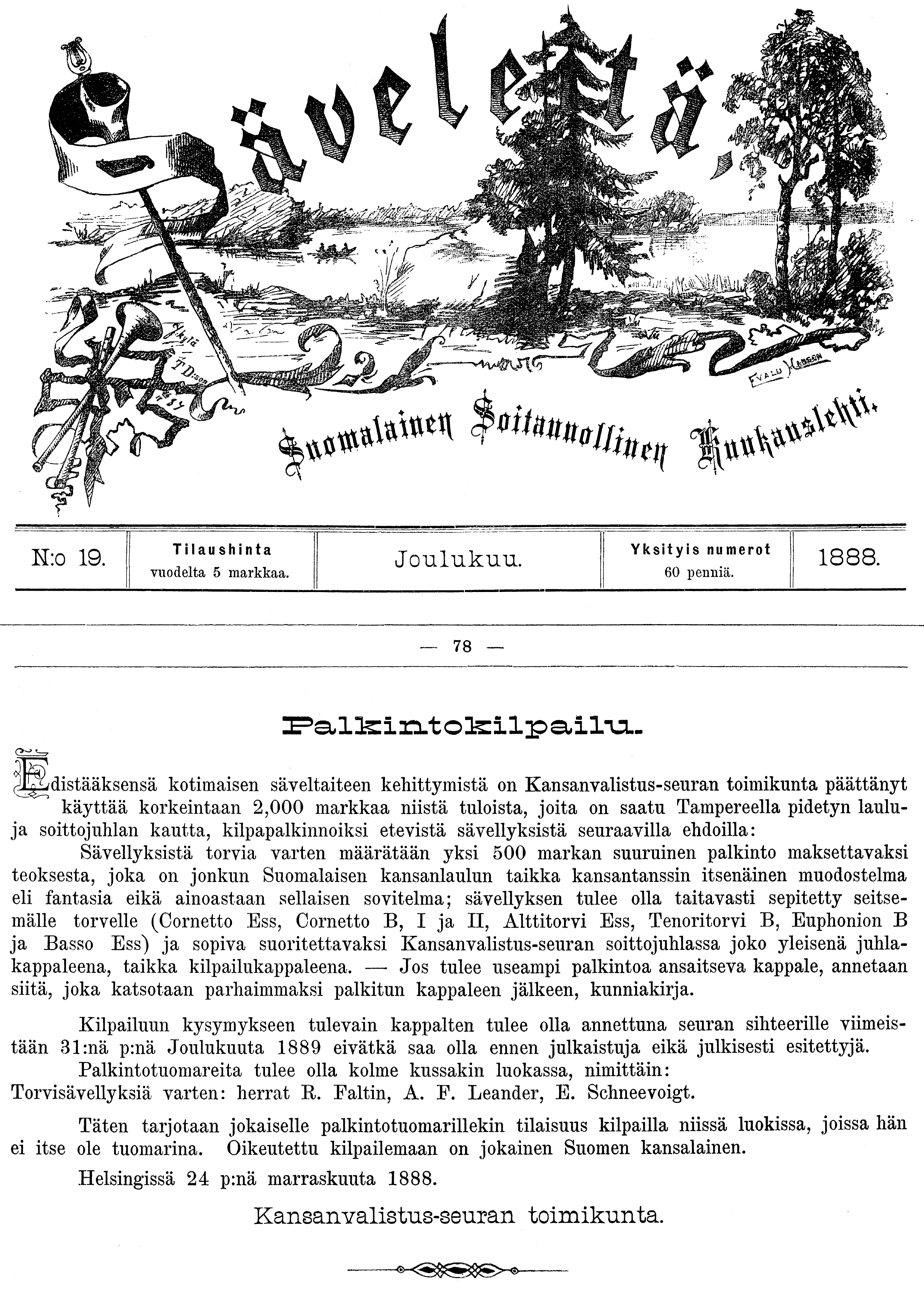
An ad promoting a brass septet competition, to which Sibelius submitted his Allegro without result

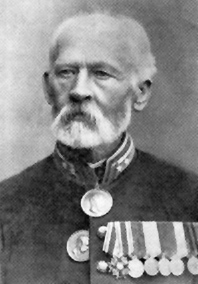
The military band leader Adolf Leander founded the first torviseitsikko within the Guards' Band

Sibelius wrote the Andantino and Menuetto, his third and fourth compositions for torviseitsikko, while staying in Loviisa during the summer of 1890; as with the Overture from the previous year, the new pieces were intended for Haupt's septet. This was a period of transition for the young composer, as two momentous decisions soon followed: in September, he and Aino Järnefelt secretly engaged; moreover, he selected Vienna for his second year of post-graduate study (where he eventually apprenticed under the Hungarian composer Karl Goldmark and the Austrian composer Robert Fuchs). At this time, Sibelius turned seriously to the task of orchestral composition, (Note: For example, he wrote his first two such works in the genre, the Overture in E major (JS 145) and the Scène d'ballet (JS 163); moreover, he was laboring on the choral symphony Kullervo (Op. 7), the successful premiere of which in April 1892 would make him a national hero.) and his production of chamber music decreased dramatically. One of the few new chamber pieces to defy this general metamorphosis of artistic expression, however, was a fifth composition for torviseitsikko, the Preludium, which he composed in Loviisa during the summer of 1891, again for Haupt's band.

Sibelius's final piece for torviseitsikko is the "tone picture" Tiera, which arrived in eight years later in 1899. (A minor character in the Finland's national epic, the Kalevala, Tiera is a comrade of the amorous, swashbuckling hero Lemminkäinen.) The Finnish musicologist Kari Kilpeläinen has speculated that Sibelius may originally may intended Tiera as part of the Music for the Press Celebrations Days (JS 137, 1899), the occasional score from which the composer subsequently excerpted Finlandia and the Scènes historiques I. Tiera was the only of Sibelius brass septet pieces to be published in his lifetime, which the Society for Popular Education printed in 1900 and paired with another piece for torviseitsikko, Aamulla varhain (Early in the Morning, 1900) by Sibelius's brother-in-law, the Finnish composer and conductor Armas Järnefelt. (Note: Armas Järnefelt wrote four original compositions for torviseitsikko: Virran rannalla (By the Stream, 1896), Kesäyö (Summer Night, 1898), Aamulla varhain (Early in the Morning, 1900), and Topografikunnan marssi (March of the Topography Corps, 1932).)

=== Neglect and publication ===
Sibelius's remaining five pieces were relegated to "almost a century of obscurity", forgotten and unplayed, until their rediscovery in the 1980s: the Overture, Antantino, Menuetto, and Preludium were among the manuscripts that the Sibelius family donated in 1982 to the University of Helsinki Library, while the Finnish horn player and music educator Holger Fransman in 1987 located the Allegro within the archives of Haupt's Loviisa septet. A year later, Fransman arranged the Preludium, Andantino, and Menuetto as the so-called "Petite Suite for Brass Septet", respectively, as movements Nos. 1–3; this Fazer Music (now Fennica Gehrman) published in 1988, along with the first edition of the Overture. The Allegro, however, remains in manuscript.

== Music ==
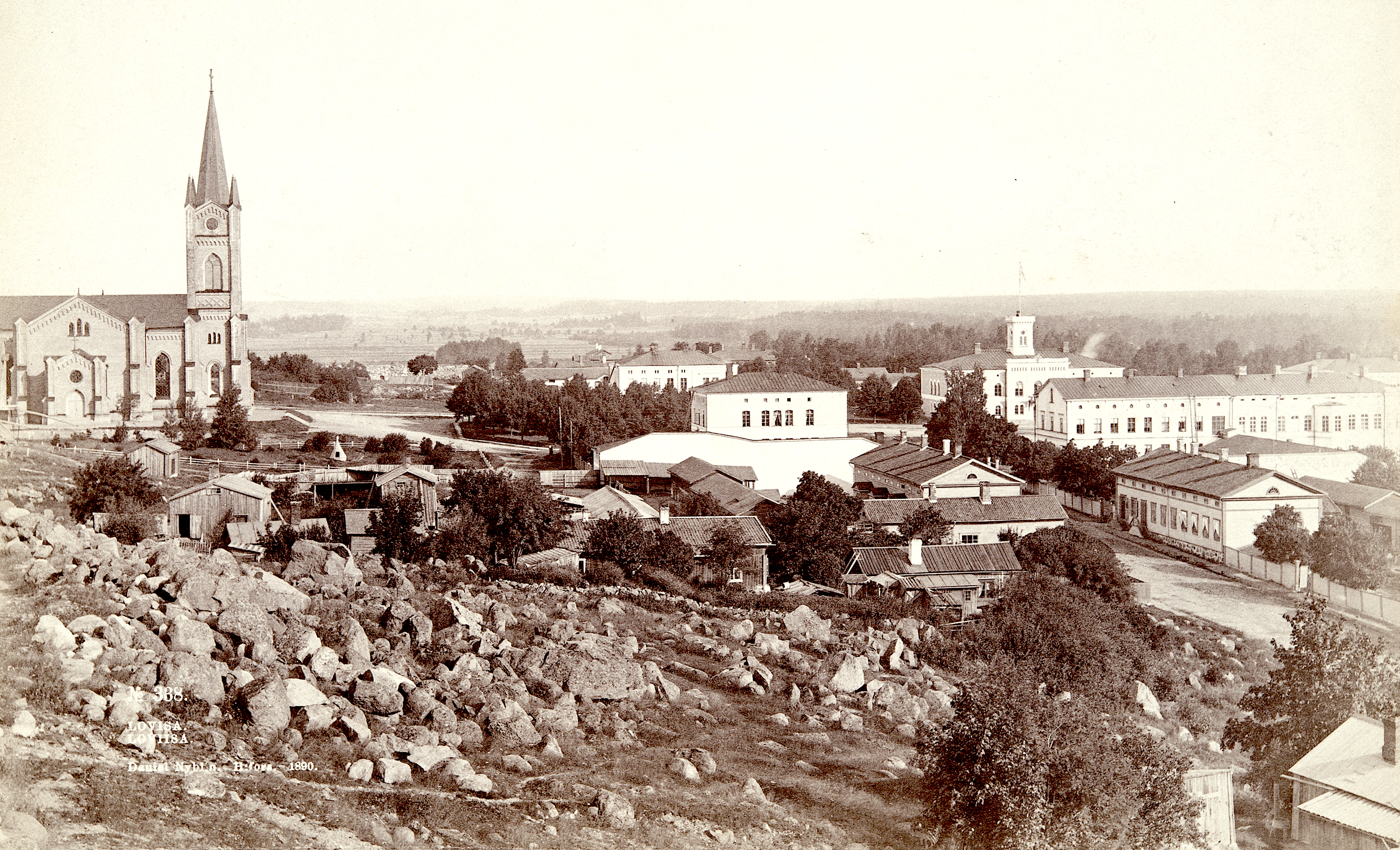
Hilltop view of the Finnish municipality Loviisa in 1890, where at Sibelius frequently summered

=== Overture (JS 146) ===
The Overture in F minor, marked Allegro, is in 4/4 time and has a duration of about 11 minutes.

=== Allegro (JS 25) ===
The Allegro in G minor is in 3/4 time and has a duration of about five minutes.

=== Andantino and Menuetto (JS 45) ===
The Andantino and Menuetto are each in 3/4 time; together, they have a duration of about five minutes.

=== Preludium (JS 83) ===
The Preludium is in 4/4 time and has a duration of about five minutes.

=== Tiera (JS 200) ===
The Tiera, marked Non troppo lento – Alla marcia, is in 4/4 time and has a duration of about four minutes.

== Discography ==
External audio
- Performed by the Finnish Brass Ensemble
- Overture in F minor, JS 146
- Allegro, JS 25
- Andantino, JS 45/1
- Menuetto, JS 45/2
- Preludium, JS 83
- Tiera, JS 200

The Swedish conductor Lars-Gunnar Björklund and the Solna Brass made the world premiere studio recording of the Overture and the "Petite Suite" (using Fazer's the arrangements by Fransman), as well as of the Allegro (then in manuscript) in 1990 for Oompah Records. Although the ensemble also recorded Tiera, this was preceded by an earlier performance by the Estonian-American conductor Neeme Järvi and the Gothenburg Symphony Orchestra in 1989 for BIS. The sortable table below lists these and other commercially available recordings of Sibelius's works for torviseitsikko:

No.	Ensemble	Director	Runtimes (Note: All runtimes are official, as printed on CD or LP liner notes.)						Rec. (Note: Refers to the year in which the performers recorded the work; this may not be the same as the year in which the recording was first released to the general public.)	Recording venue	Label	Ref.
No.	Ensemble	Director	JS 146	JS 25	JS 45/1	JS 45/2	JS 83	JS 200	Rec.	Recording venue	Label	Ref.
1	Gothenburg Symphony Orchestra	Neeme Järvi	—N/a	—N/a	—N/a	—N/a	—N/a	4:55	1989	Gothenburg Concert Hall	BIS	(Note: Gothenburg SO–BIS (CD–448) 1989)
2	Solna Brass	Lars-Gunnar Björklund	8:36	5:05	4:12	1:25	4:43	3:55	1990	Swedish Radio Studio 2, Stockholm	Oompah	(Note: Solna Brass–Oompah (OCD 902) 1990)
3	London Gabrieli Brass Ensemble	Christopher Larkin	8:35	4:42	2:57	1:34	3:58	—N/a	1990	[Unknown]	Hyperion	(Note: London Gabrieli Brass–Hyperion (CDA66470) 1991)
4	Finnish Brass Ensemble	Jukka-Pekka Saraste	8:27	4:51	3:51	1:49	3:49	3:50	1993	Kulttuuritalo	Alba	(Note: Finnish Brass Ensemble–Alba (ABCD 102) 1994)
5	Brass Partout	Hermann Bäumer	8:18	4:26	3:08	1:37	3:55	4:19	1999	Furuby Church	BIS	(Note: Brass Partout–BIS (CD–1054) 2000)
6	Wallace Collection	John Wallace	—N/a	—N/a	2:14	1:36	3:23	3:26	2000	St Paul's Church, Rusthall	Deux-Elles	(Note: Wallace Collection–Deux-Elles (DXL 1042) 2001)
7	Brass Septet Imperial	—N/a	8:57	4:40	3:13	2:07	3:51	4:25	2015	[Unknown]	Pilfink	(Note: Brass Septet Imperial–Pilfink (JJVCD–152) 2015)

In general, Sibelius's torviseitsikko works have been well received. In a review of BIS's 2000 recording, Jed Distler of Classics Today wrote that the "six Sibelius selections are well-crafted occasional pieces, the only exception being the Weber-like Overture in F minor"; he further complimented Brass Partout for its "technical refinement and pinpointed nuance that will either inspire or depress rank and file brass players". Ivan March for Gramophone praised the Hyperion recording, describing the Sibelius tracks as "the real find" of the disc: "They are entirely uncharacteristic, but have genuine charm". He continued by characterizing each individual piece: the Allegro as "fresh and somewhat folksy, yet quite expansive'; the Andantino as "simple hymn-like melody"; the Menuetto as "very jolly"; the " colourful and rhythmically catchy" Preludium as the "most winning piece" of the set; and, tepidly, the Overture as "less memorable, but agreeable enough". In contrast to Distler and March, Gerald Fenech for MusicWeb International reviewed the Overture positively.

== Notes, references, and sources ==
=== Sources ===
==== Books ====
- Barnett, Andrew (2007). Sibelius. New Haven: Yale University Press. ISBN 978-0-300-11159-0.
- Dahlström, Fabian [in Finnish] (2003). Jean Sibelius: Thematisch-bibliographisches Verzeichnis seiner Werke [Jean Sibelius: A Thematic Bibliographic Index of His Works] (in German). Wiesbaden: Breitkopf & Härtel. ISBN 3-7651-0333-0.
- Holmes, Michael (2010). "Jean Sibelius's Works for torviseitsikko and the Brass Septet Tradition in Finland". In Jackson, Timothy; Murtomäki, Veijo [in Finnish]; Davis, Colin; Virtanen, Timo (eds.). Sibelius in the Old and New World: Aspects of His Music, Its Interpretation, and Reception. Frankfurt am Main; New York: Peter Lang. ISBN 978-3-631-56025-9.

==== Liner notes ====
- Hautala, Harri (1994). Charm & Passion of Youth: Early Works for Brass – Sibelius / Meriläinen / Rautavaara (CD booklet). Jukka-Pekka Saraste & Finnish Brass Ensemble. Alba. ABCD 102.
- Larkin, Christopher (1991). Original 19th Century Music for Brass: Cherubini / Beethoven / Dvorák / Lachner / David / Sibelius / Rimsky-Korsakov (CD booklet). Christopher Larkin & London Gabrieli Brass Ensemble. Hyperion. CDA66470.
- Solna Brass; Lars-Gunnar Björklund (1990). Brass and Drums - A 20 Year Celebration Record (CD booklet). Stockholm: Oompah Records. OCD 902.

==== Journals and magazines ====
- Karjalainen, Kauko (1997). "The Brass Band Tradition in Finland" (PDF). Historic Brass Society Journal. 9: 83–96.

==== Websites ====
- Distler, Jed (2000). "Playgrounds for Angels: Nordic Music for Brass". classicstoday.com. Classics Today.
- Fenech, Gerald (2000). "Playgrounds for Angels: Works by Rautavaara, Sibelius, Grieg and Nystedt". musicweb-international.com. MusicWeb International.
- March, Ivan. "Original 19th Century Music for Brass". gramophone.co.uk. Gramophone.
