= Cajanus (family) =

Ancient Finnish priestly family

The Cajanus family is an ancient Finnish priestly family emerging during the late Middle Ages that has produced numerous clergymen, government officials, and academics. Count Per Brahe nominated the progenitor of the family, a local nimismies Anders Eriksson (Hjerta), to serve as bailiff of his fiefdom of Kajaani. His sons became pastors in neighbouring parishes and the family assumed a Latinate surname derived from the name of the town of Kajaani.

Members of this family include:

1. Daniel Cajanus (1703–1749) a world-famous giant who was a member of royal courts and performed in England and Holland.
2. Juhana Cajanus (1655–1681), professor and hymnwriter, graduated with an M.A. from Uppsala in 1679, appointed as professor of philosophy at Turku Academy in 1680.
3. Erik Cajanus (1658–1723), Priest of Paltamo
4. Juhana Fredrik Cajan (1815–1887), historian
5. Robert Kajanus (1856–1933), Finnish conductor and composer
6. Werner Cajanus (1878–1919), professor and inventor, first professor of forest inventory in Finland
