= Vehanen =

Vehanen is a Finnish surname. Notable people with the surname include:

- Kosti Vehanen (1887–1957), Finnish pianist and composer
- Petri Vehanen (born 1977), Finnish ice hockey player
