= Ljuba Bielefeld =

Lithuanian composer

- Born: 24 June 1877; Kaunas
- Occupation: Composer

Ljuba Bielefeld (also known as Ljubow, Lubow, Louba Bielefeldt; née Bachrach; 24 June 1877 – after 1931) was a Lithuanian composer. She was the daughter of a Jewish merchant. She trained in Berlin, studying under Ernst Jedliczka, Ludwig Bußler, and Franz Mannstaedt. She married a banker, and lived with her family in Weisbaden. Her works were performed in Wiesbaden, and published in Frankfurt am Main by Firnberg.

== Life ==
Ljuba Bachrach was born on 24 June 1877 in Kowno in the Russian Empire (present day Kaunas, Lithuania). She was the daughter of Jewish merchant Aron Gdaljewicz Bachrach. She married banker Hermann Bielefeld in 1901, after which she lived in Wiesbaden.

Bielefeld studied music under Ernst Jedliczka, Ludwig Bußler, and Franz Mannstaedt. It is likely she was trained in Berlin, but she was not recorded as a student of the Stern Conservatory. Bielefeld's works Adagio and Valse amoreuse were performed in Wiesbaden in 1908, under the direction of Ugo Affernis. Her first work was published in 1908 by Firnberg in Frankfurt am Main. Bielefeld's husband's bank was liquidated circa 1916, they and their two children moved to Aachen. Following her divorce in 1931, Bielefeld's fate is unknown.

== Works ==
Bielefeld's compositions include an orchestral suite, a string quartet and romance for strings, piano sonatas and a piano suite and burlesque. Her burlesque is dedicated to Joseph Pembaur. Bielefeld also wrote a romance for cello. Published works include Dämmerstunde (Crépuscule), Suite (Steppe’-Step) and Burlesken.

== Published works ==
- Dämmerstunde (Crépuscule). Frankfurt: Firnberg, 1909.
- Suite (Steppe'-Step). Berlin: Ries & Erler, 1925.
- Burlesken (Joseph Pembaur angebracht) (Kl.). Berlin: Ries & Erler, 1926.
