= Piano Trio in A minor (Sibelius) =

Piano trio by Jean Sibelius (1886)

- Hafträsk
- by Jean Sibelius
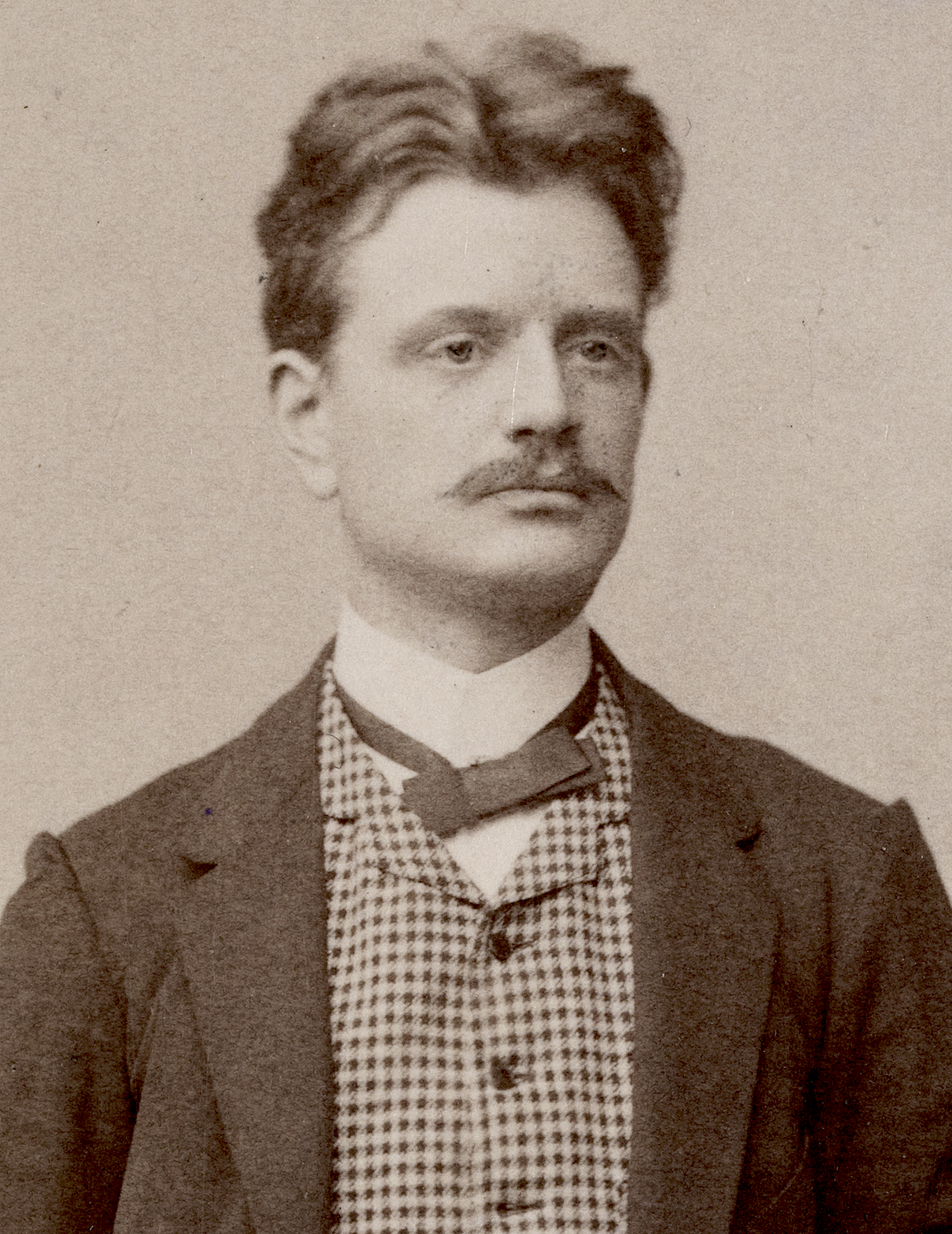
- The composer (c. 1885–1888)
- Catalogue: JS 207
- Composed: 1886
- Duration: 21 mins.
- Movements: 4

The Piano Trio in A minor, Hafträsk, JS 207, is a four-movement chamber piece for violin, cello, and piano written in the summer of 1886 by the Finnish composer Jean Sibelius. The trio derives its nickname from the small village of Hafträsk on Norrskata, an island located in the Turku archipelago, at which the Sibelius family vacationed in 1886. Immediately upon its completion, Sibelius substantially revised the first movement; this version, however, is fragmentary, although the cello part is complete.

== Structure ==
The A minor trio is in four movements, as follows:

1. Allegro maestoso
2. Andantino
3. Scherzo. Vivace
4. Rondo. [without tempo marking]

The Hafträsk Trio remains in manuscript.

== Discography ==
The Finnish musicians Jaakko Kuusisto (violin), Marko Yltinen (cello), and Folke Gräsbeck (piano) made the world premiere studio recording of the Hafträsk Trio in 2002 for BIS. The table below lists this and other commercially available recordings:

No.	Violin	Cello	Piano	Runtime (Note: All runtimes are official, as printed on CD or LP liner notes.)	Rec. (Note: Refers to the year in which the performers recorded the work; this may not be the same as the year in which the recording was first released to the general public.)	Recording venue	Label	Ref.
1	Jaakko Kuusisto	Marko Yltinen	Folke Gräsbeck	21:59	2002	Danderyds gymnasium	BIS	(Note: Kuusisto, Yltinen, Gräsbeck–BIS (CD–1282) 2004)
2	Petteri Iivonen	Samuli Peltonen	Juho Pohjonen	19:34	2016	Segerstrom Center for the Arts	Yarlung	(Note: Sibelius Piano Trio–Yarlung (YAR54763) 2016)

== Notes, references, and sources ==
Notes

Sources

- Barnett, Andrew (2007). Sibelius. New Haven: Yale University Press. ISBN 978-0-300-11159-0.
- Dahlström, Fabian [in Swedish] (2003). Jean Sibelius: Thematisch-bibliographisches Verzeichnis seiner Werke [Jean Sibelius: A Thematic Bibliographic Index of His Works] (in German). Wiesbaden: Breitkopf & Härtel. ISBN 3-7651-0333-0.
