= Siegfried Dehn =

German musicologist (1799–1858)

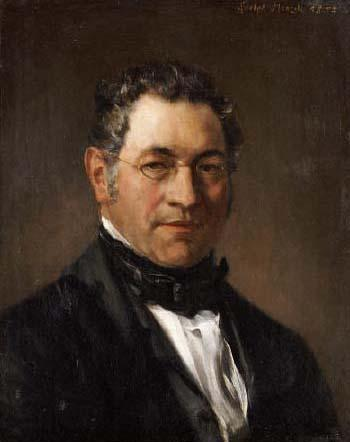
Portrait by Adolph Menzel (1854)

Siegfried Wilhelm (von) Dehn (24 or 25 February 1799 – 12 April 1858) was a German music theorist, editor, teacher and librarian.

Born in Altona, Dehn was the son of a banker and learned to play the cello as a boy. Intent on becoming a diplomat, he studied law in Leipzig but also took music lessons from J. A. Dröbs. While attached to the Swedish embassy in Berlin, Dehn developed an interest in musical research, studying with Bernhard Klein. He was left destitute by the failure of the family bank in 1830 and decided to devote himself to music; he soon became known and respected widely as a musical theorist and teacher.

In 1842, composer Giacomo Meyerbeer recommended Dehn to fill the post of custodian of the Prussian royal library. Dehn threw himself into cataloging the collection, bringing it into order and adding to it copiously from libraries all over Prussia. Among the collections he amassed were those of Anton Schindler and Georg Pölchau; the latter was especially notable for its manuscripts by Johann Sebastian Bach and Carl Philipp Emanuel Bach. Dehn was also editor of Cäcilia from 1842 to 1848 and professor of the Royal Academy of the Arts from 1849. On the death of Friedrich Konrad Griepenkerl in 1849, Dehn helped edit J.S. Bach's instrumental music for the Peters Edition. He was responsible for, among other works, the first publishing of the Brandenburg concertos. He also edited a large number of Lassus motets.

Dehn was widely respected as a teacher. His students included Albert Becker, Ludwig Bussler, Peter Cornelius, Mikhail Glinka, Heinrich Hofmann, Gustav Nottebohm, and Anton Rubinstein. See: List of music students by teacher: C to F#Siegfried Dehn.

He died in Berlin.

== Works ==
- Theoretisch-praktische Harmonielehre mit angefügten Generalbaßbeispielen, Berlin, 1840
- Analyse dreier Fugen von S. Bach und einer Vocalfuge von A. M. Bononcini's, 1858
- Lehre vom Contrapunkt, Canon und Fuge, 1859
- Orlandus Lassus Psalmi VII poenitentiales o.J. (Hg.)
- 12 Hefte mehrstimmiger Gesänge des 16. und 17. Jahrhunderts, o.J. (Hg.)

Editions

- Bach, J. S., [BWV 211] Joh. Seb. Bach. Komische Cantaten. No. I. Schlendrian mit seiner Tochter Liefsgen (Coffee-Cantate:). Herausgegeben von S. W. Dehn. Interdum et Socrates equitabat arundine longa, [ca. 1830], 31 pp. (Partitur)
- Bach, Johann Sebastian (1685–1750), [BWV 1042], Deuxieme Concerto en Mi majeur pour le Violon avec Accompagnament de deux Violons, Viola et Basse…, publie pour la premiere fois par S. W. Dehn [Partitur]. Leipzig, Peters (V. Nr. 3888) [ca. 1875]. 20 lithogr.

== Bibliography ==
- Warrack, John and James Deaville, ed. Stanley Sadie, "Dehn, Siegfried (Wilhelm)," The New Grove Dictionary of Music and Musicians, Second Edition (London: Macmilian, 2001), 29 vols. ISBN 0-333-60800-3.
