= String Quartet in A minor (Sibelius) =

String quartet by Jean Sibelius (1889)

- by Jean Sibelius
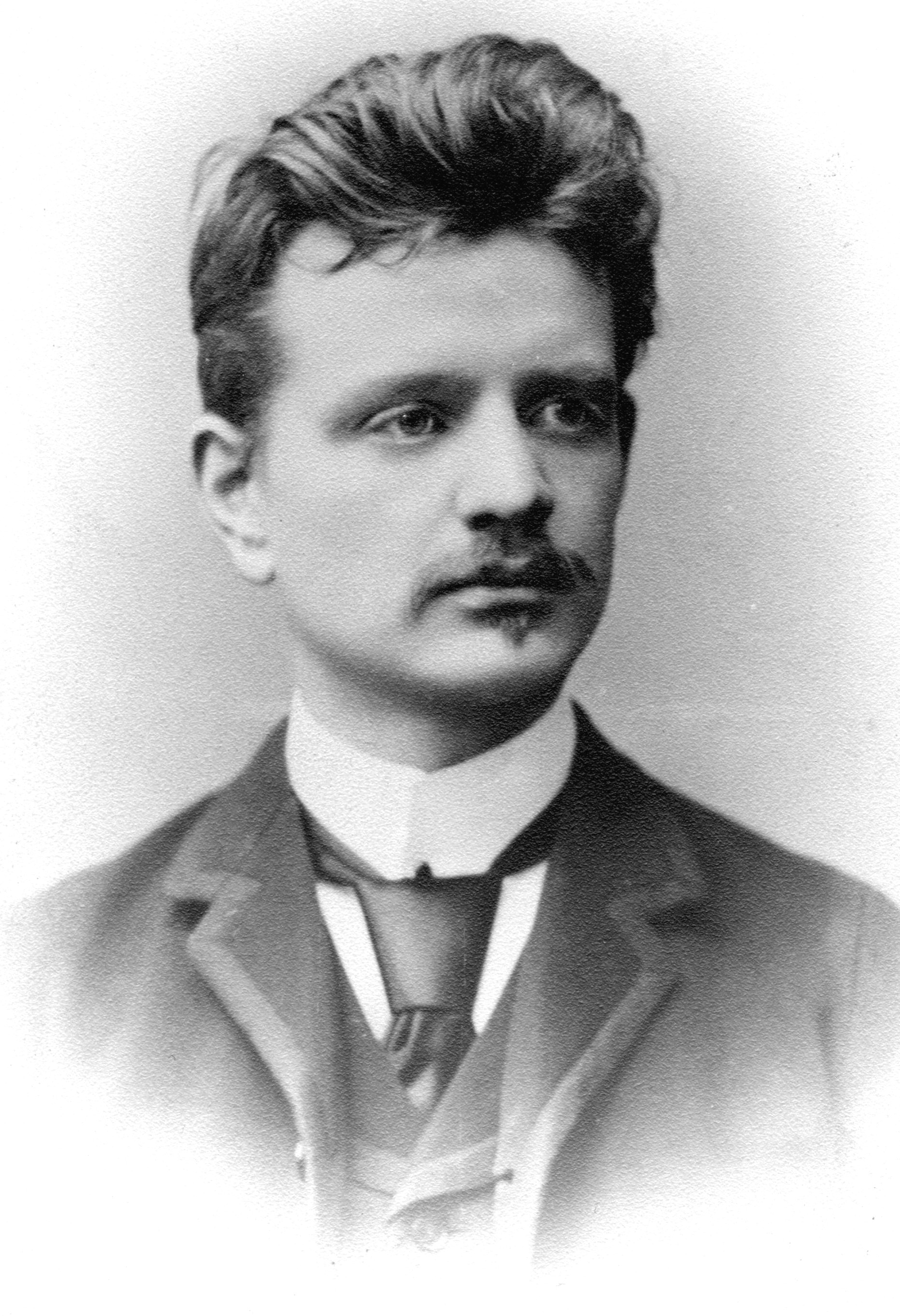
- The composer in 1889
- Catalogue: JS 183
- Composed: 1889
- Publisher: Fazer (1991)
- Duration: 28 mins.
- Movements: 4

Premiere
- Date: 29 May 1889
- Location: Helsinki, Grand Duchy of Finland
- Performers: Herman Csillag (violin); Wilhelm Santé (violin); Karl Wasenius (viola); Wilhelm Renck (cello)

The String Quartet in A minor, JS 183, is a four-movement string quartet written in 1889 by the Finnish composer Jean Sibelius. It is the second of Sibelius's four string quartets. The initial finale was the Fugue (JS 85) that Sibelius had written as an academic exercise at the Helsinki Music Institute under the direction of his teacher, Martin Wegelius.

The A minor Quartet received its premiere in Helsinki on 29 May 1889 at the Helsinki Music Institute (now the Sibelius Academy); the performers were Herman Csillag (violin), Wilhelm Santé (violin), Karl Wasenius (viola), and Wilhelm Renck (cello).

== Structure ==
The A minor Quartet is in four movements, as follows:

1. Andante – Allegro
2. Adagio ma non tanto
3. Vivace
4. Allegro

The piece was published posthumously in 1991 by Fazer Music.

The first movement begins with an Andante in 6/4 time before switching to 4/4 for the Allegro. It has a duration of about nine minutes.

The second movement, marked Adagio ma non tanto, is in 9/8 time; it has a duration of about seven minutes.

The third movement, marked Vivace, is in 3/4 time; it has a duration of about five minutes.

The fourth movement, marked Allegro, is in 4/4 time; it has a duration of about seven minutes.

== Discography ==
The Sibelius Academy Quartet made the world premiere studio recording of the A minor Quartet for Finlandia in 1985. The sortable table below lists this and other commercially available recordings:

No.	Quartet	Violin I	Violin II	Viola	Cello	Runtime (Note: All runtimes are official, as printed on CD or LP liner notes.)	Rec. (Note: Refers to the year in which the performers recorded the work; this may not be the same as the year in which the recording was first released to the general public.)	Recording venue	Label	Ref.
1	Sibelius Academy	Seppo Tukiainen	Erkki Kantola	Veikko Kosonen	Arto Noras	28:22	1984	Convent Church, Naantali	Finlandia	(Note: Sibelius Academy–Finlandia (4509–95851–2) 1992)
2	Sophisticated Ladies	Ulrika Jansson	Annette Mannheimer	Mona Bengtsson	Åsa Forsberg	35:10	1989	Petrus Church, Stocksund	BIS	(Note: Sophisticated Ladies–BIS (CD–463) 1989)
3	Jean Sibelius	Yoshiko Arai	Jukka Pohjola	Teemu Kupiainen	Seppo Kimanen	31:12	1991	Roihuvuoren kirkko	Ondine	(Note: Jean Sibelius–Ondine (ODE 773-2) 1991)
4	Tempera	Laura Vikman	Silva Koskela	Tiila Kangas	Ulla Lampela	34:20	2005	Länna Church, Uppland	BIS	(Note: Tempera–BIS (CD–1476) 2006)
5	Flinders	Helen Ayres	Shane Chen	Helen Ireland	Zoe Knighton	30:20	2015	Wyselaskie Auditorium	ABC Classics	(Note: Flinders—ABC Classics (ABC 481 1982) 2015)
6	Leipzig	Conrad Munk	Tilman Büning	Ivo Bauer	Matthias Moosdorf	33:39	2016	Abtei Marienmünster	MDG	(Note: Leipzig—MDG (MDG 307 1957-2) 2016)

== Notes, references, and sources ==
Notes

Sources

- Barnett, Andrew (2007). Sibelius. New Haven: Yale University Press. ISBN 978-0-300-11159-0.
- Dahlström, Fabian [in Swedish] (2003). Jean Sibelius: Thematisch-bibliographisches Verzeichnis seiner Werke [Jean Sibelius: A Thematic Bibliographic Index of His Works] (in German). Wiesbaden: Breitkopf & Härtel. ISBN 3-7651-0333-0.
