= Lea Piltti =

Finnish soprano (1904–1982)

Professori Lea Piltti
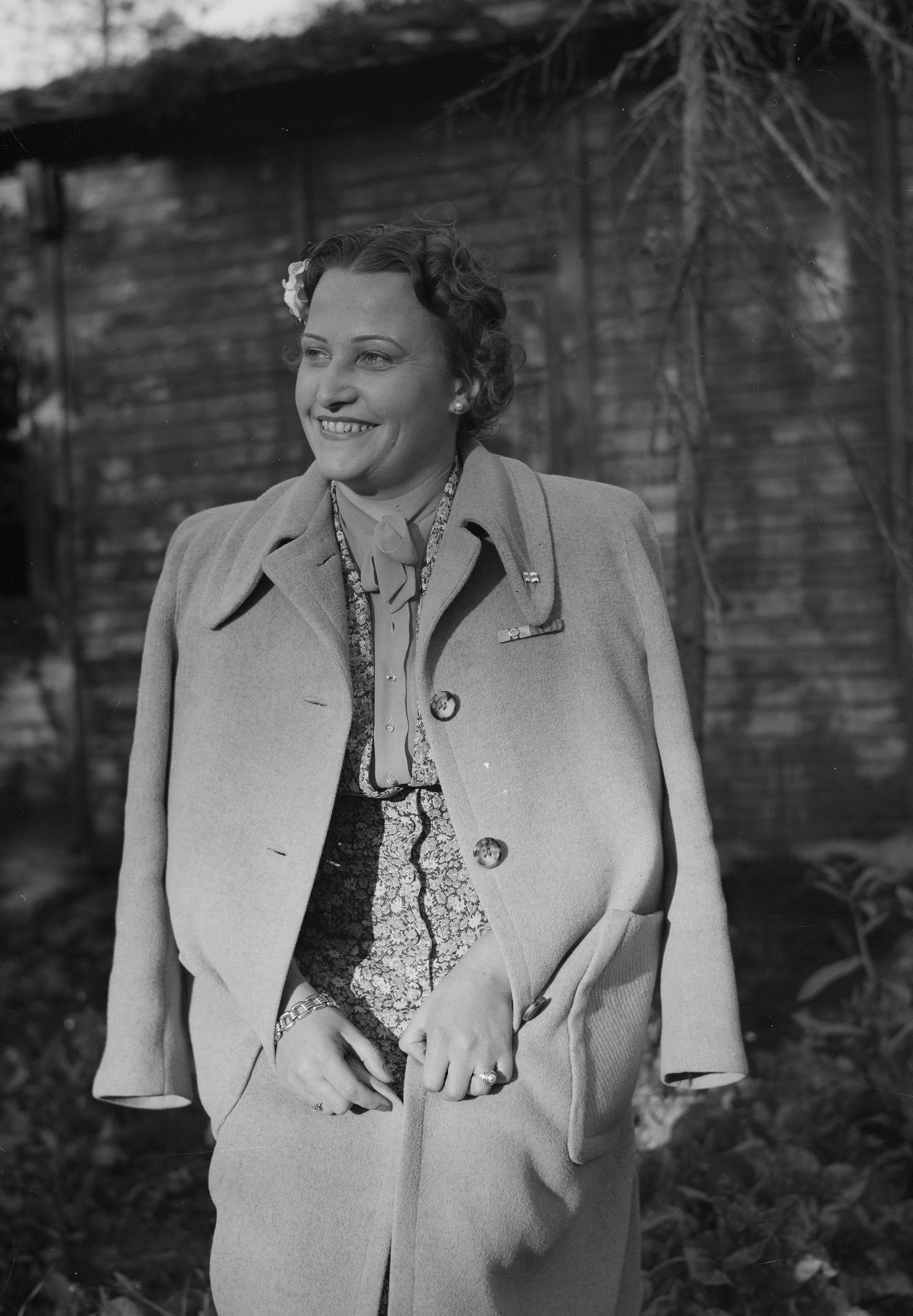
- Lea Piltti in 1943
- Born: Lea Maire Piltti; 1 February 1904; Rautjärvi, Grand Duchy of Finland
- Died: 5 February 1982 (aged 78); Helsinki, Finland
- Awards: Pro Finlandia (1956)

Lea Piltti (1 February 1904 – 5 February 1982) was a Finnish opera singer and voice pedagog, one of the leading coloratura sopranos of the 1930s and 40s, and one of Finland's most successful singers on the international stage.

== Early life and education ==
Lea Piltti was born to Juho Piltti and Elsa Maria née Korhonen; both her parents were teachers. Her father was a keen singer, and singing helped form a strong connection between him and his daughter.

After completing her secondary education, she went to the Jyväskylä teacher training college to train also as a teacher; she completed her training, but never worked as a teacher, choosing instead a musical career. Alongside her studies she took singing lessons from the age of 16, most notably under Anna Hagelstam at the Helsinki Music Institute (later Sibelius Academy, now part of the University of the Arts Helsinki).

She later continued her training on numerous study trips mainly to Paris, where she was tutored by Gabrielle Ritter-Ciampi, and to Berlin, working with Olga Eisner and Hertha Dehmlow throughout the late 1920s.

== Career ==
Piltti made her operatic debut at the Finnish Opera (now the Finnish National Opera and Ballet) in Helsinki, in the title role of Lakmé, in September 1927. She returned there a few more times in the 1940s and 1950s.

For much of her active singing career, however, Piltti worked in Germany, where she was nicknamed Die Piltti. She was attached to opera houses in Königsberg, Danzig, and Darmstadt, followed by several years as the first coloratura soprano at the Deutsches Nationaltheater Weimar (1934–1938) and finally at Vienna State Opera (1938–1943), before returning to Finland. She also made many guest appearances in opera houses and concerts in Berlin, Helsinki, Amsterdam, Budapest, and Salzburg, among others, as well as in the USA.

Her signature piece was the Queen of the Night aria from Mozart's Magic Flute'. In 1936, during a guest appearance at the Berlin State Opera to sing this role, she sang the aria in a much faster tempo than the conductor Leo Blech would have wanted, and Blech at first stopped conducting in protest at the singer's insolence, but by the time the piece was finished, he along with the audience was shouting out for an encore.

In 1939, Richard Strauss personally invited Piltti to sing the challenging Zerbinetta aria from Ariadne auf Naxos at his 75th anniversary concert.

Piltti recorded extensively, mostly collections of arias, but also at least one complete opera recording, namely Mozart's Die Entführung aus dem Serail (1936). She also had a singing role in the German 1942 film Wiener Blut (Vienna Blood), directed by Willi Forst.

Upon her return to Finland in 1943, Piltti initially received a cool reception due to her association with Nazi Germany, and it took many years for her talents to be appreciated again in her native country.

Her singing career was effectively over, but later on, Piltti taught voice for over 20 years, in music institutes and conservatoires in Lahti, Jyväskylä, and Turku, as well as privately. Some of her more notable students included soprano Anita Välkki, bass Matti Salminen, and tenor Seppo Ruohonen.

During her career, Piltti performed in c. 50 roles, as well as over 2,000 concerts.

She retired in 1961.

== Awards and honours ==
In 1956, Piltti received the Pro Finlandia medal of the Order of the Lion of Finland.

In 1974, the honorary title of Professori was conferred on Piltti.

== Lea Piltti Prize ==
The Finnish Cultural Foundation occasionally awards the Lea Piltti Prize, based on Piltti's 1979 endowment, to distinguished opera singers; recipients include Kim Borg, Anita Välkki, Jorma Hynninen and Matti Salminen.

== Personal life ==
Piltti was an extremely shy and reserved person.

She was married twice. During her time in Germany she was married to a German man, as well as taking German citizenship. The marriage ended in 1943, and Piltti returned to Finland, where, in 1946, she married Olavi Killinen.
