= Piano Trio in D major (Sibelius) =

Piano trio by Jean Sibelius (1886)

- Korpo
- by Jean Sibelius
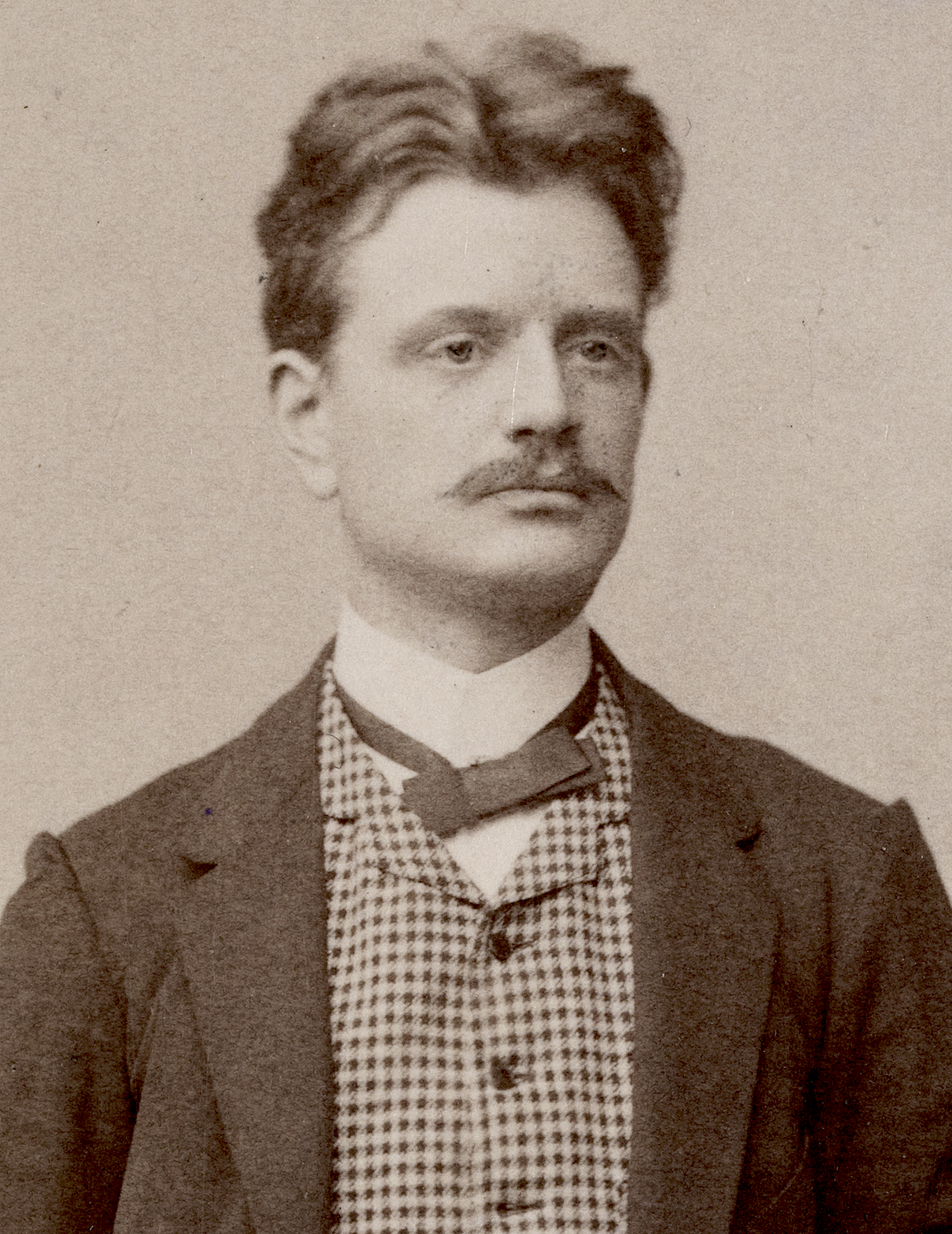
- The composer (c. 1885–1888)
- Catalogue: JS 209
- Composed: 1887
- Duration: 34 mins.
- Movements: 3

The Piano Trio in D major, Korpo, JS 209, is a three-movement chamber piece for violin, cello, and piano written in the summer of 1887 by the Finnish composer Jean Sibelius. The trio derives its nickname from Korpo (Finnish: Korppoo), an island located in the Turku archipelago, at which the Sibelius family vacationed in 1887. It is Sibelius's third, and most significant, piano trio.

== Structure ==
The D major trio is in three movements, as follows:

1. Allegro moderato
2. Fantasia. Andante – Andantino –
3. Finale. Vivace

The Korpo Trio remains in manuscript.

== Discography ==
The Finnish musicians Jaakko Kuusisto (violin), Marko Yltinen (cello), and Folke Gräsbeck (piano) made the world premiere studio recording of the Korpo Trio in 2002 for BIS. The table below lists this and other commercially available recordings:

No.	Violin	Cello	Piano	Runtime (Note: All runtimes are official, as printed on CD or LP liner notes.)	Rec. (Note: Refers to the year in which the performers recorded the work; this may not be the same as the year in which the recording was first released to the general public.)	Recording venue	Label	Ref.
1	Jaakko Kuusisto	Marko Yltinen	Folke Gräsbeck	35:51	2002	Danderyds gymnasium	BIS	(Note: Kuusisto, Yltinen, Gräsbeck–BIS (CD–1292) 2004)
2	Petteri Iivonen	Samuli Peltonen	Juho Pohjonen	26:22	2016	Segerstrom Center for the Arts	Yarlung	(Note: Sibelius Piano Trio–Yarlung (YAR54763) 2016)

== Notes, references, and sources ==
Notes

Sources

- Barnett, Andrew (2007). Sibelius. New Haven: Yale University Press. ISBN 978-0-300-11159-0.
- Dahlström, Fabian [in Swedish] (2003). Jean Sibelius: Thematisch-bibliographisches Verzeichnis seiner Werke [Jean Sibelius: A Thematic Bibliographic Index of His Works] (in German). Wiesbaden: Breitkopf & Härtel. ISBN 3-7651-0333-0.
