= Piano Trio in C major (Sibelius) =

Piano trio by Jean Sibelius (1886)

- Lovisa
- by Jean Sibelius
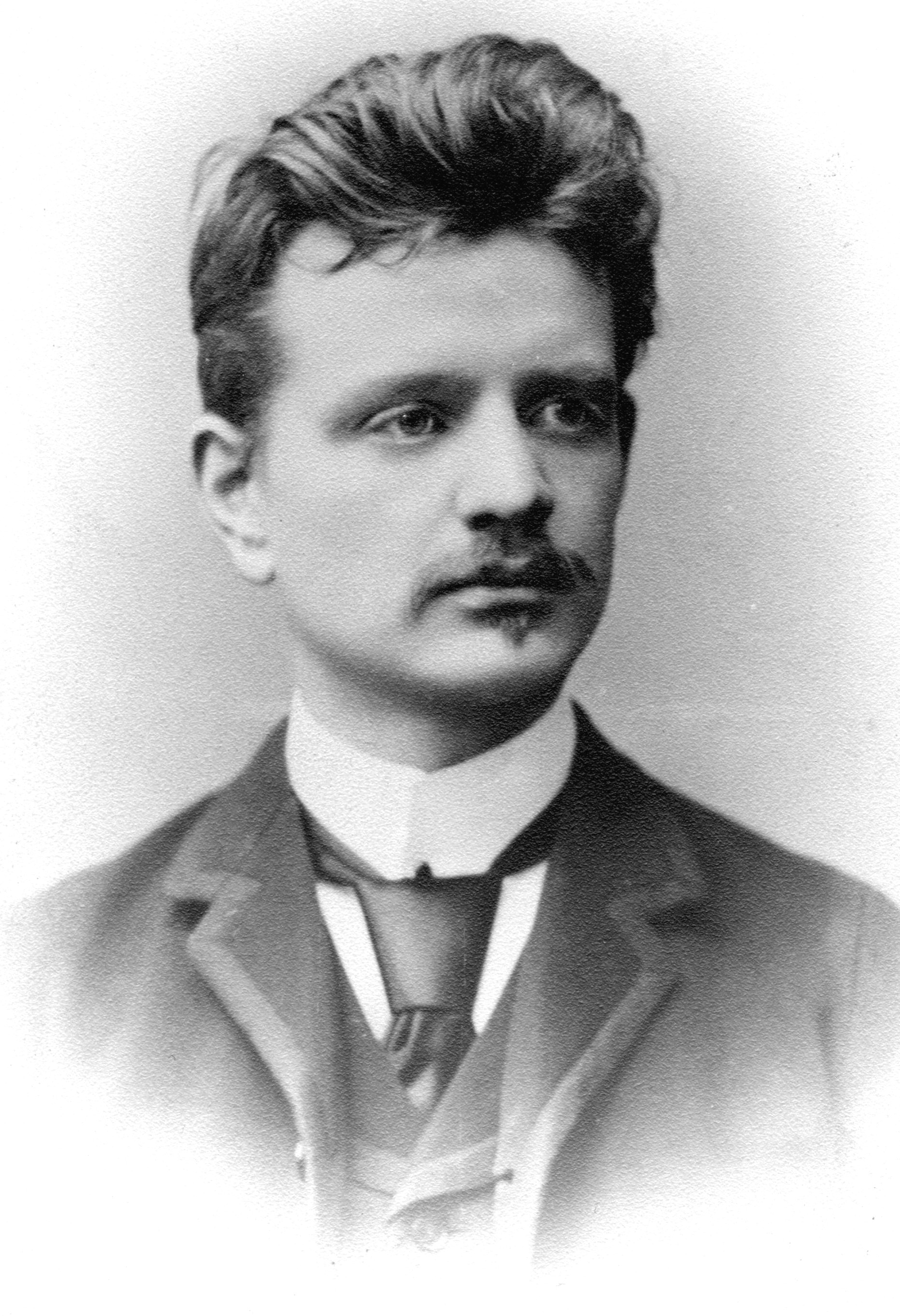
- The composer in 1889
- Catalogue: JS 208
- Composed: 1888
- Publisher: Fazer (1991)
- Duration: 16 mins.
- Movements: 3

The Piano Trio in C major, Lovisa, JS 208, is a three-movement chamber piece for violin, cello, and piano written in the summer of 1888 by the Finnish composer Jean Sibelius. The trio derives its nickname from Lovisa (in Finnish: Loviisa), the municipality in which the composer's aunt (and, before her death, his paternal grandmother) lived; Sibelius summered there in 1888.

== Structure ==
The C major trio is in three movements, as follows:

1. Allegro
2. Andante
3. Lento – Allegro con brio

The Lovisa Trio was published posthumously in 1991 by Fazer Music.

== Discography ==
The Finnish musicians Jaakko Ilves (violin), Risto Poutanen (cello), and Ilmo Ranta (piano)—the Tapiola Trio—made the world premiere studio recording of the Lovisa Trio in 1988 for Finlandia. The table below lists this and other commercially available recordings:

No.	Violin	Cello	Piano	Runtime (Note: All runtimes are official, as printed on CD or LP liner notes.)	Rec. (Note: Refers to the year in which the performers recorded the work; this may not be the same as the year in which the recording was first released to the general public.)	Recording venue	Label	Ref.
1	Jaakko Ilves	Risto Poutanen	Ilmo Ranta	16:00	1988	Roihuvuoren kirkko	Finlandia	(Note: Tapiola Trio–Finlandia (FACD 375) 1989)
2	Yoshiko Arai	Seppo Kimanen	Juhani Lagerspetz	15:40	1995	Järvenpää Hall	Ondine	(Note: Arai, Kimanen, Lagerspetz–Ondine (ODE 850–2) 1995)
3	Janne Tateno	Erkki Rautio	Izumi Tateno	16:44	1995	Ainola	Canyon Classics	(Note: Tateno, Ratio, Tateno–Canyon Classics (PCCL–00328) 1996)
4	Jaakko Kuusisto	Marko Yltinen	Folke Gräsbeck	15:47	2002	Danderyds gymnasium	BIS	(Note: Kuusisto, Yltinen, Gräsbeck–BIS (CD–1292) 2004)
5	Petteri Iivonen	Samuli Peltonen	Juho Pohjonen	13:21	2016	Segerstrom Center for the Arts	Yarlung	(Note: Sibelius Piano Trio–Yarlung (YAR54763) 2016)

== Notes, references, and sources ==
Notes

Sources

- Barnett, Andrew (2007). Sibelius. New Haven: Yale University Press. ISBN 978-0-300-11159-0.
- Dahlström, Fabian [in Swedish] (2003). Jean Sibelius: Thematisch-bibliographisches Verzeichnis seiner Werke [Jean Sibelius: A Thematic Bibliographic Index of His Works] (in German). Wiesbaden: Breitkopf & Härtel. ISBN 3-7651-0333-0.
