= Kosti Vehanen =

Finnish pianist and composer

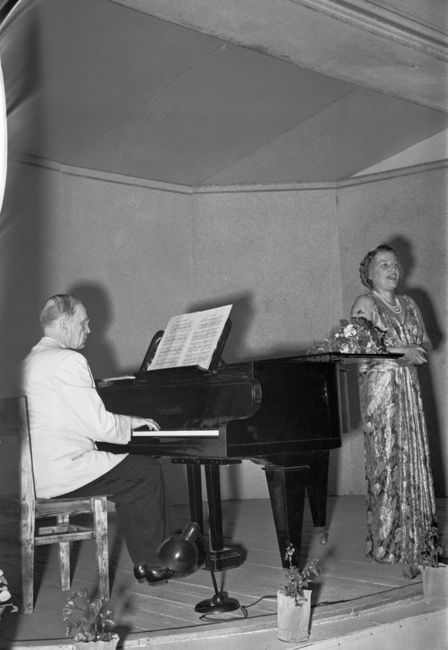
Vehanen accompanying singer Lea Piltti at a concert in the eastern Karelian isthmus in 1943

Kosti Vehanen (31 August 1887 – 13 March 1957) was a Finnish pianist and composer. As a pianist he performed in more than 3,000 concerts on four continents. While he did perform as a concert soloist with major symphony orchestras and performed in recitals, he is best remembered for his prolific work as an accompanist with some of the most important singers of the first half of the 20th century. As a composer, he produced piano pieces, arrangements of folk songs, solo songs, two ballets, and a violin and cello fantasy. In addition, Vehanen also penned several memoirs, including 1941 book chronicling his decade long experience serving as Marian Anderson's accompanist.

== Life and career ==
Born in Taivassalo, Vehanen entered the Helsinki Music Institute in 1905. He studied at the institute through 1910 where he was a pupil of Sigrid Schnéevoigt. He then pursued further studies in Berlin and Paris, and with Giovanni Sgambati in Rome.

In 1912 Vehanen gave his first performances as a concert pianist in Turku and Helsinki. He was soon after engaged as a soloist with major symphony orchestras through Scandinavia and in Great Britain. He became a popular accompanist who was sought after by many famous singers due to his sensitive and skilful playing. He enjoyed particularly fruitful partnerships with Marian Anderson, Aino Ackté, Maike Järnefelt, Antti Aune, Helge Lindberg and Titta Ruffo. He also performed regularly with soprano Maria Signe Liljequist (1876–1958), to whom he was married from 1924 to 1929. He accompanied Marian Anderson in her famous performance at the Lincoln Memorial on 9 April 1939, after she had been prohibited from performing at Constitution Hall.

Vehanen died in Turku in 1957 at the age of 69.

== Works ==
- Mestarilaulaja Helge Lindberg, Kirja 1929
- Marian Anderson: A Portrait, WSOY 1941
- Rapsodia elämästä, WSOY 1944
- Muistojen mosaiikkia, WSOY 1944
- Markiisitar ja muita muistelmia, Kanervan Kustannusliike 1949
