= Aino (Kajanus) =

Symphonic poem by Robert Kajanus

- Symphonic poem by Robert Kajanus
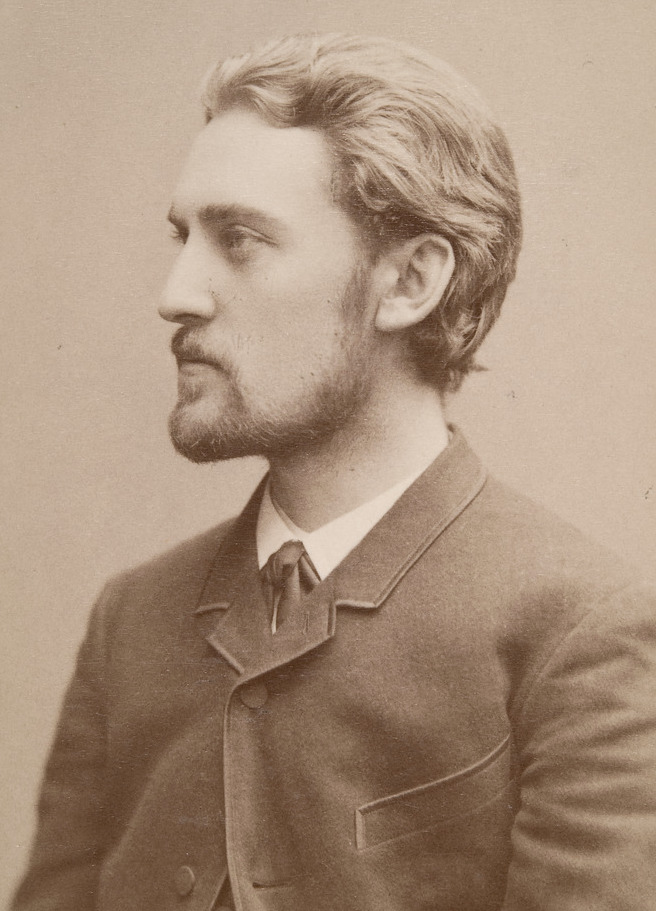
- The young composer (c. 1880s)
- Text: Soi, kannel, soi!
- Language: Finnish
- Composed: 1885; rev. 1916
- Duration: Approx. 14 minutes

Premiere
- Date: 28 February 1885
- Location: Helsinki, Grand Duchy of Finland
- Conductor: Robert Kajanus
- Performers: Helsinki Orchestral Society

Aino (sometimes referred to as the Aino Symphony) is a single-movement symphonic poem for male choir and orchestra written in 1885 by the Finnish conductor and composer Robert Kajanus. The piece tells the tragic story of the eponymous heroine from the Kalevala, although the Finnish-language text—Ring, Kantele, Ring! (Soi, kannel, soi!)—sung by the male choir at the end of the symphonic poem is not from the literary epic but rather is by an anonymous author. Aino premiered on 28 February 1885 at a concert celebrating the fiftieth anniversary of the Kalevala.

Kajanus's Aino also retains a degree of historical significance as a catalyst for Jean Sibelius: after hearing the symphonic poem in 1890, he was inspired to attempt his own Kalevala-themed composition, a process that would result two years later in the symphonic work Kullervo (Op. 7; 1892).

== History ==
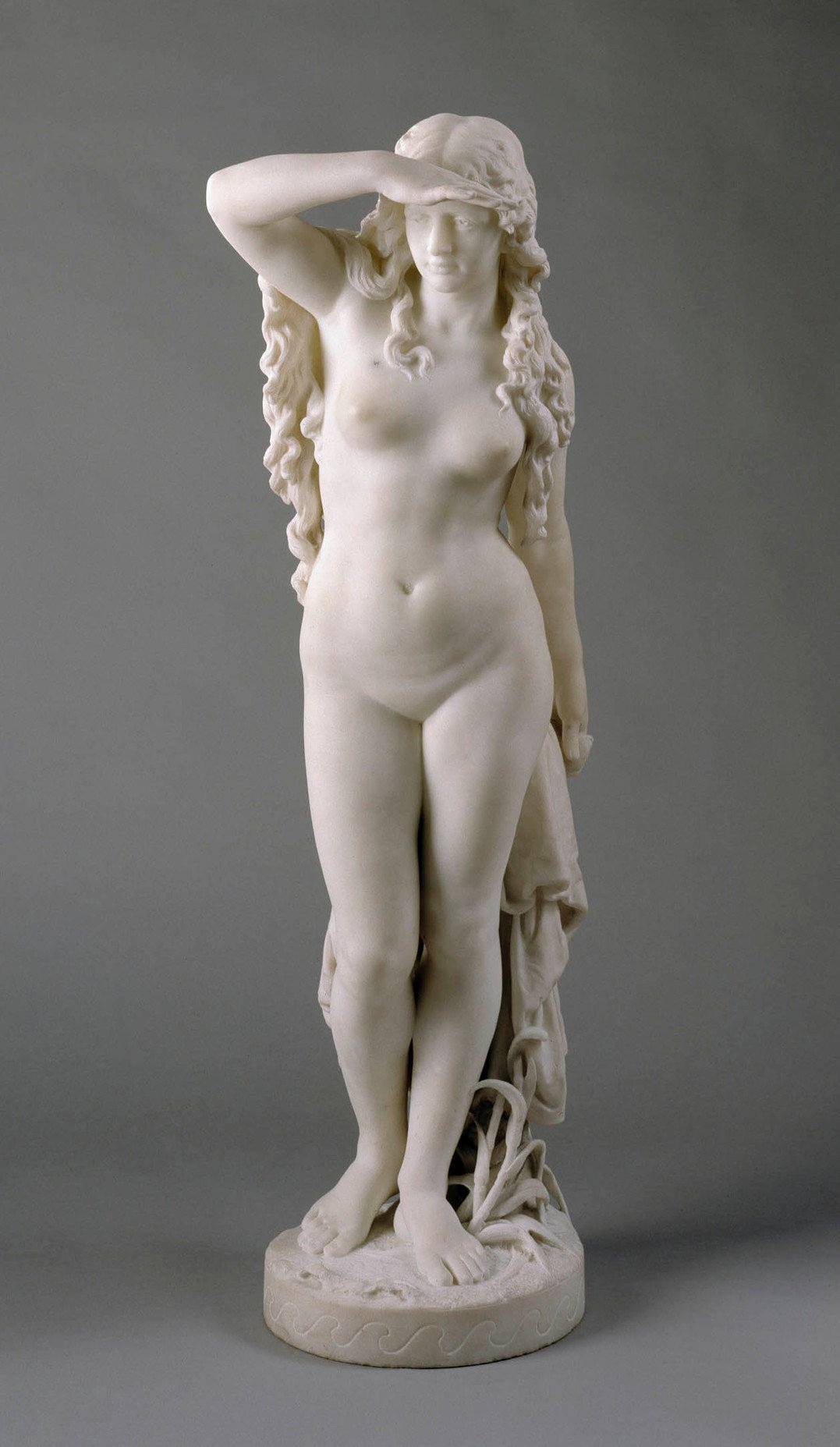
The 1886 statue Aino, by the Finnish sculptor Johannes Takanen

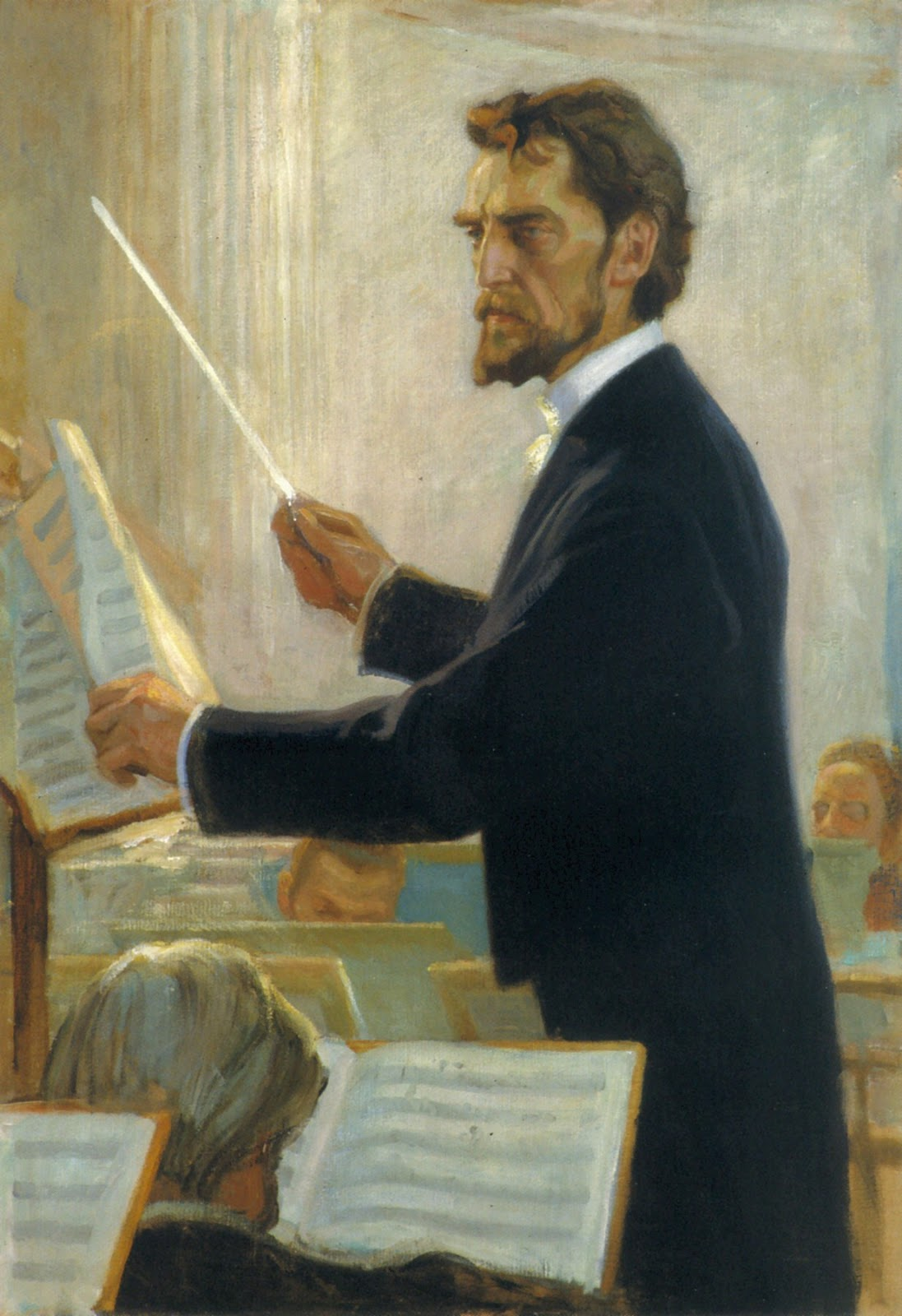
A 1905 painting of Kajanus conducting, by the Finnish painter Albert Edelfelt.

The Kalevala is a collection of folk poetry compiled by Elias Lönnrot in 1835 (the Old Kalevala) and expanded in 1849. Aino's story occurs in Runos III–V within the First Väinämöinen Cycle. Aino's brother, Joukahainen, challenges Väinämöinen to a battle of songs, knowledge, and blades. Annoyed, the old wizard uses his magic powers to sing Joukahainen into the earth up to his shoulders. To save himself, Joukahainen offers Väinämöinen his sister's hand in marriage, and joyfully the wizard reverses his spell. Rather than submit to this fate, a weeping Aino drowns herself and becomes a water spirit. Unbeknownst to Väinämöinen, she returns as a fish and allows him to hook her; as he attempts to filet his catch, she wriggles from his hands and reproves him for his stupidity. The grieving Väinämöinen again fishes the waters but he does not find Aino.

Not much is known about Kajanus's compositional process, including why he selected the above Kalevala tragedy as his topic. (Note: That is, using available English-language sources on Kajanus, as well as those on Sibelius.)

=== Notable performances ===
To commemorate the semicentennial of the Kalevala's first publication, the Finnish Literature Society—under the leadership of its chairman, the Finnish senator G. Z. Yrjö-Koskinen—organized a festival on 28 February 1885. The highlight was the premiere of a new Kalevala-themed composition by Finland's then-leading composer: Robert Kajanus's Aino, a symphonic poem (Swedish: symfonisk dikt; Finnish: sinfooninen runoelma) for male chorus and orchestra. Kajanus conducted the Helsinki Orchestral Society (which he had founded in 1882) and an unnamed (likely amateur) choir at the Ceremonial Hall of the Imperial Alexander's University of Finland. For Helsingfors Dagblad, the music critic Karl Wasenius (pen name 'Bis') wrote a favorable—if largely descriptive—review, complimenting the piece as "captivating and beautiful... gripping and elevated all the way to the final chord". (Note: Original Swedish: "fängslande och sköna... gripande och upphöjd ända till slutaccordet".) At the concert, Kajanus also conducted Kullervo's Funeral March (Kullervon surumarssi), his 1880 setting of Kullervo's demise in Runo XXXVI, as well as his Finnish Rhapsody in D minor (1881).

Lyrics to Aino

Chorus
Ring out, ring out, kantele, my sorrow is breaking me.
Ring out, ring out, it revives my heart.
Ring out tenderly and reverberate bitterly,
Thus my breast can find consolation.
Ring out, ring out now, kantele!
Ring out, it revives my heart.
Ring out, ring out, kantele.

— Anonymous, Ring, Kantele, Ring!

A week later, Kajanus and the Orchestral Society repeated Aino—its second performance—on 7 March at Ceremonial Hall; the program also included Berlioz's Symphonie fantastique. On 12 November 1885, Kajanus conducted (likely, again, the Orchestral Society) his symphonic poem at the Student House; the occasion was a charity benefit for the family of the recently deceased Finnish sculptor Johannes Takanen. The choice of program was appropriate given that Takanen had died before completing his statue Aino, Looking Out to Sea (terra-cotta sketch, 1874; plaster, 1876; posthumously carved in marble, 1886), which was on display at the soirée.

In the autumn of 1889, Kajanus traveled on sabbatical to Imperial Germany for further instruction in conducting under the renowned German conductor Hans von Bülow. A milestone arrived when on 11 February 1890 he conducted the Berlin Philharmonic in a performance of Aino; the audience reportedly received the piece rapturously. Nevertheless, the German music critic Heinrich Ehrlich provided a caustic review in Berliner Tageblatt, which Nya Pressen republished (in Swedish) on 17 February. While conceding that Kajanus was talented and that the beginning of the symphonic poem had had a charming theme, Ehrlich dismissed the Finn as yet another Wagner imitator, the collective lot of which "cannot even achieve [the master's] coughing an spitting"; (Note: Original Swedish: "ännu icke ens kan uppnå R. Wagners hostandejoch spottande".) he concluded by warning Kajanus to find another path forward.

=== Influence on Sibelius ===
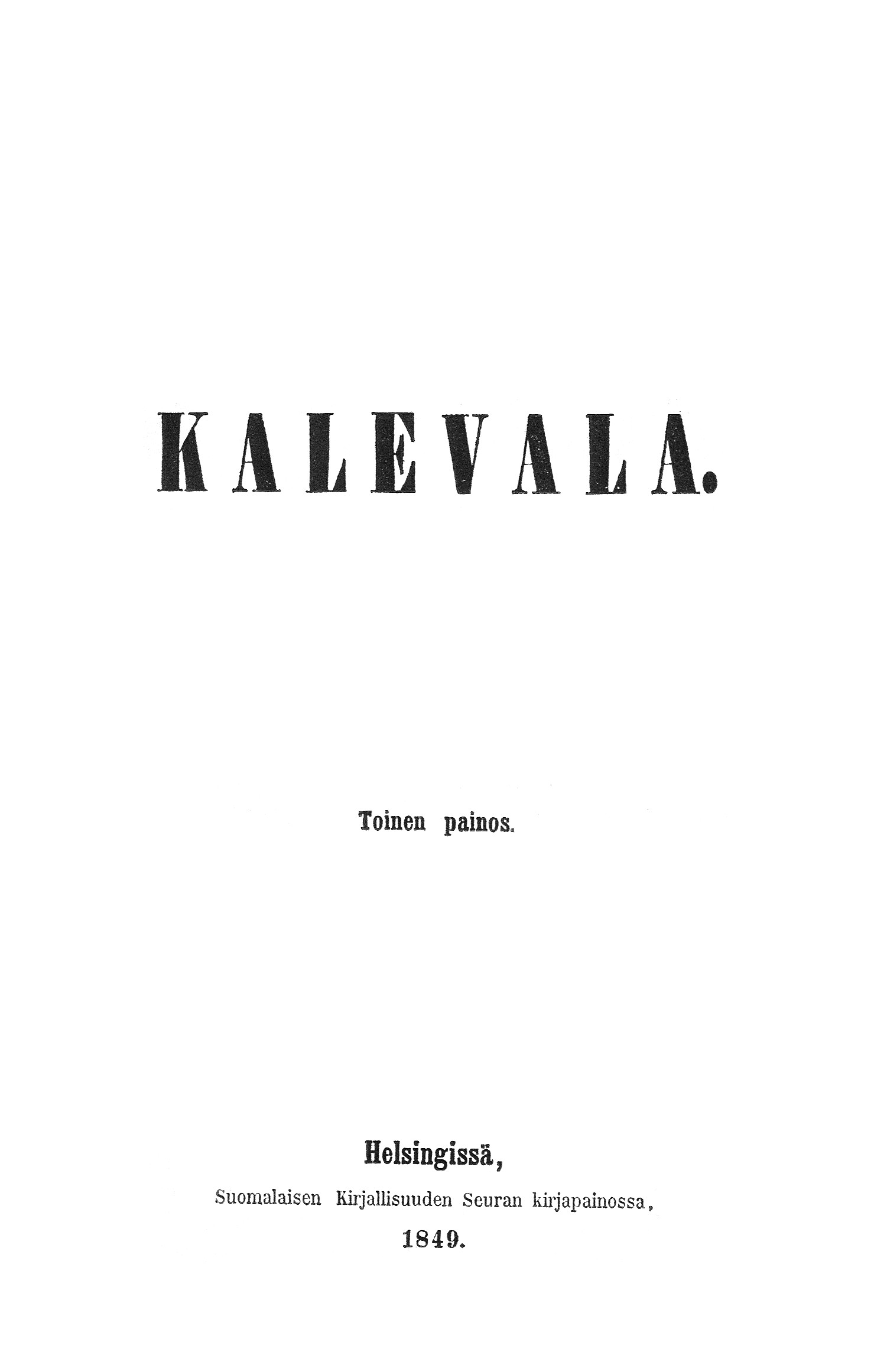
The title page to the 1849 2nd edition of the Kalevala, Finland's national epic

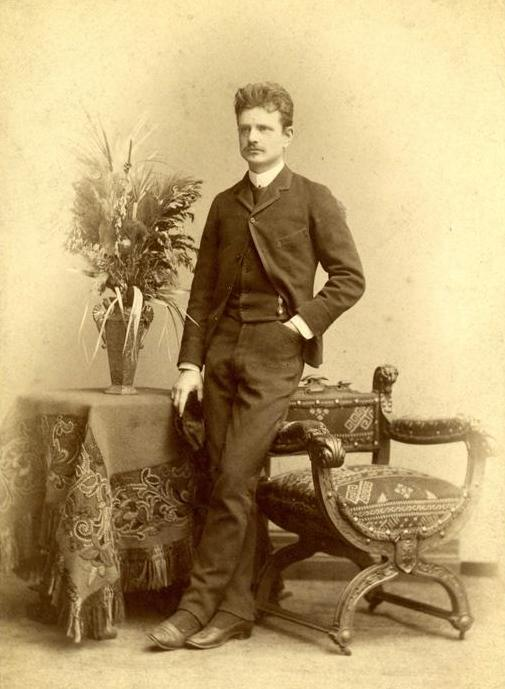
Kajanus's Aino may have inspired Jean Sibelius to create his own Kalevala-based work.

For the Berlin performance, Kajanus's junior compatriot, Jean Sibelius—who at the time was in Berlin studying counterpoint under Albert Becker—was in the audience. In the early 1930s, Sibelius told his biographer Karl Ekman that hearing Kajanus's Aino had been a formative experience in his own artistic development:

Acquaintance with this work was of thrilling importance to me. It opened my eyes to the wonderful opportunities the Kalevala offered for musical expression. Earlier attempts to interpret the national epos in music had not encouraged imitation ... After hearing Kajanus's Aino symphony the thought of creating a work myself with a subject chosen from our national epos began to occupy my fancy more and more.

— Jean Sibelius, as quoted in Ekman's 1935 biography Jean Sibelius: His Life and Personality

Two years later, Sibelius's interest in the Kalevala would result in Kullervo (Op. 7; 1892), the symphonic work for soloists, male chorus, and orchestra that launched Sibelius's career—and thus caused him to supplant Kajanus as Finland's most gifted composer (something Kajanus had prophesied—with a "compound of admiration mingled with an undertone of bitterness"—as early as 29 May 1889 upon hearing Sibelius's String Quartet in A minor, JS 183, at a student concert). Kullervo was the first in a celebrated series of Kalevala-inspired compositions by Sibelius, including: the Lemminkäinen Suite (Op. 22; 1893–96, r. 1897, 1900, 1939), The Origin of Fire (Op. 32; 1902, r. 1910), Pohjola's Daughter (Op. 49; 1906), Luonnotar (Op. 70; 1913), and Tapiola (Op. 112; 1926).

Kajanus's Aino therefore retains a degree of historical significance as a catalyst, although Antony Hodgson probably overstates matters in characterizing the Berlin concert as "[therefore] one of the most important and significant events in Finnish musical history". (Note: Hodgson incorrectly lists the date as 1889.) In the 1940s, Sibelius sought to downplay his comment to Ekman, telling a second biographer, Nils-Eric Ringbom, that he arrived at a Kalevala-inspired work independent of Kajanus's example: "That was something that matured in me quite by itself ... that was in the air". Indeed, as Glenda Dawn Goss has written, in the late nineteenth century, many members of the Finnish artistic community already believed that "a Finn's highest endeavor was cultural service", and many "undertook the study of folk poetry and music as a patriotic duty". In other words, Kajanus's example was just one part of "larger trends ... a profusion of dramatists, poets, artists, composers, folklorists, and professors who—seeking to invent a national character, much of it through high art—nourished an extraordinary efflorescence in music, literature, and the visual arts".

Moreover, Kajanus's Aino and Sibelius's Kullervo, despite superficial similarities such as the deployment of a unison male chorus, are stylistically dissimilar. Sibelius's biographer Erik Tawaststjerna, for example, has argued that the two pieces are "worlds apart in atmosphere and quality", as the Kajanus is "heavily endowed with Wagnerian chromaticism and ... overtones of Lohengrin", whereas the Sibelius draws upon "the mainstream European masters, the symphonies of Beethoven, Bruckner, Berlioz, and Liszt". Kimmo Korhonen concurs, noting that whereas Aino entails the "uneasy marriage of Central European Romanticism to Finnish topics", Kullervo marks the "emerge[nce of] a true national musical language". Ringbom also notes that Sibelius was "extremely critical" of Aino until Kajanus revised it in 1916, removing some of what Sibelius considered to be its Wagnerian excess.

== Recordings ==
In 1991, Jorma Panula and the Finnish Radio Symphony Orchestra made the world premiere recording of Kajanus's Aino. Writing in the American Record Guide, Kurt Moses noted the Wagnerian touches and characterized the symphonic poem as a "pleasant work, even stirring some of the time"; nevertheless, he thought that Kajanus had failed to adequately capture the subject matter of Aino's story. In 2001, Aino received its second recording, by Osmo Vänskä and the Lahti Symphony Orchestra. Charles Parsons, also of the American Record Guide, described the all-Kajanus disc as a "veritable orgy of German romanticism... with gleaming glowing tone and excitement". About Aino, he wrote that the choral conclusion "adds to the musical splendor".

The sortable table below lists all commercially available recordings of Aino:

| No. | Conductor | Orchestra | Male choir(s) | Rec. (Note: Refers to the year in which the performers recorded the work; this may not be the same as the year in which the recording was first released to the general public.) | Time | Recording venue | Label | Ref. |
|---|---|---|---|---|---|---|---|---|
| 1 | Jorma Panula | Finnish Radio Symphony Orchestra | YL Male Voice Choir (1) | 1990 | 14:33 | Kulttuuritalo | Ondine | (Note: J. Panula–Ondine (ODE 992–2) 2001) |
| 2 | Osmo Vänskä | Lahti Symphony Orchestra | YL Male Voice Choir (2) | 2001 | 14:26 | Sibelius Hall | BIS | (Note: O. Vänskä–BIS (CD–1223) 2004) |
| 3 | Leon Botstein | American Symphony Orchestra | Bard Festival Chorus | 2011^{L} | 14:19 | Sosnoff Theater | ASO (Note: This orchestra records under its in-house label.) | (Note: L. Botstein–ASO (ASO217) 2011) |

== Notes, references, and sources ==
=== Sources ===
Books

- Ekman, Karl [in Finnish] (1938) [1935]. Jean Sibelius: His Life and Personality. Translated by Birse, Edward. New York: Alfred A. Knopf. OCLC 896231.
- Hodgson, Antony (1984). Scandinavian Music. Cranbury, NJ: Associated University Presses. ISBN 9780838623466.
- Korhonen, Kimmo [in Finnish] (2007) [2003]. Inventing Finnish Music: Contemporary Composers from Medieval to Modern. Translated by Mäntyjärvi, Jaakko [in Finnish] (2nd ed.). Jyväskylä, Finland: Finnish Music Information Center (FIMIC) & Gummerus Kirjapaino Oy. ISBN 9789525076615.
- Liukkonen, Jaakko (2009). Johannes Takasen juhlavuosi 2009: 160 vuotta Johannes Takasen syntymästä [Johannes Takanen's Anniversary 2009: 160 Years since Johannes Takanen Was Born] (PDF) (in Finnish). Johannes Takanen Seura ry.
- Magoun, Jr., Francis Peabody, ed. (1963). The Kalevala: Or Poems of the Kaleva District. Cambridge, Massachusetts: Harvard University Press. ISBN 9780674500105.
- Ringbom, Nils-Eric [in Finnish] (1954) [1948]. Jean Sibelius: A Master and His Work. Translated by de Courcy, G. I. C. Norman, Oklahoma: University of Oklahoma. ISBN 9780837198408.
- Tawaststjerna, Erik (2008) [1965/1967; trans. 1976]. Sibelius: Volume I, 1865–1905. Translated by Layton, Robert. London: Faber and Faber. ISBN 9780571247721.

Liner notes

- Panula, Jorma (2001). Sibelius Favorites (booklet). Finnish Radio Symphony Orchestra. Ondine. ODE 992–2. OCLC 48800855
- Barnett, Andrew (2004). Robert Kajanus: Finnish Rhapsody; Kullervo's Funeral March; Sinfonietta; Aino (booklet). Osmo Vänskä & Lahti Symphony Orchestra. BIS. p. 3–8. CD–1223. OCLC 56051970

Journal articles

- Goss, Glenda Dawn (2003). "A Backdrop for Young Sibelius: The Intellectual Genesis of the Kullervo Symphony". 19th-Century Music. 27 (1). University of California Press: 48–73. doi:10.1525/ncm.2003.27.1.48. JSTOR 10.1525/ncm.2003.27.1.48. (subscription required)
- Moses, Kurt (2002). "Sibelius: En Saga; Pohjola's Daughter; Impromptu; Rakastava; Andante Festivo; Kajanus: Aino". American Record Guide. 65 (2). Record Guide Publications: 162. (subscription required)
- Parsons, Charles (2004). "Kajanus: Finnish Rhapsody 1; Kullervo's Funeral March; Sinfonietta; Aino". American Record Guide. 67 (6). Record Guide Publications: 117–18. (subscription required)

Newspaper articles (by date)

- "Finska litteratursällskapets fest" [Finnish Literature Society's celebration]. Finland (in Swedish). No. 48. 27 February 1885. p. 4.
- "Finska litteratursällskapets Kalevala-fest" [Finnish Literature Society's Kalevala celebration]. Åbo Tidning (in Swedish). No. 57. 28 February 1885. p. 2.
- Bis [Wasenius, Karl] [in Finnish] (28 February 1885). "Aino: Symfonisk dikt af Robert Kajanus" [Aino: Symphonic poem by Robert Kajanus]. Helsingfors Dagblad (in Swedish). No. 57. p. 3.
- "Orkesterföreningens 6;te sinfonikonsert" [The Orchestral Society's 6th symphony concert]. Finland (in Swedish). No. 58. 11 March 1885. p. 2.
- "Soirén till Johannes Takanens minne" [The evening in memory of Johannes Takanen]. Finlands Allmänna Tidning (in Swedish). No. 264. 13 November 1885. p. 1.
- "Literatur och konst. – Robert Kajanus" [Literature and concerts – Robert Kajanus]. Nya Pressen (in Swedish). No. 41. 12 February 1890. p. 3.
- Ehrlich, Heinrich (17 February 1890). "Hr Kajanus Ainosinfoni i Berlin" [Mr. Kajanus's Aino Symphony in Berlin]. Nya Pressen (in Swedish). No. 46. p. 2.
