= Scènes historiques I =

Concert suite by Jean Sibelius (1911)

- Concert suite by Jean Sibelius
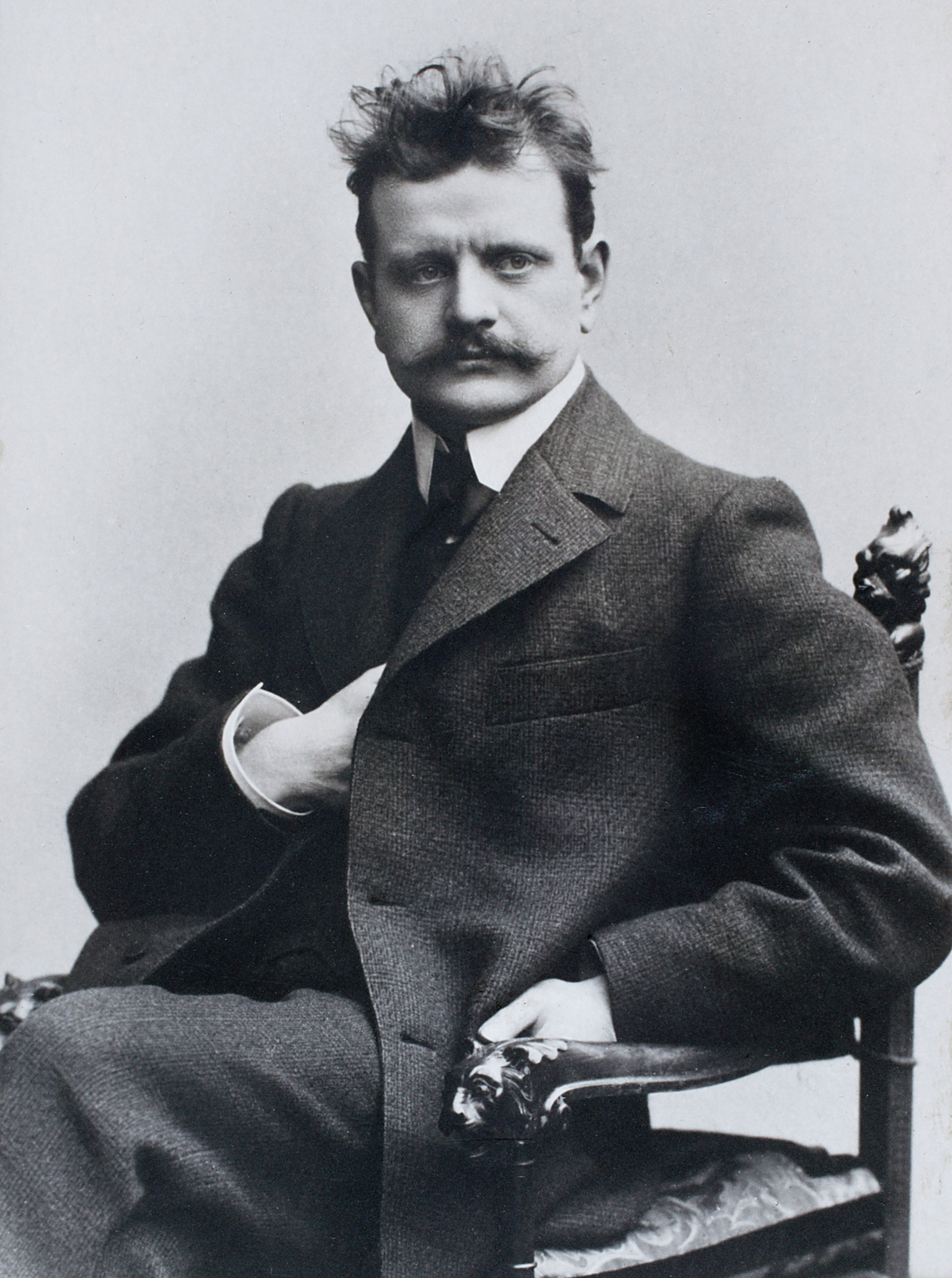
- The composer (c. 1898–1900)
- Opus: 25 (arr. from JS 137)
- Composed: 1899, arr. 1911
- Publisher: Breitkopf & Härtel (1912)
- Duration: 17.5 mins.
- Movements: 3

Premiere
- Date: 4 November 1899 (JS 137); 11 October 1912 (Op. 25)
- Location: Helsinki, Finland
- Conductor: Jean Sibelius
- Performers: Helsinki Philharmonic Society

The Scènes historiques I (literal English translation: Historical Scenes I), Op. 25, is a three-movement concert suite for orchestra written in 1911 by the Finnish composer Jean Sibelius, who excerpted and arranged tableaux Nos. 1, 4, and 3 from 1899's Music for the Press Celebrations Days (JS 137). The suite premiered on 11 October 1912 at the Finnish National Theatre in Helsinki, with Sibelius conducting the Helsinki Philharmonic Society.

== Structure ==
The Scènes historiques I contains three numbers, as follows:

1. All'Overtura. Grave — Allegro
2. Scena. Tempo di menuetto — Allegro moderato
3. Festivo. Tempo di Bolero

== Instrumentation ==
The first number of the Scènes historiques I, All'Overtura, is scored for the following instruments, organized by family (woodwinds, brass, percussion, and strings):

- 2 flutes, 2 oboes, 2 clarinets (in B♭), and 2 bassoons
- 4 horns (in F), 3 trumpets (in B♭), and 3 trombones
- Timpani
- Violins (I and II), violas, cellos, and double basses

Scena (No. 2) expands the percussion section to include bass drum, snare drum, cymbals, and triangle, while Festivo (No. 3) adds castanets; in addition, Scena calls for each flutist to double piccolo.

== Discography ==
The sortable table below contains commercially available recordings of the complete Scènes historiques I:

| No. | Conductor | Ensemble | Rec. (Note: Refers to the year in which the performers recorded the work; this may not be the same as the year in which the recording was first released to the general public.) | Time | Recording venue | Label | Ref. |
|---|---|---|---|---|---|---|---|
| 1 | Jussi Jalas | Hungarian State Symphony Orchestra | 1974 | 16:31 | Torockó Square Church, Budapest | Decca | (Note: J. Jalas—Decca (482 3311) 2015) |
| 2 | Paavo Berglund | Bournemouth Symphony Orchestra | 1975 | 16:24 | Southampton Guildhall | EMI Classics | (Note: P. Berglund–EMI Classics (50999 2 17674 2 5) 2008) |
| 3 | Sir Alexander Gibson | Scottish National Orchestra | 1977 | 18:48 | Motherwell Town Hall | Chandos | (Note: A. Gibson—Chandos (CHAN 8393) 1985) |
| 4 | Neeme Järvi | Gothenburg Symphony Orchestra | 1985 | 18:09 | Gothenburg Concert Hall | BIS | (Note: N. Järvi–BIS (CD–295) 1986) |
| 5 | Jukka-Pekka Saraste | Finnish Radio Symphony Orchestra | 1988 | 17:53 | Kulttuuritalo | RCA Red Seal | (Note: J. Saraste–RCA (19439704812) 2020) |
| 6 | Leif Segerstam | Danish National Symphony Orchestra | 1995 | 18:50 | Danish Radio Concert Hall | Chandos | (Note: L. Segerstam–Chandos (CHAN 9483) 1996) |
| 7 | Ari Rasilainen | Norwegian Radio Orchestra | 2001 | 16:40 | NRK Broadcasting Hall | Finlandia | (Note: A. Rasilainen–Finlandia (0927–41935–2) 2002) |
| 8 | Pietari Inkinen | New Zealand Symphony Orchestra | 2006 | 18:12 | Wellington Town Hall | Naxos | (Note: P. Sakari–Naxos (8.570068) 2008) |
| 9 | Douglas Bostock | Gothenburg-Aarhus Philharmonic | 2007 | 17:28 | Frichsparken, Aarhus | Classico | (Note: D. Bostok–Classico (CLASSCD 733) 2007) |

== Notes, references, and sources ==
Notes

Sources

- Barnett, Andrew (2007). Sibelius. New Haven: Yale University Press. ISBN 978-0-300-11159-0.
- Dahlström, Fabian [in Swedish] (2003). Jean Sibelius: Thematisch-bibliographisches Verzeichnis seiner Werke [Jean Sibelius: A Thematic Bibliographic Index of His Works] (in German). Wiesbaden: Breitkopf & Härtel. ISBN 3-7651-0333-0.
- Tawaststjerna, Erik (2008b) [1972; trans. 1986]. Sibelius: Volume II, 1904–1914. Translated by Layton, Robert. London: Faber and Faber. ISBN 978-0-571-24773-8.
