= Johan Cajan =

Juhana "Johan" Fredrik Cajan (13 September 1815 – 28 February 1887) was a Finnish clergyman and historian, the author of the first history of Finland written in Finnish.

Cajan was born in Sotkamo, Finland and died in Piippola, Finland.

Cajan's parents were Johann Cajan and Eva Elfving. After his exam he traveled to Lapland. During his studies, he got to know Elias Lönnrot, and he collected folklore with him. Cajan wrote about Finland's history (in the Finnish language) in the publication Mehiläinen 1839-40. He used writing names as J. F. Kainonen and J. F. Kajaani. His magnum opus is Suomen Historia, koetteeksi kerrottu lyhykäiset järjestyksessä. Cajan wrote the first non-fiction literature in Finnish.

In 1842 Cajan married Adolfina Augusta Tauler (died 1858).

Cajan eventually suffered from mental illness.
