= Ludwig Bussler =

German music critic and conductor (1838–1900)

- Born: 26 November 1838; Berlin, Province of Brandenburg
- Died: 18 January 1900 (aged 61); Berlin, Province of Brandenburg
- Occupations: music teacher, critic and conductor

Ludwig Bussler (26 November 1838 – 18 January 1900) was a German musical instructor, critic and conductor. He was born in Berlin. His father, Robert Bussler, was a painter, author and privy counsellor. He was a pupil of A.E. Grell, Siegfried Dehn (theory), and W.E. Wieprecht (instrumentation). He died in Berlin.

== Career ==
He was for a time a musical director at Memel, East Prussia (now known as Klaipėda, part of Lithuania). He then taught theory at the Ganz School of Music (later the Schwantzer Conservatory) 1865 - 1874. He was nominated professor at the Mohr Conservatory (1874 - 1877). And then resumed his post at the Schwantzer Conservatory for 1877-1879. From 1879, he taught theory at the Stern Conservatory, receiving the title of royal professor in 1898. In 1883 he was appointed music critic of the Berlin National Zeitung. He also wrote for other Berlin journals. He was also a conductor at various Berlin theatres.

== Publications ==
- Musikalische Elementarlehre. Berlin: 1867; 16th ed., 1926; Eng. trans., 1890;
- Praktische Harmonielehre in Aufgaben. Berlin: 1875; Eng. trans., 1896.
- Der Strenge Satz. Berlin: 1877;
- Harmonische Übungen am Klavier. Berlin: 1878; Eng. trans., 1890;
- Kontrapunkt und Fuge im freien Tonsatz. Berlin: 1878;
- Musikalische Formenlehre. Berlin: 1878; Eng. trans., 1883.;
- Praktische musikalische Kompositionslehre. 2 pts., Berlin: 1878-79);
- Elementarmelodik. Berlin: 1879.
- Geschichte der Musik. Berlin: 1882;
- Partiturstudium (Modulationslehre). Berlin: 1882.
- Lexikon der musikalischen Harmonien. Berlin: 1889.
