= Werner Cajanus =

Finnish forest scientist

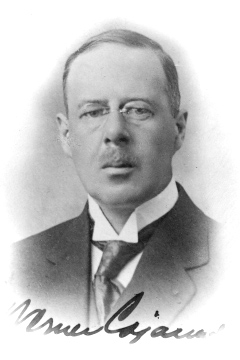
Werner Cajanus in 1910s.

Karl Werner Cajanus (1878–1919) was a Finnish forest scientist. He taught philosophy as a doctorate in 1914 and cared for at the University of Helsinki the evaluation of forest professions in 1909–1918. Thereafter, he was in 1918–1919 as Secretary of State in Stockholm and as Chargé d'Affaires in Copenhagen .
