= Helge Lindberg =

Finnish opera singer

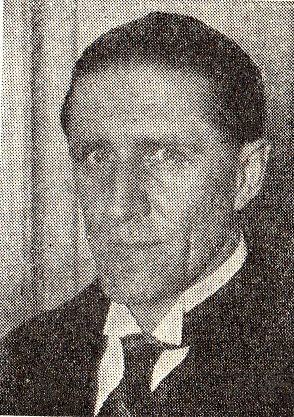
Helge Lindberg.

Helge Igor Lindberg (1887–1928) was a Finnish opera singer who was a popular concert singer in the 1920s throughout Europe. He was also a sculptor. Helge Lindberg first studied violin at the conservatory in Helsinki. In 1907, he studied voice in Munich and finished his studies in Florence. He was known for singing works by Johann Sebastian Bach, George Frideric Handel and Yrjö Kilpinen.

From Musica Fennica (1965) (Timo Makinin and Seppo Nummi, authors):

Helge Igor Lindberg, [a] baritone, spent a significant part of his life in Vienna. He was a great individualist both as a private person and as an artist, and his legendary career was to be both strange and extraordinary. Immediately on leaving school he left the country to study singing abroad. He first travelled to Munich and from there to Florence and Stuttgart. In 1919 he settled in Vienna and died there suddenly in 1928 after a serious illness. His best years were the last years of his life. Helge Lindberg was a powerful man, an athlete both in his looks and in his artistic demands. He was famous for his breathing technique. He liked to sing the arias of Bach and Handel and had mastered their long phrases, developing his own technique to an almost superhuman degree. He was also interested in his contemporary modernists, such as Schoenberg. Of Finnish composers his repertoire mostly included Kilpinen's songs. His fame as a singer was based on a technique that had been developed to perfection and on his minutely-studied performing style.

He received a medal from the King of Sweden for his singing. His known sculptures include a 12-inch wooden statue of himself as a satyr (1927); a sitting Buddha; a crucified Christ; and a black stone bust of his second wife (lost in Buenos Aires after her death).

He died of pneumonia in 1928 and his ashes are interred on a small island off the southern coast of Finland (San Scher), which he had bought as a summer retreat. He was survived by his first wife Ernestine (Erna); his second wife Friederike (Fritzi), a member of the novelty group the Seven Viennese Singing Sisters (see Wikipedia link); and his sons Kim, Lars, and Dian.

A biography was written on his life by Kosti Vehanen: Vehanen, Kosti: Mestarilaulaja Helge Lindberg. Kustannusyhtiö Kirja, Helsinki 1929.

Known recordings include: "Frohsinn und Schwermut" (Händel), "Wie glänzt der helle Mond" (Wolf) and "Der Wanderer" (Schubert) and "Froh lacht die Brust" (see link to song below). Six recordings have been digitized and placed online by the Music Library of the National Library of Finland and can be found in Raita, a collection of digitized early Finnish sound recordings, by searching this site with "Helge Lindberg".
