= Albert Becker (composer) =

German composer and conductor (1834–1899)

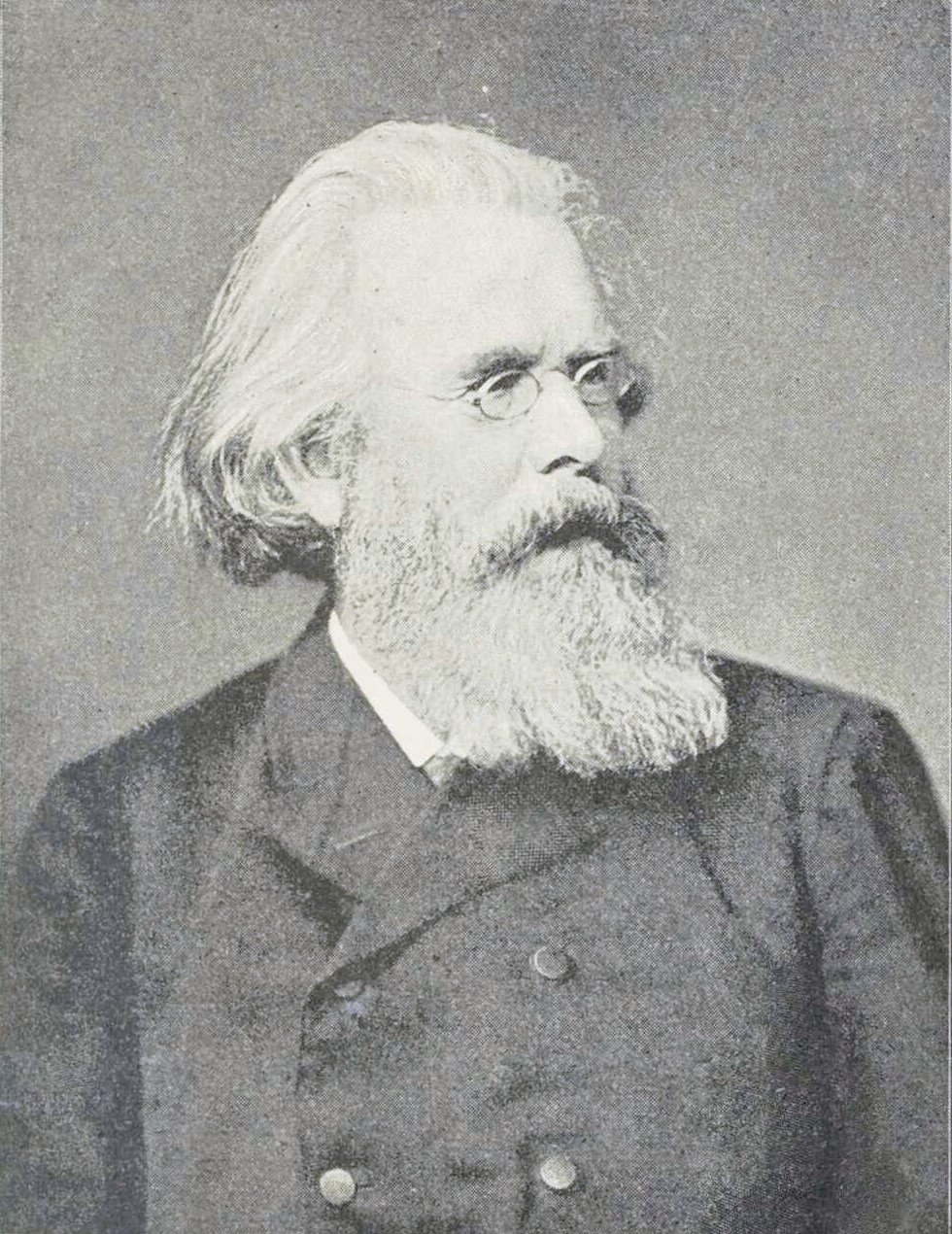
Albert Becker in 1890

Albert Ernst Anton Becker (13 June 1834 – 10 January 1899) was a German composer and conductor of the Romantic period.

Becker was born in Quedlinburg. In 1853–1856 he studied music composition under Siegfried Dehn in Berlin. He taught on the faculty of the Akademie der Künste where his famous pupils included Johan Halvorsen and Jean Sibelius. In 1889 he was appointed conductor of the Royal cathedral choir in Berlin. He was the grandfather of composer Günter Raphael. He died in Berlin.
