= Anna Hagelstam =

Finnish opera singer

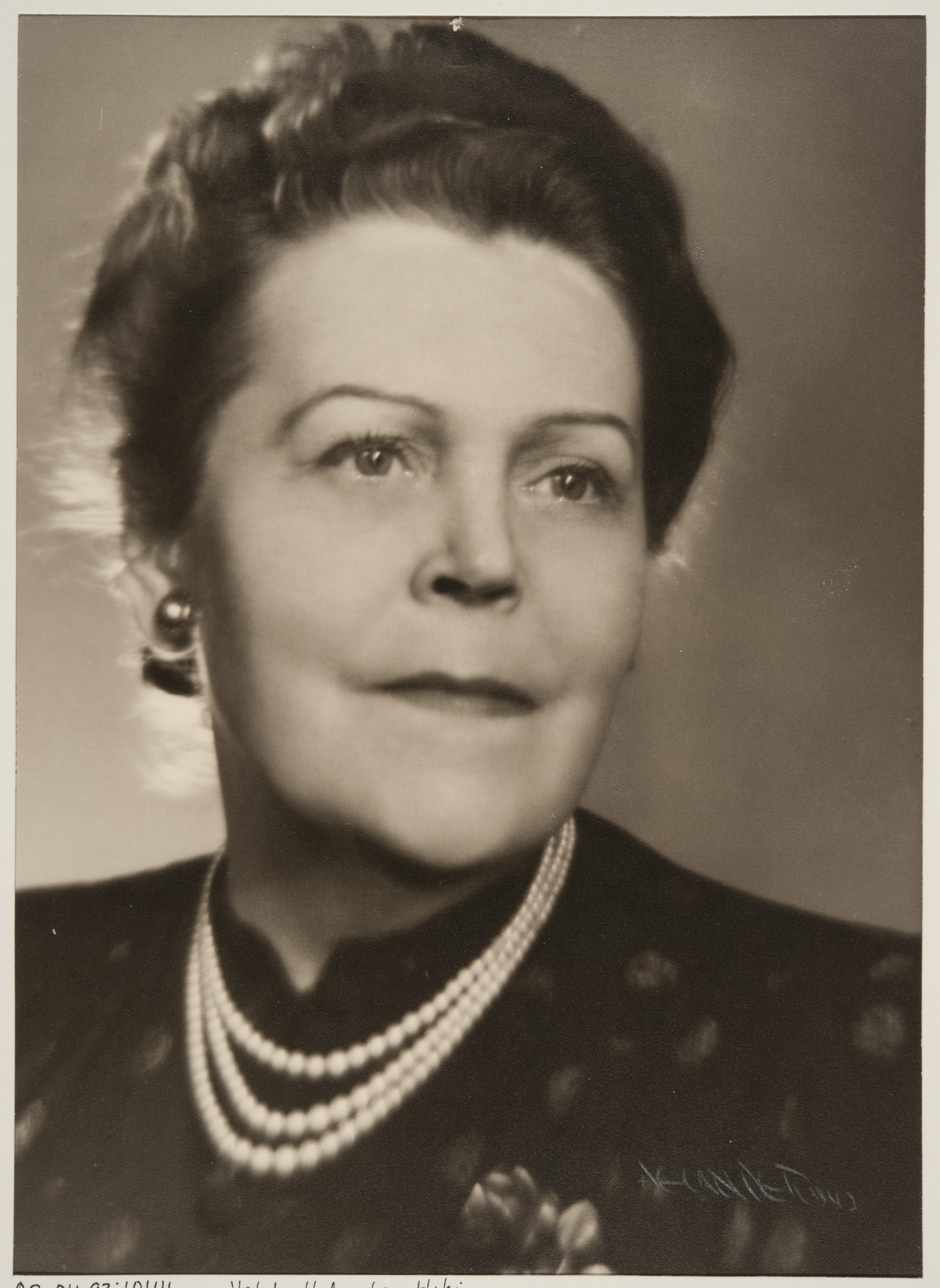
Anna Hagelstam in 1943.

Anna Emilia Hagelstam (born Silfverberg, 20 November 1883 in Turku-2 May 1946 in Helsinki) was a Finnish singer (mezzosopraano) and songwriter. She held her first concert in Helsinki in 1911. In particular, she introduced French songwriting and Sibelius, whose songs she performed with.

She was married to writer Wentzel Hagelstam.
