= Martin Wegelius =

Finnish composer (1846–1906)

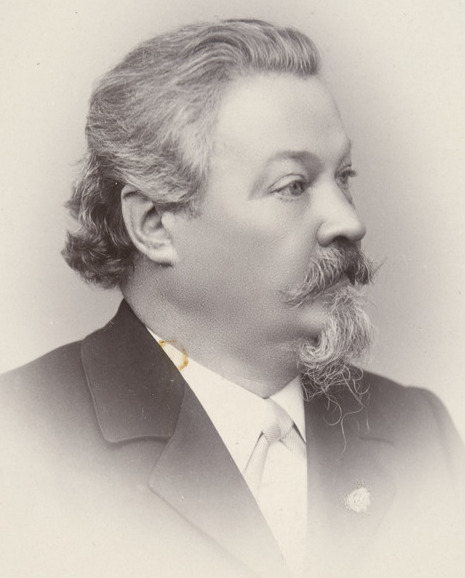
Wegelius (c. 1890s)

Martin Wegelius (10 November 1846 – 22 March 1906) was a Finnish composer and musicologist, primarily remembered as the founder, in 1882, of the Helsinki Music Institute, now known as the Sibelius Academy.

Wegelius studied in Leipzig, Vienna, and Munich. He had intended to pursue a career as a composer and wrote a handful of orchestral works and a significant number of chamber and vocal works. He was a particular admirer of Wagner but wrote predominantly in the Romantic style. After founding the Institute, he had little time for composing and appears to have concentrated exclusively on teaching. Graduates of Wegelius' Institute include Jean Sibelius and Agnes Tschetschulin.

He is often compared with his contemporary and rival Robert Kajanus, founder of the Helsinki Philharmonic Orchestra (initially the Helsinki Orchestral Association), the first professional symphony orchestra in the Nordic countries.

He is buried in the Hietaniemi Cemetery in Helsinki.

== Publications ==
- Grunderna i allmänna musikläran (1887)
- Lärobok i allmän musiklära och analys (1888-89)
- Hufvuddragen af den västerländska musikens historia från den kristna tidens början till våra dagar. 1-3 (1891-93)
- Kurs i tonträffning (1893)
- Kurs i honiofon sats (harmonilära). 1-2 (1897, 1905)
- Sångkurs för folkskolor (1897)
- Lauluoppijakso kansakouluja varten. 1. Oppikirja. Skaaloja, kaavoja ja harjoituksia kahdeksassatoista sävellajissa (1897)
- Toukokuun 6 :es päivä (1900)
- Konstnärsbrev. 1-2 (1919, 24)
