= Petteri Iivonen =

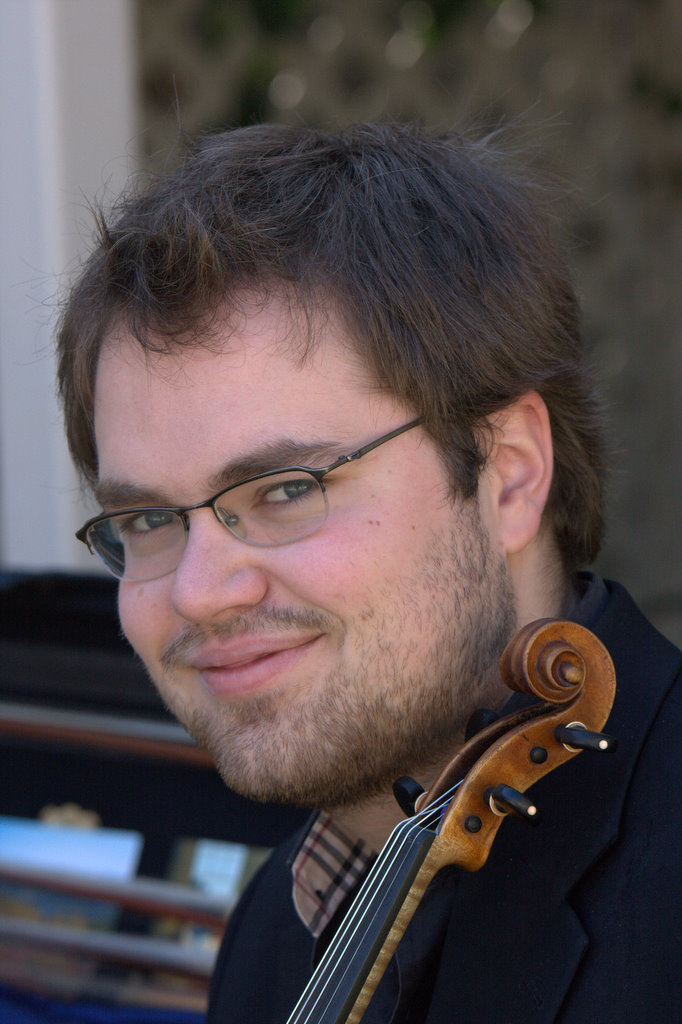
- Petteri Iivonen in 2009

Background information
- Born: 14 August 1987 (age 38); Helsinki, Finland
- Genres: classical
- Occupation: violinist
- Website: www.petteriiivonen.com

Petteri Iivonen (born 14 August 1987) is a Finnish violinist. He has studied at the Sibelius Academy, University of Southern California and the Tel Aviv University with Hagai Shaham. In 2005 he won the National Violin Competition in Kuopio, Finland and in 2010 he got 2nd Prize in the International Jean Sibelius Violin Competition.

Iivonen's debut album called Art of the Violin was released by Yarlung Records in 2009, followed by Art of the Sonata in 2011, both with pianist Kevin Fitz-Gerald, and a recording as a member of the Sibelius Piano Trio in 2016. In 2010 his Israeli debut took place at the Mann Auditorium in Tel Aviv with maestro Zubin Mehta.

Mr. Iivonen plays a Carlo Bergonzi (Villa Gyllenberg) violin made in the year 1732. The violin has previously been owned by Isaac Stern and Paavo Berglund. His special hobby is aerobatics flying with glider plane.
