= Samuli Peltonen =

Finnish cellist

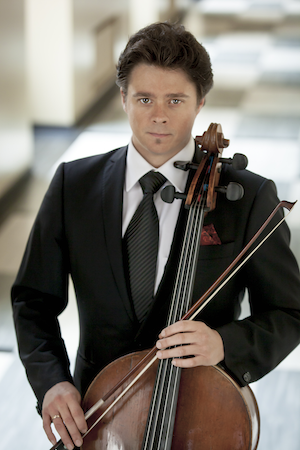
- Born: 21 June 1981 (age 44); Seinäjoki
- Occupation: Cellist

Samuli Peltonen (born 1981) is a Finnish cellist.

== Education ==
Samuli Peltonen started his cello studies with his father Jussi Peltonen in Seinäjoki. He continued with Timo Hanhinen in Turku (1998–2002) and with Arto Noras in Sibelius Academy, Helsinki.

== Work ==
Currently he plays Principal cello at the Finnish National Opera, and is frequently invited to play as guest principal at the Copenhagen Opera and Opera Australia.

He has made radio recordings for Finnish Broadcasting Company YLE. A Recording of Cheremissian Fantasy for cello and orchestra with Helsinki Philharmonic Orchestra (Ondine) was released in 2010.

Samuli recorded for Yarling records company with his Sibelius Piano trio in 2016.

== Competition success ==
- Turku National Cello Competition, 2006 – I prize
- Paolo International Cello Competition, 2007 – IV prize
- International Krzystof Penderecki Cello Competition, 2008 – I prize
