= Robert Kajanus =

Finnish musician (1856–1933)

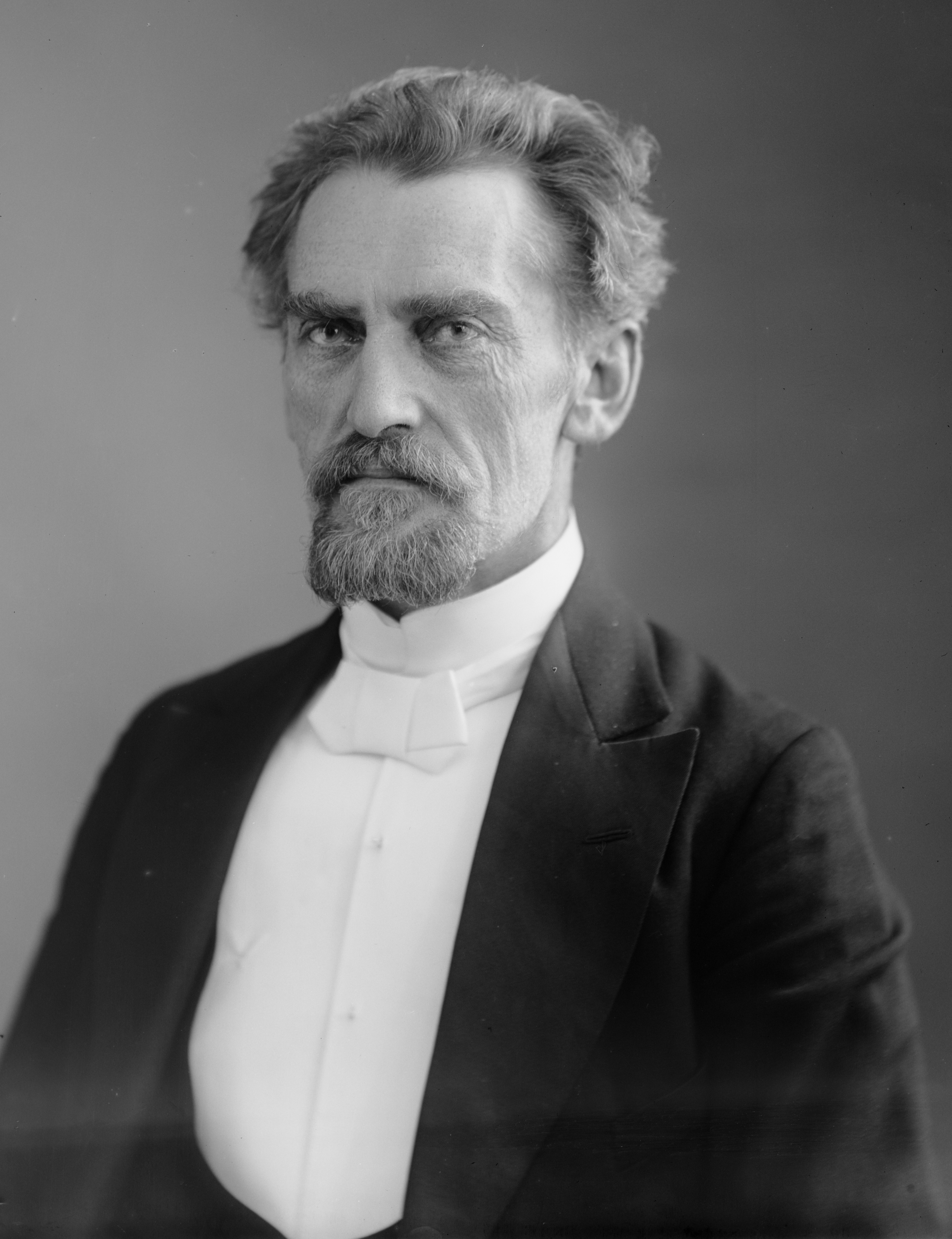
Kajanus (c. 1920s)

Robert Kajanus (2 December 1856 – 6 July 1933) was a Finnish conductor, composer, and teacher. In 1882, he founded the Helsinki Orchestral Society, Finland's first professional orchestra. As a conductor, he was also a notable champion and interpreter of the music of Jean Sibelius.

== Life ==
Kajanus studied music theory with Richard Faltin, violin with Gustaf Niemann in Helsinki, with Hans Richter, Carl Reinecke and Salomon Jadassohn in Leipzig and Johan Svendsen in Paris. His music drew on the folk legends of the Finnish people.

He worked in Dresden in the years immediately after his graduation and returned to Helsinki in 1882. He founded the first permanent orchestra in Finland: the Helsinki Orchestral Society (later to become the Helsinki Philharmonic Orchestra, Finland's national orchestra). He brought the orchestra to a very high-performance standard very quickly, so that they were able to give quite credible performances of the standard late classical/mid-romantic repertory. Kajanus led the Helsinki Philharmonic for 50 years, and among the milestones of that history was the first performance in Finland of Beethoven's Symphony No. 9 in 1888. His early-electric 78-rpm atmospheric, authoritative recordings of Sibelius symphonies are still interpretive milestones.

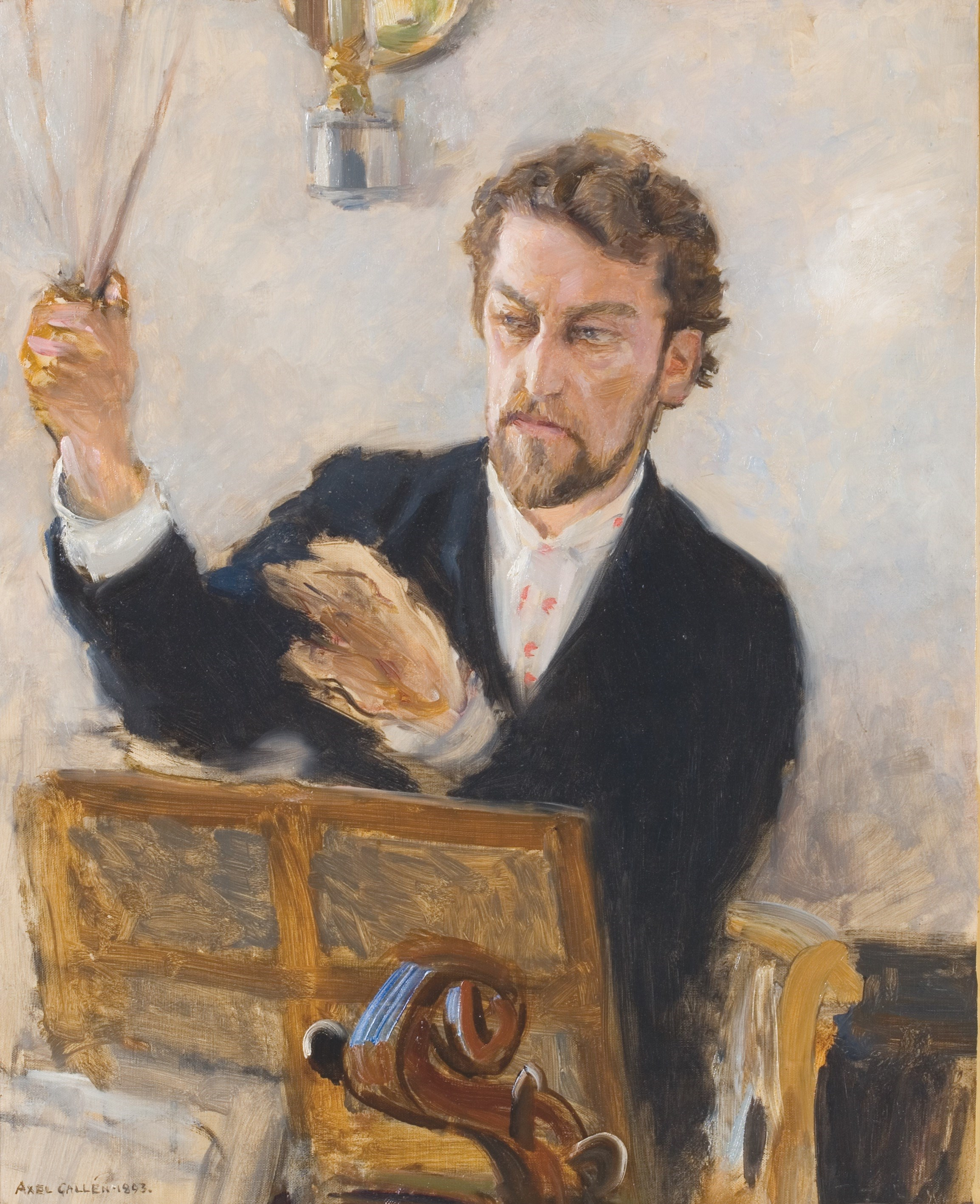
Sketch of Kajanus conducting by Akseli Gallen-Kallela in 1893

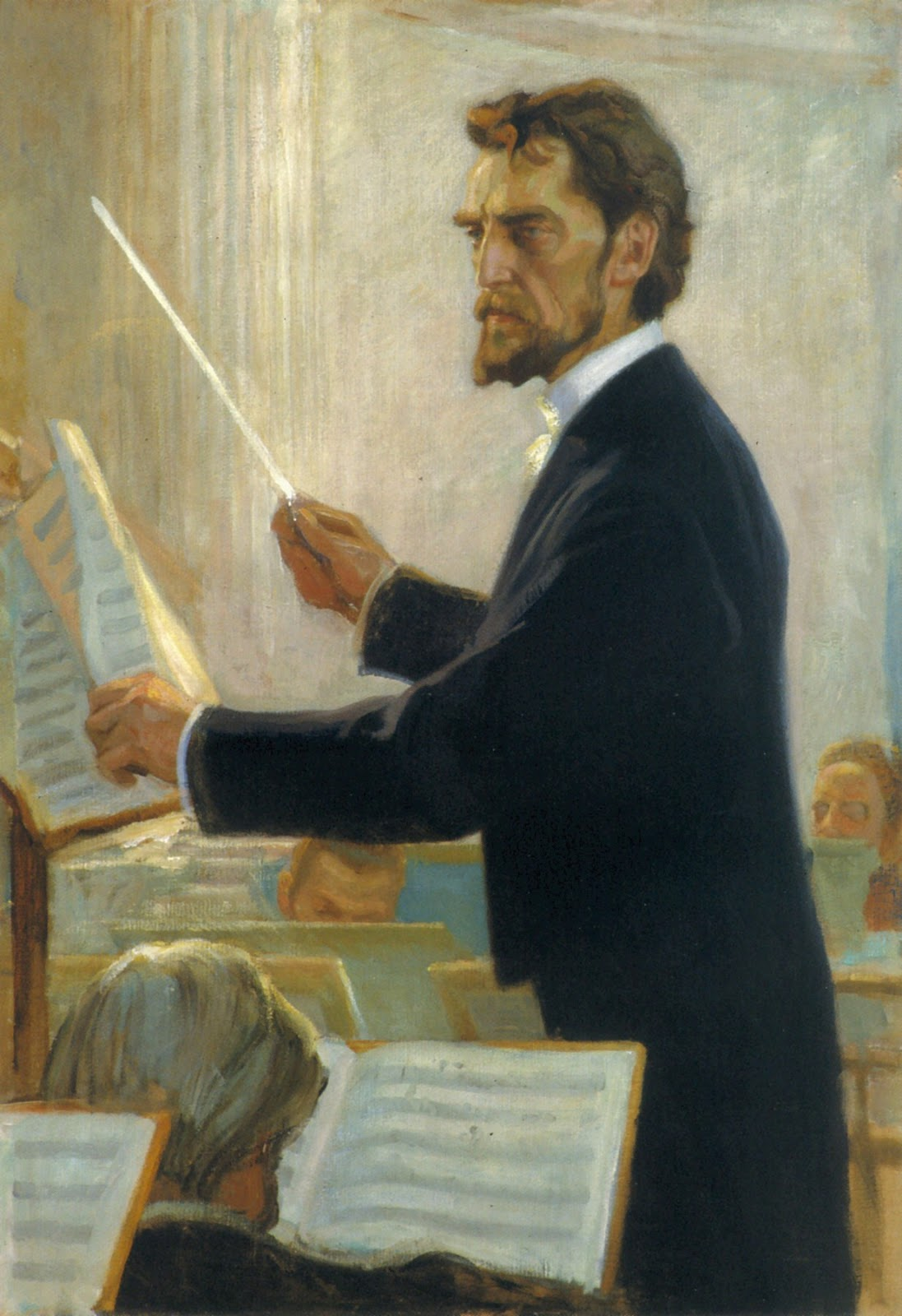
Portrait of Kajanus by Albert Edelfelt, 1905

Kajanus was appointed director of music at the University of Helsinki in 1897 and remained in the post for the next 29 years, a period in which he had a major impact on music education in his native country. In 1917, he became the first president of the Finnish Musicians' Union. He was also the founder of the Nordic Music Festival in 1919. He received many decorations, including the French Légion d'honneur.

== Family ==
Kajanus's parents were Georg August Cajanus and Agnes Ottilia Flodin. Robert Kajanus was the father of harpists Lilly Kajanus-Blenner (1885–1963) and Aino Kajanus-Mangström (1888–1951), and violinist Kaj Kajanus (1908–1994); the grandfather of award-winning Finnish/Norwegian sculptor Johanna Kajanus; and great-grandfather of pop musician and composer Georg Kajanus, who was famous for a while in Great Britain with his band Sailor which enjoyed chart success in the mid-1970s.

== Selected works ==
Kajanus composed over 200 works, of which Aino and the Finnish Rhapsodies are enduringly popular. He also orchestrated the Finnish national anthem, Maamme (Our Country) and Christian Fredric Kress's Porilaisten marssi (March of the People of Pori), the honour march of the Suomen puolustusvoimat (Finnish Defense Forces) and thus, effectively, the Finnish presidential march.

- Adagietto
- Aino, symphonic poem for male chorus and orchestra (1885)
- Suomalainen rapsodia (Finnish rhapsody) No. 1 in D minor, Op. 5 (1881)
- Suomalainen rapsodia (Finnish rhapsody) No. 2 in F major (1886)
- Huutolaistytön kehtolaulu (The Pauper Girl's Lament)
- Kullervon surumarssi (Kullervo's Funeral March), Op. 3 (1880); contains the folk tune "Velisurmaaja" ("The brother-slayer")
- Lyrische Stücke (1879)
- Overtura sinfonica for orchestra (1926)
- Piano Sonata (1876)
- Sechs Albumblätter (1877)
- Sotamarssi (War March), with lyrics by A. Oksanen – arr. by Arvo Kuikka as an honour march of the Suomen ilmavoimat (Finnish Air Force)
- Sinfonietta in B flat major for large orchestra, Op. 16 (1915)
- Suite ancienne for strings (1931)
- Violin Sonata (1876)

== Kajanus and Sibelius ==
Kajanus had a decisive impact on the development of the career of Jean Sibelius. He was considered an authority on the interpretation of Sibelius's music, and he and Sibelius were close friends, but this was compromised in 1898 when Sibelius was appointed to a university post for which Kajanus was himself a candidate. Kajanus appealed, and the decision was overturned. But they reconciled for the orchestra's tour of Europe in 1900, where they appeared at the Exposition Universelle at the invitation of the French government. Kullervo, Sibelius's epic masterpiece, was written in the wake of Kajanus' symphonic poem Aino although Sibelius denied any exertion of influence of this piece over his own work. Additionally, as a conductor, Kajanus was responsible for commissioning one of Sibelius' most popular and enduring works, En Saga, following the success of Kullervo. Pohjola's Daughter was dedicated to Kajanus. When Kajanus took the Helsinki Orchestra on a tour of Europe in 1900 both he and Sibelius conducted, including what proved to be the first performances of Sibelius's music outside of Finland. This ensured the spread of the young composer's reputation far beyond the borders of his homeland, the first Finnish composer to receive such attention.

Kajanus was the first to make recordings of Sibelius's First, Second, Third and Fifth symphonies and Tapiola. They were recorded in the early 1930s, with the London Symphony Orchestra. The relationship between Kajanus and Sibelius was such that his interpretations of the composer's music are usually regarded as authentic.

In 1930, the Finnish government and Britain's EMI-Columbia label, perceiving a potentially wide audience for the composer's work, jointly arranged to record Sibelius's first two symphonies, and Kajanus was selected to record both at the insistence of the composer. In 1932, Kajanus recorded Symphonies Nos. 3 and 5, along with orchestral suites and tone poems. This was a massive recording project for the work of a living composer, and the recordings have been considered definitive for many years and are regarded as necessary listening in the study of Sibelius. Only his death in July 1933, at the age of 76, prevented Kajanus from recording all of Sibelius' Symphonies.

== See also ==
- Golden Age of Finnish Art

Preceded by none	Principal Conductor, Helsinki Philharmonic Orchestra; 1882–1932	Succeeded by Georg Schnéevoigt
