= 1943 in Nordic music =

The following is a list of notable events and compositions of the year 1943 in Nordic music.

== Events ==
- March – Having made her last film appearance in Nazi Germany, still declining to take out German citizenship, Zarah Leander leaves Berlin for her native Sweden.
- 27 March – The Royal Theatre in Copenhagen stages the European première of George Gershwin's Porgy and Bess.
- 29 October – Uuno Klami's Violin Concerto is premièred in Helsinki, with Toivo Haapanen conducting the Helsinki Philharmonic Orchestra, and soloist Anja Ignatius.
- unknown date
  - Danish pianist and composer Herman David Koppel leaves Denmark for Sweden with his Jewish family to avoid persecution by the Nazis.
  - In a diary entry, Jean Sibelius expresses regret at having signed the Aryan certificate.
  - In celebration of Edvard Grieg's centenary, Norway's far-right governing country, Nasjonal Samling, commissions a propaganda film.

== New works ==
- Páll Ísólfsson – Veislan á Sólhaugum (The Feast at Solhaug) (incidental music)
- Uuno Klami – Violin Concerto; later revised
- Paul von Klenau – String Quartet No. 2
- Jón Leifs
  - Íslendingaljóð
  - 3 söngvar eftir Jónas Hallgrímsson

== Popular music ==
- Hugo Alfvén – "Herr Olof i älvornas dans"
- Anna-Lisa Frykman – "Julpolskan" (in Nu ska vi sjunga)

== Film music ==
- Carl-Olof Anderberg & Kai Gullmar – Sonja
- Nils-Eric Fougstedt – Katariina ja Munkkiniemen kreivi
- Lars-Erik Larsson & Nathan Görling – Elvira Madigan
- Poul Schierbeck – Vredens dag

== Births ==
- 23 March – Nils-Aslak Valkeapää, Finnish Sami artist, writer and musician (died 2001)
- 10 April – Bo Hansson, Swedish progressive rock musician (died 2010)
- 16 April – Erling Kroner, jazz trombonist, composer and bandleader (died 2011)
- 22 July – Hans Wärmling, Swedish musician and songwriter (died 1995)
- 28 August – Anne-Lise Berntsen, Norwegian soprano (died 2012)

== Deaths ==
- 1 April – Anders Hovden, Norwegian classical pianist, composer and radio personality (born 1860)
- 26 May – Alice Tegnér, Swedish organist and composer (born 1864)
- 23 November – Torolf Voss, Norwegian conductor and composer (born 1877)

== See also ==
- 1943 in Denmark
- 1943 in Iceland
- 1943 in Norwegian music
- 1943 in Sweden
