= Violin Concerto (Klami) =

Concerto in three movements by Uuno Klami

- by Uuno Klami
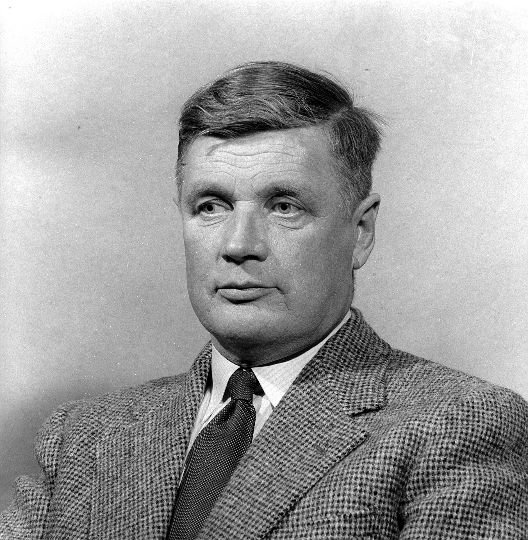
- The composer
- Opus: 32
- Composed: 1940–1943; rev. 1953–1954
- Duration: Approx. 28 minutes
- Movements: 3

Premiere
- Date: 29 October 1943
- Location: Helsinki, Finland
- Conductor: Toivo Haapanen
- Performers: Helsinki Philharmonic Orchestra; Anja Ignatius

The Violin Concerto, Op. 32, is a three-movement concertante composition for violin and orchestra written from 1940 to 1943 by the Finnish composer Uuno Klami. The piece premiered on 29 October 1943 in Helsinki, Finland, with Toivo Haapanen conducting the Helsinki Philharmonic Orchestra; the soloist was the Finnish violinist Anja Ignatius. However, in 1944, the autograph manuscript was lost when Ignatius played the concerto in Stockholm. Klami rewrote the piece from 1953 to 1954: this new version he based on the old, albeit with substantial alterations to each of the three movements. On 9 April 1954, Ignatius, Haapanen, and the Helsinki Philharmonic Orchestra premiered the revised concerto.

Although the original score was eventually found in the archives of the Swedish Broadcasting Corporation in 1957, the 1954 version had already by then become established in the repertoire. According to Heikki Poroila, the two versions are so different from each other that they "should be treated as independent works". (Note: The original Finnish is: "Versiot ovat niin erilaisia, että niitä on syytä käsitellä itsenäisinä teoksi-na".)

== Structure ==
The Violin Concerto is in three movements. They are as follows:

1. Allegro molto moderato
2. Adagio ma non troppo
3. Allegro giocoso

== Recordings ==
The sortable table below lists commercially available recordings of the Violin Concerto:

No.	Conductor	Orchestra	Soloist	Rec. (Note: Refers to the year in which the performers recorded the work; this may not be the same as the year in which the recording was first released to the general public.)	Time	Recording venue	Label	Ref.
1	Eero Bister	Kouvola City Orchestra	Ilkka Talvi	1981	27:27	Central Church, Kouvola	Finlandia	(Note: E. Bister–Finlandia (FACD 702) 1991)
2	Jukka-Pekka Saraste	Finnish Radio Symphony Orchestra	Kaija Saarikettu	1988	26:04	?	Yle	(Note: J. Saraste–Yle (YLE CDY 341) 1996)
3	Osmo Vänskä	Lahti Symphony Orchestra	Jennifer Koh	1996	28:44	Ristinkirkko	BIS	(Note: O. Vänskä–BIS (CD–696) 1997)
4	Dmitri Slobodeniouk	Kymi Sinfonietta	Pekka Kauppinen	2005	28:36	Kuusaa Hall, Kuusankoskitalo	Alba	(Note: D. Slobodeniouk–Alba (ABCD 235) 2008)
5	Johannes Gustavsson	Oulu Symphony Orchestra	Benkamin Schmid	2016	28:09	Madetoja Hall, Oulu Music Centre	Ondine	(Note: J. Gustavsson–Ondine (ODE 1278–2) 2016)

== Notes, references, and sources ==
Notes

Sources

- Aho, Kalevi (1997). Uuno Klami: Whirls, Act 1 / Violin Concerto / Suomenlinna (CD booklet). Translated by Barnett, Andrew. Osmo Vänskä & Lahti Symphony Orchestra. BIS. p. 4–9. CD–696. OCLC 40569371
- Korhonen, Kimmo (2016). Uuno Klami / Einar Englund: Violin Concertos (CD booklet). Translated by Mäntyjärvi, Jaakko. Johannes Gustavsson & Oulu Symphony Orchestra. Ondine. p. 3–8. ODE 1278–2. OCLC 966451034
- Poroila, Heikki (2012). Yhtenäistetty Uuno Klami [List of Works by Uuno Klami]. Helsinki: Suomen musiikkikirjastoyhdistys (Finnish Music Library Association). ISBN 978-952-5363-30-2.
