= Tuulio =

Tuulio is a surname. Notable people with the surname include:

- Oiva Tuulio (1878–1941), Finnish linguist
- Tyyni Tuulio (1892–1991), Finnish writer
