= Symphony No. 1 (Klami) =

Symphony in four movements by Uuno Klami

- by Uuno Klami
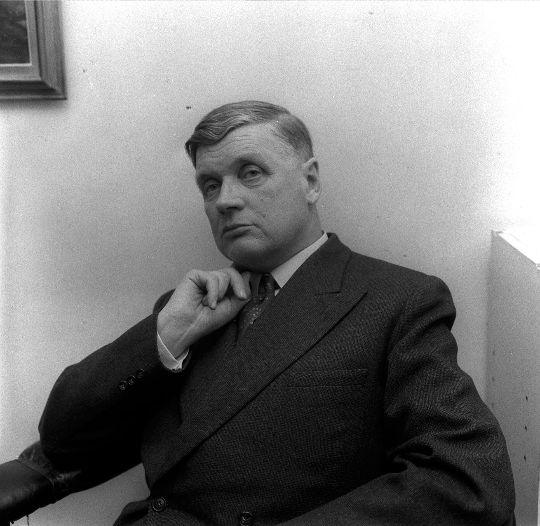
- The composer in 1959
- Composed: 1937–38
- Duration: Approx. 43 minutes
- Movements: 4

Premiere
- Date: 5 May 1939
- Location: Helsinki, Finland
- Conductor: Georg Schnéevoigt
- Performers: Helsinki Philharmonic Orchestra

The Symphony No. 1 is a four-movement orchestral composition by the Finnish composer Uuno Klami, who wrote the piece from 1937 to 1938. Georg Schnéevoigt and the Helsinki Philharmonic Orchestra premiered the work on 5 May 1939; later that year, Klami enlisted in the Finnish military and fought against the Soviet Union in the Winter War.

Although the Symphony No. 1 is the first of Klami's two numbered symphonies, it was preceded by the Symphonie enfantine (Children's Symphony), Op. 17, a 1928 composition for chamber orchestra.

== Orchestration ==
The First Symphony is scored for the following instruments:

- Woodwind: piccolo, 3 flutes, 2 oboes, 2 clarinets, and 2 bassoons
- Brass: 4 horns, 3 trumpets, 3 trombones, and tuba
- Percussion: timpani, bass drum, snare drum, and cymbals
- Strings: violins, violas, cellos, and double basses

== Structure ==
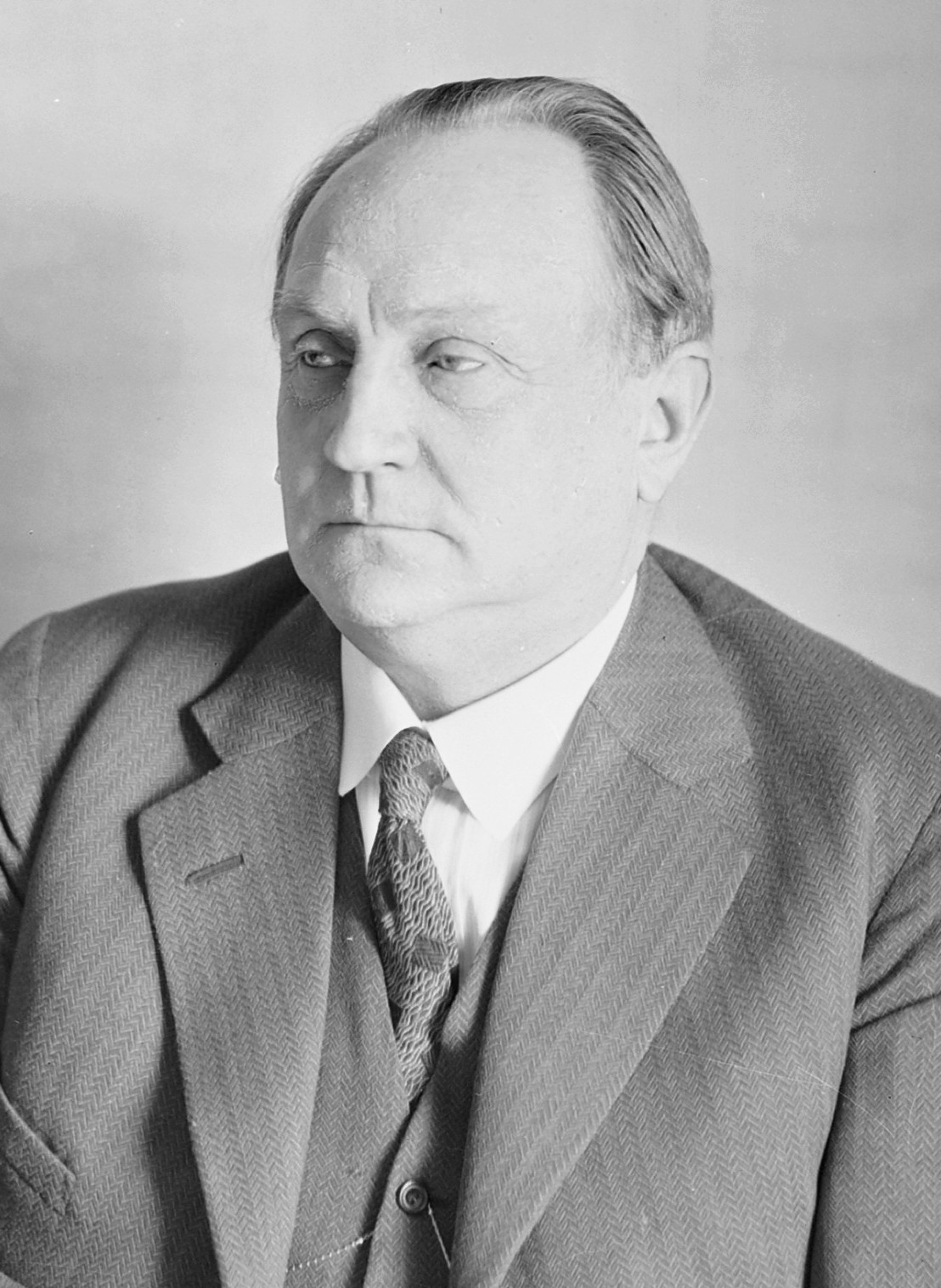
The Finnish conductor Georg Schnéevoigt conducted the premiere of the First Symphony in 1939.

The First Symphony is in four movements. They are as follows:

1. Allegro non troppo
2. Prestissimo
3. Andante molto
4. Allegro maestoso

== Discography ==
The sortable table below lists the only commercially available recording of the First Symphony:

Conductor	Orchestra	Year	Runtime	Venue	Label	Ref.						
Conductor	Orchestra	Year	Runtime	Venue	Label	Ref.	Tuomas Ollila-Hannikainen	Tampere Philharmonic Orchestra	1995	43:45	Tampere Hall	Ondine (ODE 854–2)

== References and sources ==
=== Sources ===
- Poroila, Heikki (2012). Yhtenäistetty Uuno Klami (List of Works by Uuno Klami). Helsinki: Suomen musiikkikirjastoyhdistys (Finnish Music Library Association). ISBN 978-952-5363-30-2.
- Tyrväinen, Helena (1995). Uuno Klami: Symphony No. 1 / King Lear Ouverture (CD booklet). Tuomas Ollila-Hannikainen & Tampere Philharmonic Orchestra. Ondine. ODE 854–2. OCLC 36076621
- "Uuno Klami: Years, Compositions: 1930–1940". uunoklami.fi/en. The Uuno Klami Society. 2009.
