= Suomenlinna (Klami) =

Orchestral composition by Uuno Klami

- Concert overture by Uuno Klami
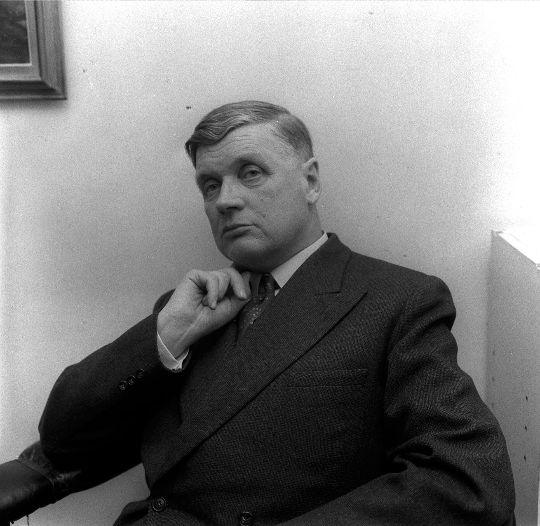
- The composer in 1959
- Opus: 30
- Composed: 1939–40, lost; rewritten 1944
- Duration: Approx. 12 minutes

Premiere
- Date: 21 March 1941
- Location: Stockholm, Sweden
- Conductor: Tor Mann
- Performers: Swedish Radio Symphony Orchestra

Suomenlinna (literal translation: 'The Castle of Finland'), Op. 30, is concert overture for orchestra written between 1939 and 1940 by the Finnish composer Uuno Klami, who had visited the eponymous island sea fortress. Tor Mann and the Swedish Radio Symphony Orchestra premiered the work in Stockholm on 21 May 1941. The overture is in sonata form, with its main theme in C major and second theme in D-flat major.

The piece was lost in Germany during the "chaos" World War II, prompting Klami to rewrite it in 1944 based on his original sketches. Around this time, Klami renamed the overture Linna meren äärellä (The Fortress on the Sea), but this name has never stuck. The second version of the overture was premiered on 15 December 1944. The music critic Sulho Ranta argued that, although "the thematic material... [had] not greatly changed" between versions, "the revision [had] proved to be to the work's advantage". (Note: Sulho Ranta's review is quoted, without precise attribution, in the liner notes to BIS–CD–696. Ranta (1901–1960)—an exact contemporary of Klami's who, too, had studied composition at the Helsinki Music Institute under Erkki Melartin—likely penned this review for Ilta-Sanomat, for which he wrote under the pseudonym 'Särrä' from 1933 to 1957. (In 1944, the paper would have still been the afternoon edition of Helsingin Sanomat, rather than an independent publication.))

On 29 September 1950 in celebration of Klami's fiftieth birthday, Jussi Jalas and the Helsinki Philharmonic Orchestra performed the overture. It shared the program with Klami's most famous work, the Kalevala Suite (Op. 23, 1933; r. 1934, 1943), and the Second Piano Concerto (Op. 41, 1950), which received its premiere.

== Discography ==
The sortable table below lists the three commercially available recordings of Suomenlinna:

Conductor	Orchestra	Year	Runtime	Venue	Label	Ref.						
Conductor	Orchestra	Year	Runtime	Venue	Label	Ref.	Osmo Vänskä	Lahti Symphony Orchestra	1993	12:33	Ristinkirkko	BIS (CD–696)
Jorma Panula	Turku Philharmonic Orchestra	1996	11:01	Turku Concert Hall	Naxos (8.553757)							
Leif Segerstam	Helsinki Philharmonic Orchestra	2007	11:55	Finlandia Hall	Ondine (ODE 1112–2)							

== Notes, references, and sources ==
=== Sources ===
- Aho, Kalevi (1997). Uuno Klami: Whirls, Act I / Violin Concerto / Suomenlinna (CD booklet). Osmo Vänskä & Lahti Symphony Orchestra. BIS. CD–696. OCLC 40569371
- Korhonen, Kimmo (1998). Uuno Klami: Kalevala Suite / Sea Pictures / Lemminkäinen's Adventures on the Island of Saari (CD booklet). Jorma Panula & Turku Philharmonic Orchestra. Naxos. 8.553757. OCLC 40795112
- Poroila, Heikki (2012). Yhtenäistetty Uuno Klami (List of Works by Uuno Klami). Helsinki: Suomen musiikkikirjastoyhdistys (Finnish Music Library Association). ISBN 978-952-5363-30-2.
- "Uuno Klami: Years, Compositions: 1930–1940". uunoklami.fi/en. The Uuno Klami Society. 2009.
- "Uuno Klami: Years, Compositions: 1940–1961". uunoklami.fi/en. The Uuno Klami Society. 2009.
