= Symphonie enfantine (Klami) =

Symphonic work in three movements by Uuno Klami

- by Uuno Klami
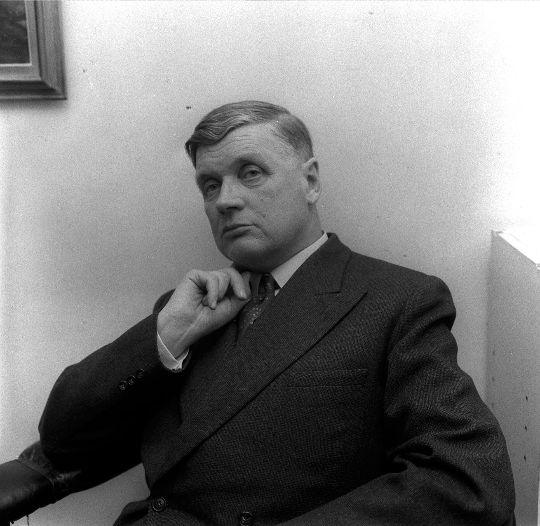
- The composer in 1959
- Opus: 17
- Composed: 1928
- Publisher: Music Finland (MF6275)
- Duration: Approx. 17 minutes
- Movements: 3

Premiere
- Date: 14 December 1931
- Location: Helsinki, Finland
- Conductor: Toivo Haapanen
- Performers: Helsinki Philharmonic Orchestra

The Symphonie enfantine (in Finnish: Lapsisinfonia; English translation: 'Children's Symphony') is a three-movement composition for chamber orchestra by the Finnish composer Uuno Klami, who wrote the piece in 1928 (and possibly into 1929). (Note: The score lists 1928 as the date of composition.) Toivo Haapanen and the Helsinki Philharmonic Orchestra premiered the work at the University of Helsinki on 14 December 1931, during Klami's "highly-acclaimed" second composition concert. Symphonic in name rather than in technique, the Symphonie enfantine is the first of Klami's three symphonies and the only of the series to not receive a number: the First Symphony arrived subsequently in 1938 and the Second Symphony (Op. 35) in 1945.

== History ==
During its premiere it shared the program with the Tšeremissiläinen fantasia (Cheremissian Fantasy), a concertante piece for cello and orchestra (Op. 19, 1931; cellist Ossian Fohström), as well as 3 Bf from the orchestral suite Merikuvia (Sea Pictures) (then still in progress; 1930–32) and the concert waltz Opernredoute (Op. 20, 1929).

== Orchestration ==
The Symphonie enfantine is scored for a "petit orchestra" that includes the following instruments:

- Woodwind: flute, oboe, cor anglais, clarinet, and bassoon
- Brass: horn and trumpet
- Percussion: timpani and tambourine
- Strings: 12 violins, 7 violas, 3 cellos, 3 double basses, and harp

== Structure ==
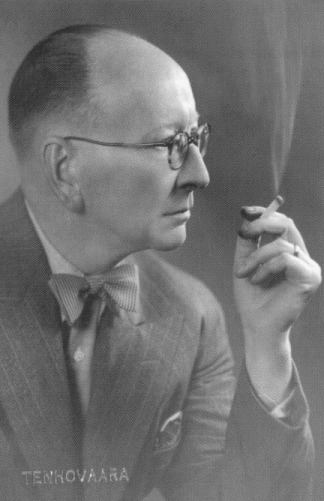
The Finnish conductor Toivo Haapanen conducted the premiere of the Symphonie enfantine in 1931.

The Symphonie enfantine is in three movements. They are as follows:

1. Poco agitato
2. Berceuse: Andante
3. Molto vivo

== Discography ==
The sortable table below lists the three commercially available recordings of the Symphonie enfantine:

Conductor	Orchestra	Year	Runtime	Venue	Label	Ref.						
Conductor	Orchestra	Year	Runtime	Venue	Label	Ref.	Tuomas Ollila-Hannikainen	Tampere Philharmonic Orchestra	1995	14:37	Tampere Hall	Ondine (ODE 858–2)
Jean-Jacques Kantorow	Tapiola Sinfonietta	1996	16:04	Tapiola Concert Hall	BIS (CD–806)							
Juha Nikkola	Kymi Sinfonietta	2001	16:28	Kuusaukoski Hall	Alba (ABCD 171)							

== Notes, references, and sources ==
=== Sources ===
- Aho, Kalevi (1997). Uuno Klami: Symphonie enfantine / Hommage à Haendel / Suite for Strings / Suite for Small Orchestra (CD booklet). Jean-Jacques Kantorow & Tapiola Sinfonietta. BIS. CD–806. OCLC 39797823
- Hannele, Dolk (2002). Klami: Rhapsodie (CD booklet). Juha Nikkola & Kymi Sinfonietta. Alba. ABCD–171. OCLC 56115468
- Poroila, Heikki (2012). Yhtenäistetty Uuno Klami (List of Works by Uuno Klami). Helsinki: Suomen musiikkikirjastoyhdistys (Finnish Music Library Association). ISBN 978-952-5363-30-2.
- Tyrväinen, Helena (1996). Uuno Klami: Symphony No. 2 / Symphonie enfantine (CD booklet). Tuomas Ollila-Hannikainen & Tampere Philharmonic Orchestra. Ondine. ODE 858-2. OCLC 36076789
- "Uuno Klami: Years, Compositions: 1930–1940". uunoklami.fi/en. The Uuno Klami Society. 2009.
