= Ellegaard =

Ellegaard is a Danish surname. Notable people with the surname include:

- France Ellegaard (1913–1999), Danish pianist and music educator
- Jeanne Ellegaard (born 1987), Danish curler
- Kevin Stuhr-Ellegaard (born 1983), Danish footballer
- Mogens Ellegaard (1935–1995), Danish musicians
- Thorvald Ellegaard (1877–1954), Danish cyclist
