= Kyrö Skantz =

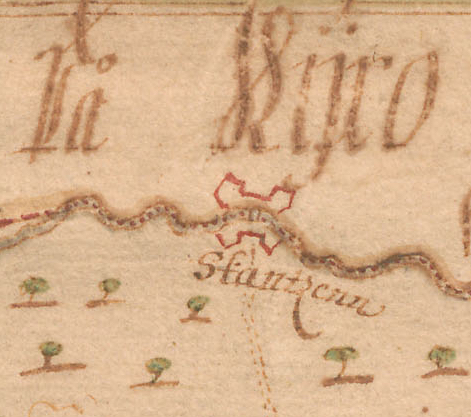
Kyrö Skantz fortress on a 17th-century map stored at National Archives of Finland. National Board of Survey Maps. MH 13.

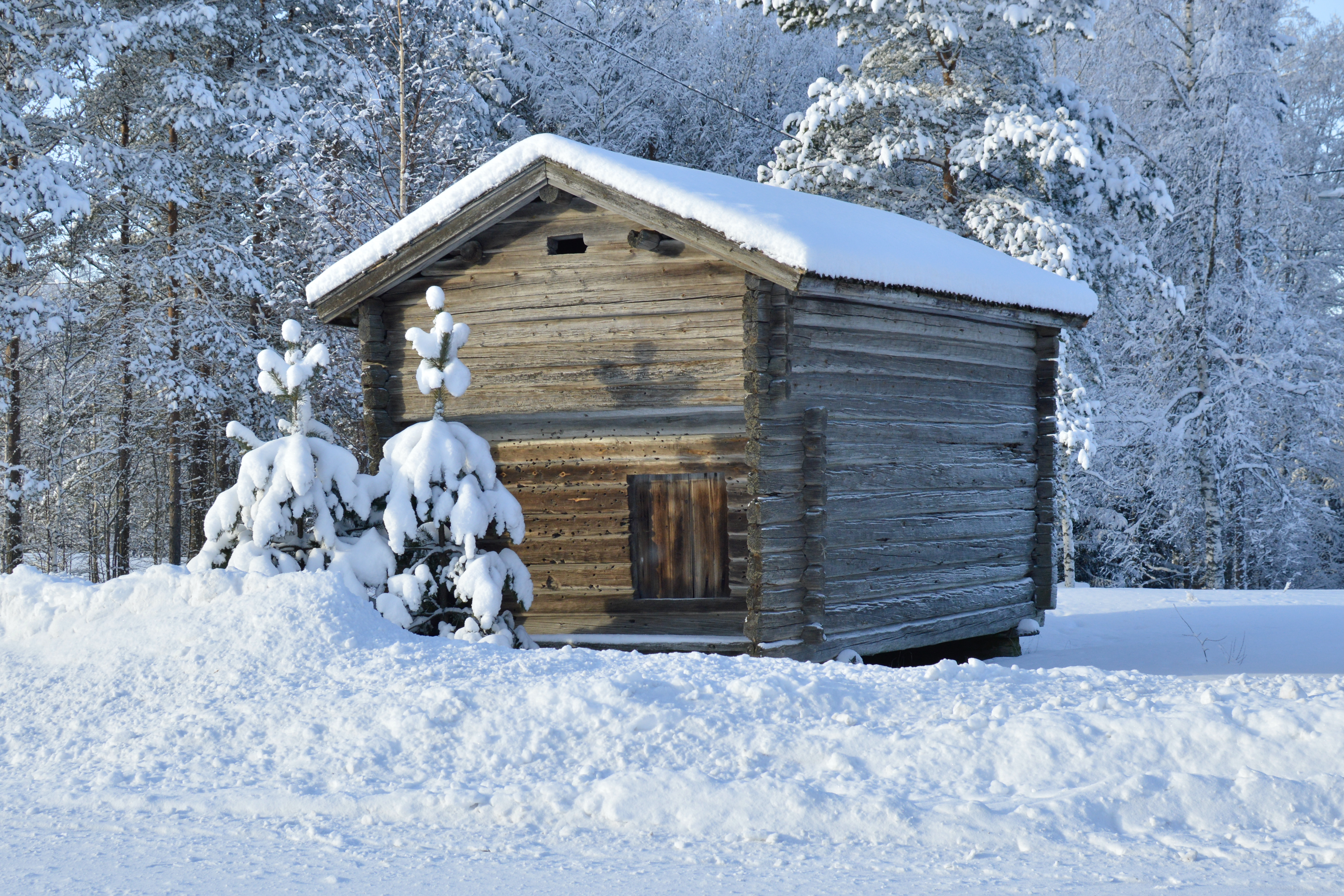
The oldest building in Kyrö Skantz area, built ca. 1710

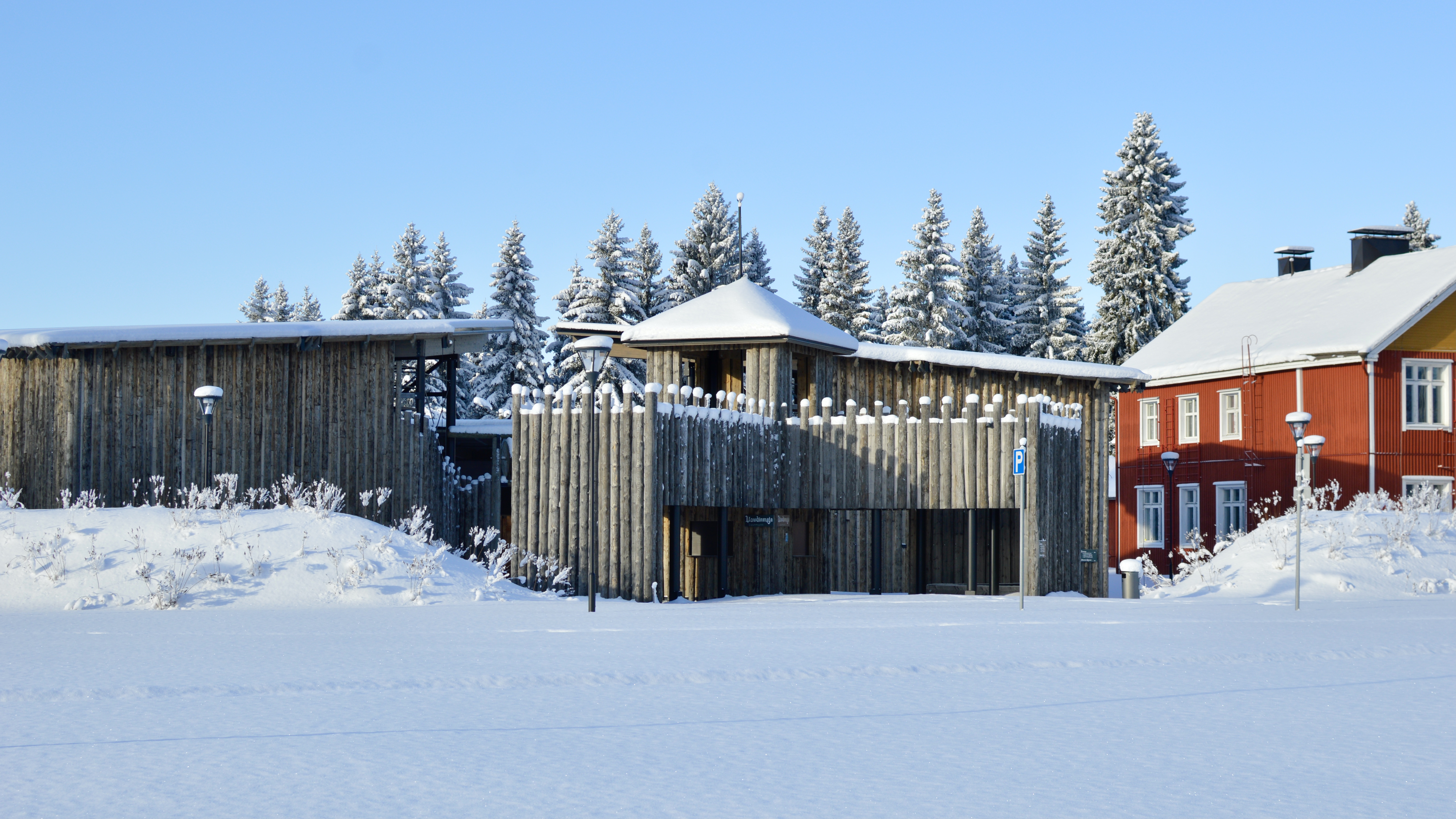
Kyrö Skantz fortress has given inspiration to Cultural Center Skantz which was established in 2019.

Kyrö Skantz, or Kyrön skanssi (Finnish) or Kyrö skans (Swedish), was a fortress built for the Swedish army in the 17th century. The ruins of Kyrö Skantz are located in Karvia, Finland. It is obvious that there was a small military base at the same area in the late 16th century but there is only very little information available about it.

Major Göran Svinhufvud was ordered to build Kyrö Skantz in 1632 during the reign of King Gustaf II Adolph. The wooden fortress was built near the Kyrönkankaantie road, which was the main road between Southern Finland and Ostrobothnia for a long time. Major Svinhufvud was also named as the Commandant of Kyrö Skantz in 1635. The Kyrö Skantz fortress was active during the years 1635–1639 and 1656–1659. After the year 1659 Kyrö Skantz was left unmanned.

A tavern was established in Kyrö Skantz as early as 1640. The first tavern keeper was Yrjö Luukkanpoika (Jöran Lukasson) Kontti from Jämijärvi. During the Great Northern War the Kyrö Skantz tavern and the nearby buildings were destroyed by Russian troops in 1713. It took about ten years until the Kyrö Skantz tavern could operate again. The Kyrö Skantz tavern was active until the end of the 19th century.

King of Sweden Adolf Fredrik visited the Kyrö Skantz tavern when he travelled from Turku to Vaasa along the Kyrönkankaantie road in July 1752.

There are several folk tales about well-known copper gates of Kyrö Skantz that were sunk into River Karvianjoki before Russian troops arrived. None has found the copper gates since then.

The Kyrö Skantz fortress has given inspiration to the coat of arms of Karvia as well as the Cultural Center Skantz, which was established in 2019.
