= Kalevala Suite =

Orchestral suite by Uuno Klami (1943)

- Tone pictures by Uuno Klami
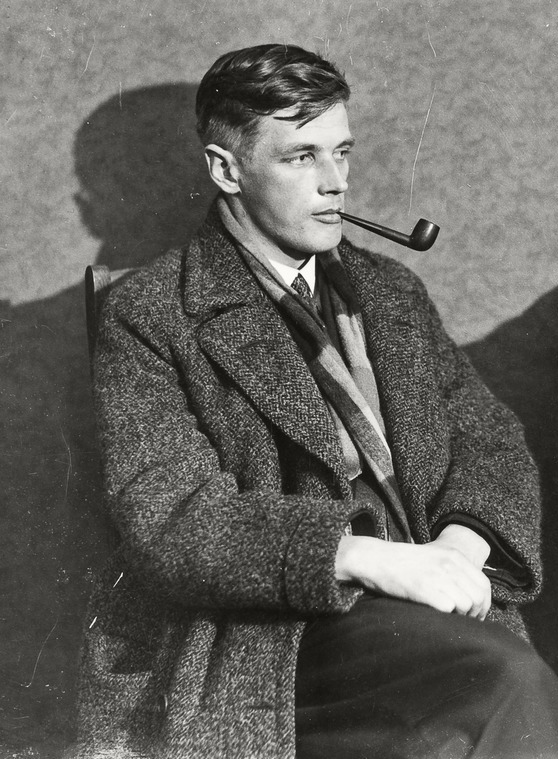
- The composer (c. 1930)
- Native name: Kalevala-sarja
- Catalogue: 23
- Based on: Kalevala (Runos I–II, X, XV)
- Composed: 1930–1933, rev. 1934, 1943
- Publisher: Fazer Music (1951)
- Duration: 30 minutes
- Movements: 5 (originally 4)

Premiere
- Date: 10 February 1933
- Location: Helsinki, Finland
- Conductor: Georg Schnéevoigt
- Performers: Helsinki Philharmonic Orchestra

The Kalevala Suite (in Finnish: Kalevala-sarja), Op. 23, is a five-movement concert suite for orchestra written from 1930 to 1933 by the Finnish composer Uuno Klami and based upon Runos I–II, X, and XV of the Kalevala, Finland's national epic. The original version of the suite, which was in four movements, dissatisfied the composer because its lack of central scherzo made the work seem imbalanced. His first attempt at revision came in 1934 with Lemminkäinen's Island Adventures (Lemminkäisen seikkailut saaressa; based on Runo XXIX) as Movement III, but its considerable length presented a new problem, causing Klami to withdraw it from the suite and make it an independent work. In 1943, he again revised the Kalevala Suite, adding Terhenniemi as the new scherzo.

Klami sought to approach the Kalevala from a perspective that would differ that of Jean Sibelius, his predecessor, whom he thought had "reigned supreme in the domain"; Sibelius's notable Kalevala-themed works include the tone poems The Swan of Tuonela, Pohjola's Daughter, and Tapiola.

== Structure ==
The Kalevala Suite is in five movements, of which Nos. I–II and IV–V were written completed by 1933; No. III was added in 1943:

1. The Creation of the Earth (Maan synty). Agitato e misterioso
2. The Spout of Spring (Kevään oras). Andante, molto tranquillo
3. Terhenniemi. Allegro, leggiero e scherzando
4. Cradle Song for Lemminkäinen (Kehtolaulu Lemminkäiselle). Andante mosso
5. The Forging of the Sampo (Sammon taonta). Allegro moderato

Movement II is played attacca.

== Instrumentation ==
The Kalevala Suite is scored for the following instruments, organized by family (woodwinds, brass, percussion, and strings):

- 1 piccolo, 2 flutes, 2 oboes, 1 cor anglais, 2 clarinets (in B♭), 1 bass clarinet (in B♭), 2 bassoons, and 1 contrabassoon
- 4 horns (in F), 4 trumpets (in B♭), 3 trombones, and 1 tuba
- Timpani, bass drum, snare drum, xylophone (Movement III only), cymbals, triangle, tam-tam, and tubular bells ("campana"; Movement V only)
- Violins (I and II), violas, cellos, double basses, and harp

== Discography ==
The sortable table below contains commercially available recordings of the complete Kalevala Suite: The table below lists commercially available recordings:

No.	Conductor	Ensemble	Rec. (Note: Refers to the year in which the performers recorded the work; this may not be the same as the year in which the recording was first released to the general public.)	Runtime (Note: All runtimes are official, as printed on CD or LP liner notes.)						Recording venue	Label	Ref.
No.	Conductor	Ensemble	Rec.	Total	I	II	III	IV	V	Recording venue	Label	Ref.
1	Nils-Eric Fougstedt	Finlandia Orchestra	c. 1957	?	?	?	?	?	?	?	Fennica	(Note: N. Fougstedt—Fennica (SS 5) 1957)
2	Jorma Panula (1)	Helsinki Philharmonic Orchestra (1)	1973	30:09	12:03 (Note: Given that No. 2 is played attacca, this recording combines the runtime for Nos.1–2.)		6:18	4:46	6:54	Kulttuuritalo	Finnlevy	(Note: J. Panula—Finnlevy (SFX 4) 1973)
3	Leif Segerstam	Finnish Radio Symphony Orchestra	1987	31:32	6:59	4:34	6:34	6:25	7:00	Kulttuuritalo	Finlandia	(Note: L. Segerstam—Finlandia (FACD 356) 1987)
4	Petri Sakari	Iceland Symphony Orchestra	1993	32:49	7:33	5:22	6:38	5:43	7:29	Háskólabíó	Chandos	(Note: P. Sakari—Chandos (CHAN 10427 X) 2007)
5	Osmo Vänskä	Lahti Symphony Orchestra (1)	1994	29:43	6:43	4:48	6:16	4:51	6:50	Ristinkirkko	BIS	(Note: O. Vänskä—BIS (CD–676) 1994)
6	Jorma Panula (2)	Turku Philharmonic Orchestra	1996	29:56	6:41	4:33	6:29	4:17	7:00	Turku Concert Hall	Naxos	(Note: J. Panula—Naxos (8.553757) 1998)
7	John Storgårds	Helsinki Philharmonic Orchestra (2)	2009	32:56	7:16	5:09	7:06	5:49	7:25	Finlandia Hall	Ondine	(Note: J. Storgårds—Ondine (ODE 1143–2) 2010)
8	Dima Slobodeniouk	Lahti Symphony Orchestra (2)	2017	29:15	6:38	4:34	6:42	5:15	5:50	Sibelius Hall	BIS	(Note: D. Slobodeniouk—BIS (BIS–2371) 2021)

== Notes, references, and sources ==
Notes

Sources

- Poroila, Heikki (2012). Yhtenäistetty Uuno Klami (List of Works by Uuno Klami). Helsinki: Suomen musiikkikirjastoyhdistys (Finnish Music Library Association). ISBN 978-952-5363-30-2.
- Salmenhaara, Erkki (1994). Uuno Klami: Whirls, Ballet: Suites 1 & 2 / Lemminkäinen's Island Adventures / Song of Lake Kuujärvi (CD booklet). Osmo Vänskä & Lahti Symphony Orchestra. BIS. CD–656.
- Tyrväinen, Helena (2010). Uuno Klami: Northern Lights / Cheremissian Fantasy / Kalevala Suite (CD booklet). Translated by Mäntyjärvi, Jaakko [in Finnish]. John Storgårds & Helsinki Philharmonic Orchestra. Ondine. ODE 1143–2.
