= Ernst Schnéevoigt =

German-born conductor

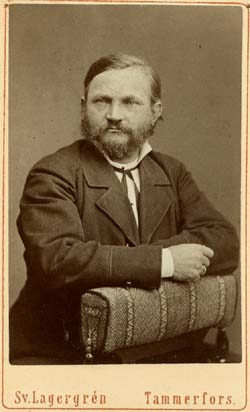

Ernst Bernhard Schnéevoigt (1835 - 1905) was a German-born conductor who moved to Finland.

Schnéevoigt grew up in and obtained his music education in Germany. He traveled to Helsinki in 1860 to play in the Filip von Schantz Orchestra, after that he moved to Stockholm for a year with the orchestra. Schnéevoigt returned to Finland to live in Vyborg, where he conducted orchestral activities from 1869 to 1878.

Schnéevoigt was married to Rosa Willandt, with whom he had five children: Adèle Ernestine Trebbe, Elsa Emilia Schnéevoigt, Siri Schnéevoigt, Georg Schnéevoigt and Anna Gerda Schnéevoigt.
