= Ilkka Talvi =

Finnish violinist (born 1948)

Ilkka Talvi (born 22 October 1948) is a Finnish violinist and author of the blog Of Music and Men.

== Education ==
Initially self-taught, Talvi later studied with Arno Granroth, a pupil of Jacques Thibaud, at the Sibelius Academy. After winning the Scandinavian Young Artist Competition, Talvi furthered his studies in Paris, Vienna and the United States. His teachers included Gabriel Bouillon, Ricardo Odnoposoff, Ivan Galamian at the Curtis Institute and the eminent violinist Jascha Heifetz at University of Southern California.

== Performance career ==
As a recitalist and soloist, Talvi performed extensively in Europe and in the U.S. He was on the faculty of the Sibelius Academy in Helsinki and the Conservatory of Music in Pori, both in Finland. Before emigrating to the U.S. he was concertmaster of the Malmö Symphony Orchestra in Sweden. For several years Talvi worked for the famous Bach expert Helmuth Rilling both in Eugene, Oregon, and in Stuttgart, Germany.

In 1984, Talvi left his position as principal second violin of the Los Angeles Chamber Orchestra to become concertmaster of the Seattle Symphony (under its new music director Gerard Schwarz) and Seattle Opera, a position he held for 20 years. He was also concertmaster of the Mostly Mozart Festival at Lincoln Center. During his tenure as concertmaster for Seattle Symphony, Talvi premiered and recorded concertos by David Diamond and Stephen Albert, as well as Paul Creston's "Partita" and Richard Strauss*' "Ein Heldenleben", and other orchestral works. Talvi recorded the Uuno Klami violin concerto on Finlandia label.

Although Talvi's personal contract stated that he would be concertmaster for the duration of Schwarz' music director post, in 2004 the Seattle Symphony did not renew Talvi's contract.

Despite setbacks including court ordered arbitration and personal attacks on key figures posted on Talvi's blog, which were retracted under threat of libel, the case was resolved through mediation.

Talvi currently serves as concertmaster for Rainier Symphony, and is affiliated with the Seattle Pacific University as violin instructor.

== Personal life ==
Talvi lives in Seattle, Washington and runs the Talvi Violin Studio along with his wife, Marjorie Kransberg-Talvi, a former concertmaster for the Pacific Northwest Ballet. His daughter, Silja, is a freelance journalist and Senior Editor for In These Times magazine.
