= Veikko Virtanen =

Finnish organ builder (1928–2026)

- Born: Veikko Armas Virtanen; 14 June 1928; Helsinki, Finland
- Died: 17 February 2026 (aged 97); Espoo, Finland
- Occupation: Organ builder

Veikko Armas Virtanen (14 June 1928 – 17 February 2026) was a Finnish organ builder.

His company, Urkurakentamo Veikko Virtanen OY, was based in Espoo and built organs for the Turku Cathedral, the Ristinkirkko, Lahti, and the Temppeliaukio Church.

Virtanen died on 17 February 2026, at the age of 97.
