= Tyyni Tuulio =

Finnish writer and translator

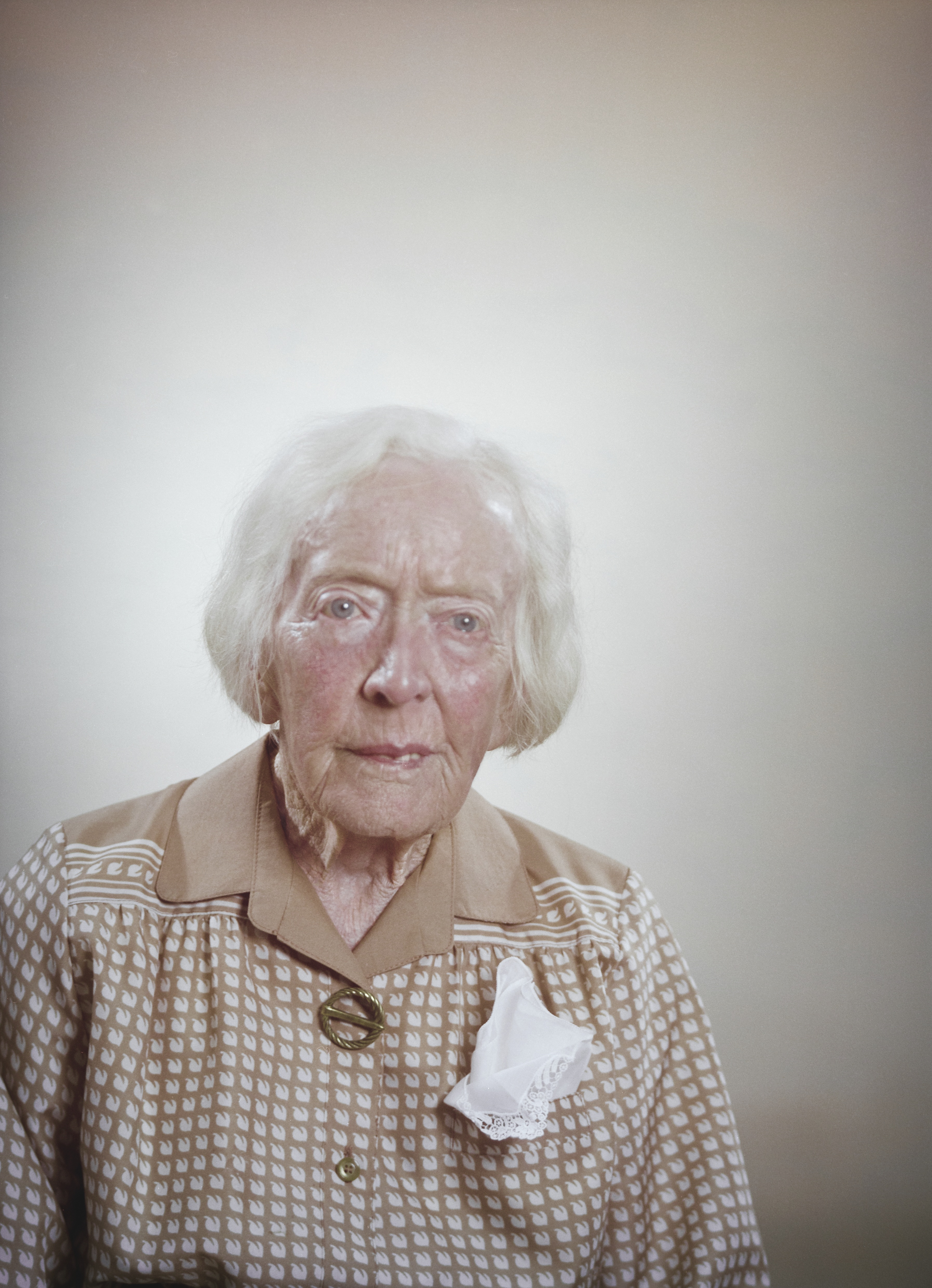
- Tuulio in 1982
- Born: Tyyni Maria Haapanen; 28 August 1892; Karvia, Finland
- Died: 9 June 1991 (aged 98); Helsinki, Finland
- Resting place: Hietaniemi Cemetery, Helsinki, Finland
- Education: University of Helsinki (BA, MA)
- Occupations: Biographer, translator, short story writer, essayist
- Spouse: Oiva Tuulio (m. 1917)
- Children: 3
- Relatives: Toivo Haapanen (brother)
- Writing career
- Notable awards: Commander of the Order of the Lion of Finland; Order of the Star of Italian Solidarity; Finnish Cultural Foundation award (1957)

Tyyni Maria Tuulio (née Haapanen; 28 August 1892, in Karvia – 9 June 1991, in Helsinki), was a Finnish writer and translator.

Tuulio was the daughter of vicar Jaakko Haapanen and Hilma Antoinette Rikberg. She graduated from high school in 1911, earned her Bachelor of Arts in 1916 and her Master of Arts in 1927, both in Romance languages and literature. She published travel writing and short stories as well as biographies of prominent Finnish women, such as Sophie Mannerheim (1948), Ottilia Stenbäck (1950), Alexandra Gripenberg (1959) and Maila Talvio (two volumes, 1963–1965). She also wrote memoirs in three volumes (1966–1969). In 1979, she published a collection of essays titled Fredrikan Suomi about Fredrika Runeberg and the other women who belonged to Johan Ludvig Runeberg's social circle.

Tuulio is counted among Finland's most influential twentieth-century literary translators. She translated from Swedish (the collected works of Fredrika Runeberg), English (Charlotte Brontë, Louisa May Alcott) and the Romance languages (Dante Alighieri's La Vita Nova).

In 1957, she received an award from the Finnish Cultural Foundation, and in 1960, she was awarded an honorary doctorate by the University of Helsinki. In 1985, she received the State translation prize.

She married linguist Oiva Tuulio in 1917. They had three sons; the eldest son was killed in the beginning of the Continuation War.

Tuulio's brother was conductor Toivo Haapanen. She is buried in the Hietaniemi Cemetery in Helsinki.
