= Uuno Klami =

Finnish composer (1900–1961)

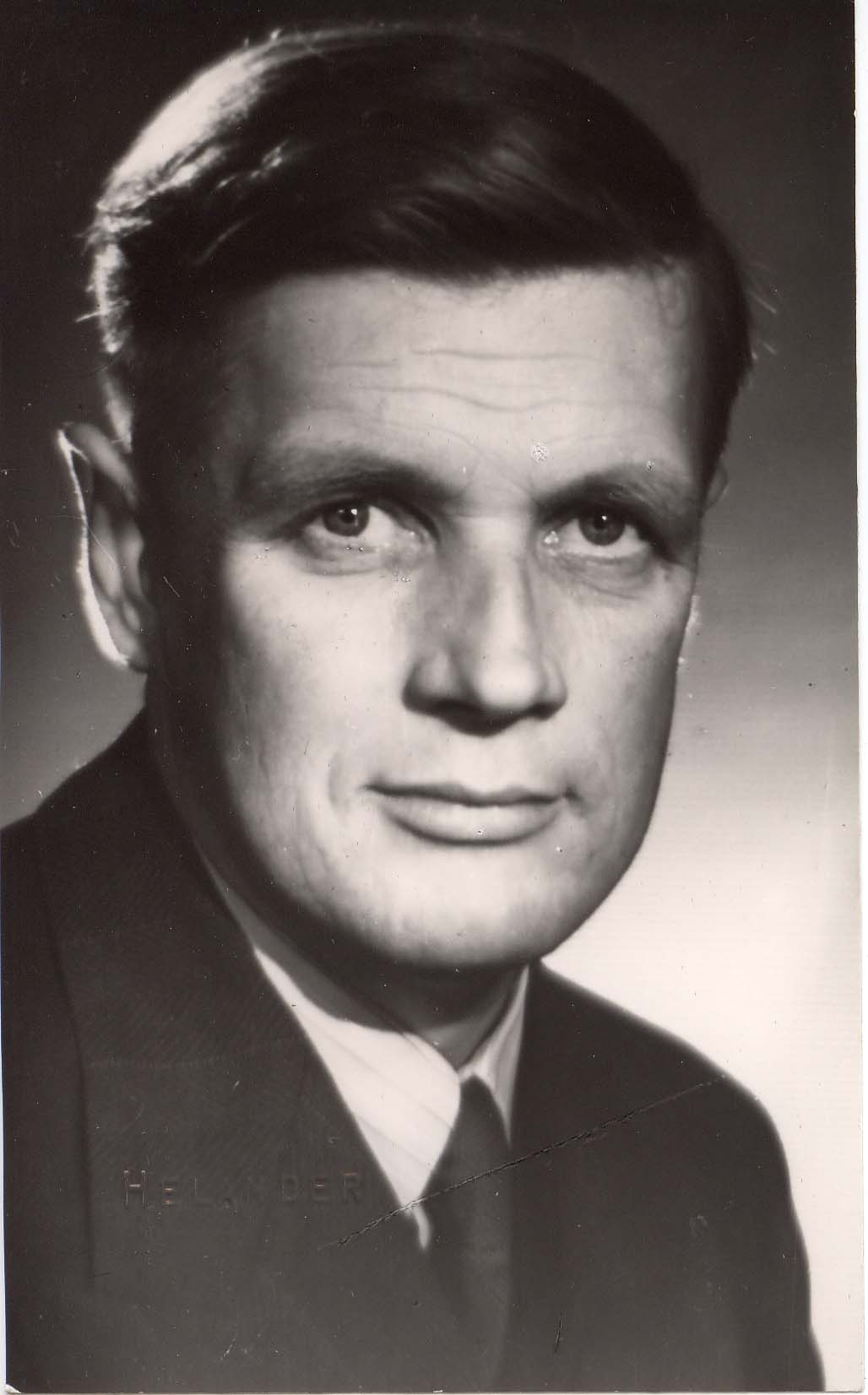
Klami c. 1930

Uuno (Kalervo) Klami (20 September 1900 – 29 May 1961) was a Finnish composer. He is widely recognized as one of the most significant Finnish composers to emerge from the generation that followed Jean Sibelius.

Klami was born and died in Virolahti. Many of his works are related to the epic Kalevala. He was influenced by French and Spanish music, and especially by Maurice Ravel, for whom he had a particular esteem.

The core of Klami's oeuvre consists of an assortment of works related to the Finnish national epic, the Kalevala, among the most notable being: the five-movement Kalevala sarja (Kalevala Suite; 1933, revised 1943), inspired by Stravinsky's The Rite of Spring; the symphonic poem, Lemminkäisen seikkailut saaressa (Lemminkäinen's Island Adventures; 1934); and, the unfinished ballet, Pyörteitä (Whirls), which survives as two suites. As central to Klami's legacy is the six-movement orchestral suite, Merikuvia (Sea Pictures; 1932); the Karelian Rhapsody (1927); and, Psalmus (1936), an oratorio for soloists, mixed, chorus and orchestra. He also wrote two numbered symphonies, in 1938 and 1945, respectively, as well as two piano concerti (1925, 1950), a violin concerto (1943), and the Cheremissian Fantasy for cello and orchestra (1931).

He participated in six armed conflicts, including two wars in Karelia, the Finnish Civil War, the Estonian War of Independence, the Winter War of 1939–40 and the Continuation War of 1941–44.

== Biography ==
Klami's parents were Anton Klami, who died of pulmonary tuberculosis when Uuno was four years old, and Amalia Korpela. Klami taught himself to play the violin and organ harmonium at home. He was admitted to the Helsingfors musikinstitut ("Helsinki Music Institute") in the autumn of 1915 at the age of 14, just before his 15th birthday, and his mother moved with him to Helsinki. His mother died of pulmonary tuberculosis in 1916. He married Toini Eeva Nykänen in 1932.

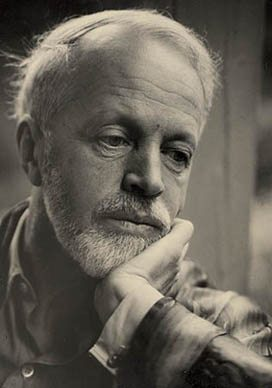
The Finnish composer Erkki Melartin, under whom Klami studied at the Helsinki Music Institute in 1920

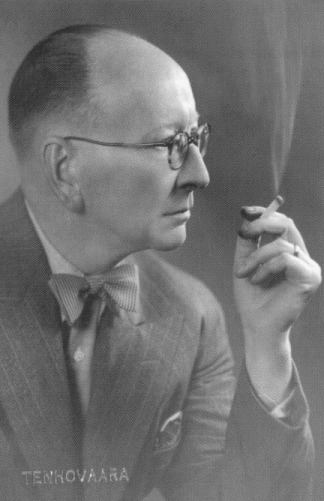
The Finnish conductor Toivo Haapanen conducted the second (1931), third (1943), and fourth (1946) of Klami's composition concerts.

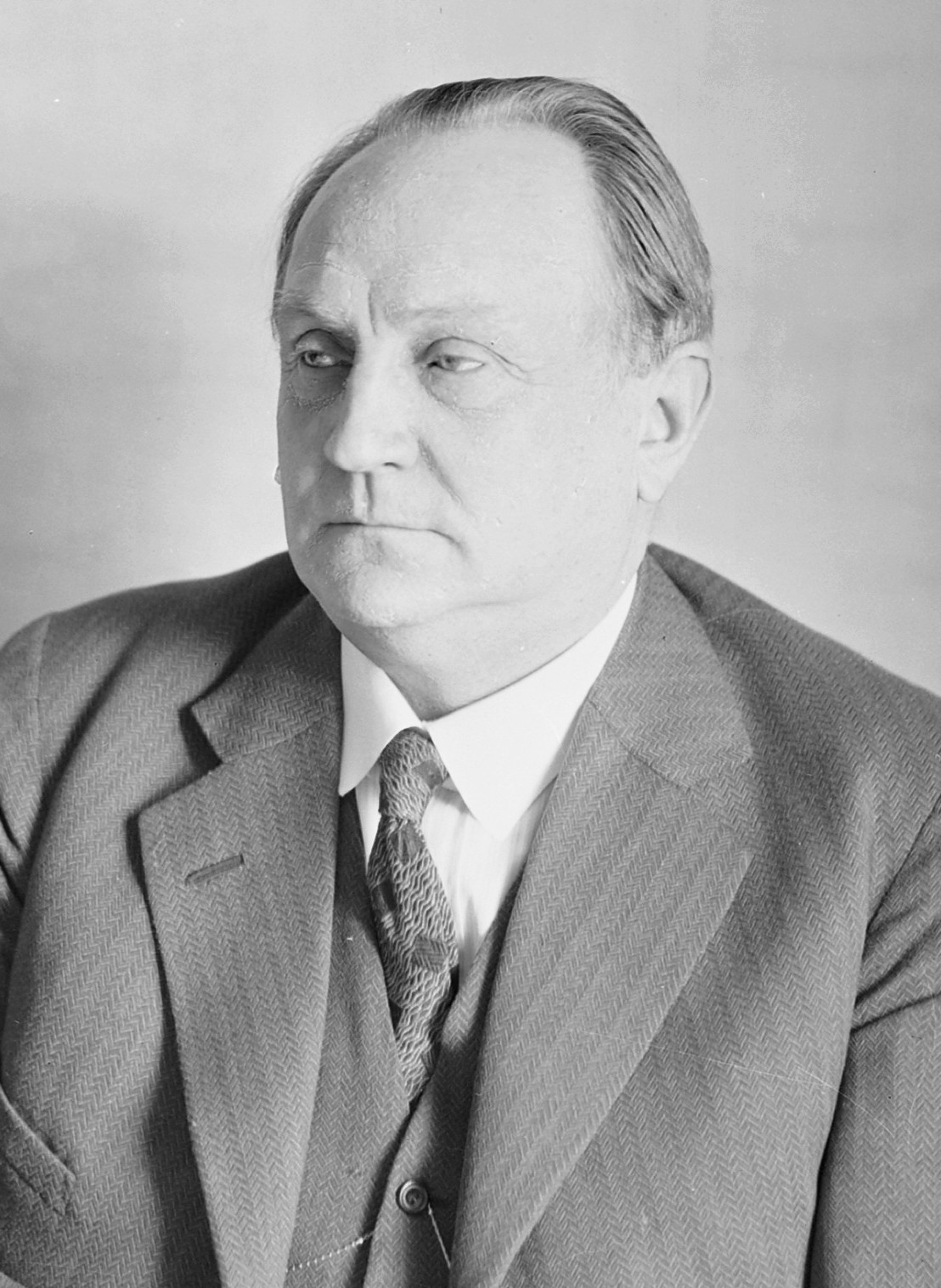
The Finnish conductor Georg Schnéevoigt premiered many of Klami's works, including his most famous: the initial four-movement version of the Kalevala Suite.

Klami studied music in Helsinki with Erkki Melartin and later in Paris and Vienna. Klami's Karelian Rhapsody, part of his first composition concert in 1928, was a succès de scandale that brought him considerable attention. His main works include the Kalevala Suite and the unfinished ballet Whirls. The oratorio Psalmus (1936) has a unique place in Finnish sacred music and is one of the most highly regarded works by a Finn other than Jean Sibelius. Klami also experimented with the symphonic form in his two symphonies (1938 and 1945) and Symphonie enfantine (1927), and the concerto form in his two piano concertos (No. 1 Une nuit à Montmartre and No. 2 for piano and string orchestra) and a violin concerto (1943). Being a master of miniature orchestral works, the orchestral suite Sea Pictures is also regarded as one of his major achievements. On the recommendation of Sibelius he was granted a small lifetime income from the government. In 1959 he was made a member of the Finnish Academy of Science and Letters (one of Finland's highest honors).

Klami died of a heart attack in Virolahti at age 60 while sailing his favorite boat Miina.

== Legacy ==
=== Reception and recordings ===
Acclaimed during his lifetime, Klami is today seldom heard outside the Nordic countries, the Kalevala Suite perhaps excepted.

The recording boom in the 1990s saw all of Klami's major works made available to the public, albeit often in only one interpretation per composition.

Despite these projects, much of Klami's oeuvre remains unrecorded (and unpublished), and he has received considerably less attention from record labels relative to fellow Finnish composers such as Leevi Madetoja, Aulis Sallinen, and Joonas Kokkonen.

=== Memorials ===
Founded in 1987, the Helsinki-based Uuno Klami Society exists to recognize the composer and to promote the publication, academic study, and performance of his music. At its first general meeting on 16 May 1988, the musicologist Helena Tyrväinen was elected chair; she held this post for 22 years until 2010. In addition, every five years, the Kymi Sinfonietta and the cities of Kotka and Kouvola (each located in the Kymenlaakso region of southern Finland in which Klami was born) co-host the International Uuno Klami Composition Competition, the goal of which is to increase international recognition of Klami and his music while expanding the repertoire of contemporary European works for a sinfonietta-sized orchestra. The inaugural event was held 2003–04, with subsequent iterations in 2008–09 (II), 2013–14 (III), and 2018–19 (IV). The Kymi Sinfonietta performs short-listed compositions at a finals concert and a jury (chaired by the Finnish composer Kalevi Aho) awards the three main prizes. There is also an audience prize and awards by the participating municipalities.

== Honors and titles ==
- 1925: Diploma, Helsinki Music Institute (now Sibelius Academy)
- 1927: Composition prize of 3,000 marks, Hjalmar Pesonen Fund
- 1928: Grant of 10,000 marks, Alfred Kordelin Foundation
- 1929: Grant of 10,000 marks, Kordelin Foundation
- 1929–32: Music teacher, Folk Conservatory
- 1930: Music critic, Iltalehti and Ajan sana
- 1931: Music critic, Uusi Suomi
- 1932–59: Music critic, Helsingin Sanomat
- 1932: Grant of 8,000, Kordelin Foundation
- 1933: Grant of 12,000, Kordelin Foundation
- 1938: Associate member, the Kalevala Society
- 1939–43: Annual State grant of 12,000 marks per year
- 1944: Grant of 150,000 marks, Finnish Cultural Foundation
- 1945–47: Member, Society of Finnish Composers
- 1946: Grant of 50,000 marks, Society of Finnish Composers' Sibelius Fund
- 1949: Founding member, Finnish Contemporary Music Society
- 1950: Grant of 100,000 marks, Sibelius Fund
- 1952: Grant of 100,000 marks, Sibelius Fund
- 1957: Member, Finnish delegation to the Second Assembly of the Composers' Union of the USSR
- 1958–61: Member of the board of the Society of Finnish Composers
- 1959–61: Member, Academy of Finland
- 1961: First vice-chairman, Kalevala Society

== Select list of compositions ==
=== Symphonies ===
- Symphonie enfantine (Children's Symphony), for chamber orchestra, Op. 17 (1928); three movements
- Symphony No. 1, for orchestra (1937–38); four movements
- Symphony No. 2, for orchestra, Op. 35 (1945); four movements

=== Concertante ===
- Piano Concerto No. 1, Une nuit à Montmartre (Night in Montmartre), for piano and orchestra, Op. 8 (1925); three movements (Note: The French subtitle comes not from Klami, but rather from the Finnish composer Ernest Pingoud.)
- Tšeremissiläinen fantasia (Cheremissian Fantasy), for cello and orchestra, Op. 19 (1931); two movements
- Introduction e Staccato etude, for trumpet and chamber orchestra (1931–32)
- Esquisse, for violin and strings (1932)
- Intermezzo, for cor anglais and chamber orchestra (1937)
- Violin Concerto, for violin and orchestra, Op. 32 (1939–43; rewritten 1954); three movements (Note: The original version of the Violin Concerto (1943) was lost in Stockholm in 1944, prompting Klami to rewrite the piece in 1954. According to Heikki Poroila, the two versions are so different from each other that they "should be treated as independent works" ("Versiot ovat niin erilaisia, että niitä on syytä käsitellä itsenäisinä teoksi-na"). In 1957, the 1943 version of the concerto was found in the archives of the Swedish Broadcasting Corporation.)
- Piano Concerto No. 2, for piano and strings, Op. 41 (1950); three movements
- Tema con sette variazioni e coda (Theme with Seven Variations and Coda), for cello and orchestra, Op. 44 (1953–54)

=== Music for stage ===
- Intohimot jalavien varjossa (Desire Under the Elms), incidental music for clarinet, trumpet, violin, and piano (1930) for the 1924 play by Eugene O'Neill
  - Arranged in 1931 by Klami as Rag-time and Blues, a quintet for the above instruments plus an additional violin
- Tuhlaripoika (The Prodigal Son), incidental music for male voice, choir, flute, clarinet, piano and strings (1945); play by Marin Držić (translation to Finnish by Jalo Kalima)
- Pyörteitä (Whirls), unfinished ballet ("symbolic dance scenes") in three acts based on the Sampo legend from the Kalevala (1957–61):
  - Act 1 survives as a piano score by Klami (1958; orchestral score believed lost); it was orchestrated by the Finnish composer Kalevi Aho in the late 1980s and premiered in 1988.
  - Act 2 (intended as a divertissement) is the only of the three acts that survives in Klami's orchestration; in 1960, he excerpted two ballet suites.
  - Act 3 is either lost or was never written

=== Voice and orchestra ===
- Psalmus, oratorio in two parts for soprano, baritone, mixed choir, organ, and orchestra (1932–36); text by Juhana Cajanus
- Vipusessa käynti (In the Belly of Vipunen), symphonic poem for baritone, male choir, and orchestra (1938); text from the Kalevala
- Laulu Kuujärvestä (Song of Lake Kuujärvi), ballad for baritone and orchestra (1956); text by Yrjö Jylhä
- Kultasauvallinen (The Bearer of the Golden Staff), cantata in four parts for soprano, baritone, mixed choir, and orchestra (1960–61); text by Martti Haavio

=== Suites for orchestra ===
- Kohtauksia nukketeatterista (Scenes from a Puppet Theatre), suite for chamber orchestra (orchestrated in 1931; the original 1925 theatre score for two pianos is lost); five movements
- Hommage à Haendel (Homage to Handel), suite for piano and strings, Op. 21 (1931); four movements
- Kuvia maalaiselämästä (Scenes from a Country Life), suite for chamber orchestra (1932); six movements
- Merikuvia (Sea Pictures), suite for orchestra (1930–32); six movements
- Kalevala-sarja (Kalevala Suite), five tone pictures for orchestra, Op. 23 (1930–33; No. 3 added in 1943); based on stories from the Kalevala; five (originally four) movements
- Sarja jousiorkesterille (Suite for String Orchestra) (1937); four movements
- Sarja pienelle orkesterille (Suite for Small Orchestra), Op. 37 (1946); three movements

=== Other works for orchestra ===
- Karjalainen rapsodia (Karelian Rhapsody), for orchestra, Op. 15 (1927)
- Opernredoute, concert waltz for orchestra, Op. 20 (1929)
- Sérénades joyeuses (Joyful Serenades), for chamber orchestra (1933); four movements
- Helsinki March (1934)
- Lemminkäisen seikkailut saaressa (Lemminkäinen's Island Adventures), symphonic poem for orchestra (1934); based on the Kalevala; Klami's first attempt at composing a central scherzo for the Kalevala Suite, later removed and made an independent work
- Karjalaisia tansseja (Karelian Dances), for chamber orchestra (1935)
- Nummisuutarit (The Cobbler on the Heath), concert overture for orchestra (1936); based on the play by Aleksis Kivi
- Suomenlinna, concert overture for orchestra, Op. 30 (1939–40; rewritten 1944); inspired by the Suomenlinna islands; later renamed Linna meren äärellä (The Fortress on the Sea) (Note: The original version of the Suomenlinna overture (1940) was lost in Germany during World War II, prompting Klami to rewrite the piece in 1944 based on his original sketches.)
- Sérénades espagnoles (Spanish Serenades), for chamber orchestra (1944); four movements
- Kuningas Lear (King Lear), concert overture for orchestra, Op. 33 (1944–45); unrelated to the stage music (chamber ensemble, 1936–37) of the same name
- Pyöräilijä (The Cyclist), rondo for orchestra (1946)
- Karjalainen tori (A Karelian Market), for orchestra, Op. 39 (1947)
- Revontulet (Aurore boréale or Northern Lights), fantasy for orchestra, Op. 38 (1946–48); inspired by the natural light display
- All'ouvertura, concert overture for orchestra, Op. 43 (1951)

=== Chamber ===
- Sonata in B♭ minor, for viola and piano, Op. 6 (1920)

== Notes, references, and sources ==
=== Sources ===
- Poroila, Heikki (2012). Yhtenäistetty Uuno Klami [List of Works by Uuno Klami]. Helsinki: Suomen musiikkikirjastoyhdistys (Finnish Music Library Association). ISBN 978-952-5363-30-2.
- Tyrväinen, Helena (2001). "Klami, Uuno (Kalervo)". Grove Music Online (8th ed.). Oxford University Press. doi:10.1093/gmo/9781561592630.article.15092. ISBN 978-1-56159-263-0. (subscription, Wikilibrary access, or UK public library membership required) (subscription required)

=== Cited liner notes ===
- Aho, Kalevi (1997a). Uuno Klami: Whirls, Act 1 / Violin Concerto / Suomenlinna (CD booklet). Osmo Vänskä and Lahti Symphony Orchestra. BIS Records. OCLC 40569371. CD–696.
- Aho, Kalevi (1997b). Uuno Klami: Symphonie enfantine / Hommage à Haendel / Suite for Strings / Suite for Small Orchestra (CD booklet). Jean-Jacques Kantorow and Tapiola Sinfonietta. BIS Records. OCLC 39797823. CD–806.
- Salmenhaara, Erkki (1994). Uuno Klami: Whirls, Ballet: Suites 1 & 2 / Lemminkäinen's Island Adventures / Song of Lake Kuujärvi (CD booklet). Osmo Vänskä and Lahti Symphony Orchestra. BIS. OCLC 31799770. CD–656.
- Tyrväinen, Helena (1994). Uuno Klami: The Cobblers on the Heath, overture / Theme with Seven Variations and Coda / Kalevala Suite (CD booklet). Osmo Vänskä and Lahti Symphony Orchestra. BIS Records. OCLC 32530002. CD–676.
- Tyrväinen, Helena (1995). Uuno Klami: Symphony No. 1 / King Lear Ouverture (CD booklet). Tuomas Ollila-Hannikainen and Tampere Philharmonic Orchestra. Ondine. OCLC 36076621. ODE854-2.
- Tyrväinen, Helena (1996). Uuno Klami: Symphony No. 2 / Symphonie enfantine (CD booklet). Tuomas Ollila-Hannikainen and Tampere Philharmonic Orchestra. Ondine. OCLC 36076789. ODE858-2.
