= Karvia Church =

Church in Karvia, Finland

Coordinates: 62°08′06″N 22°33′39″E

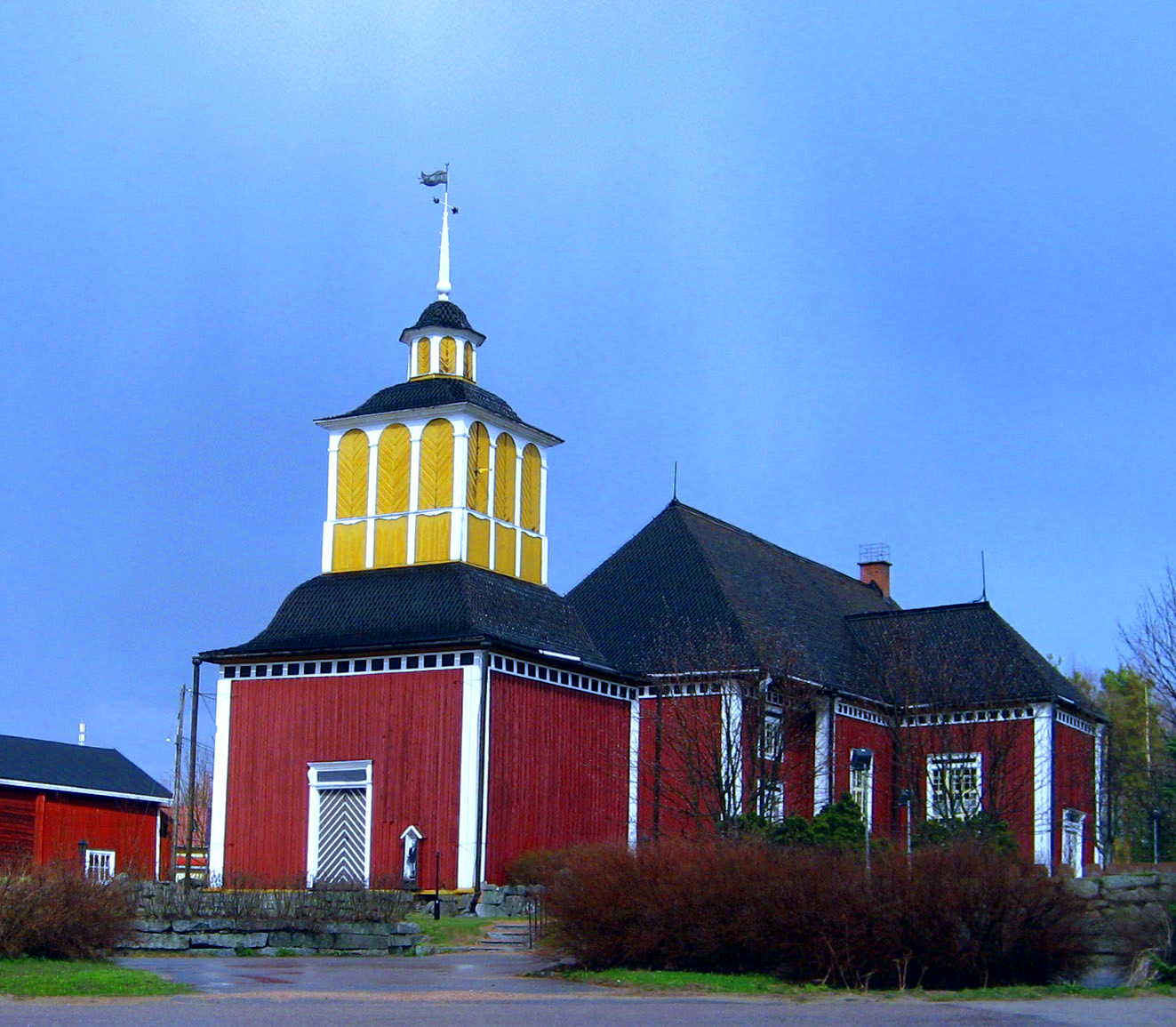
The church of Karvia

Karvia Church is a wooden church in Karvia, Finland. It was built in 1789-1798 by Salomon Köhlström. The bell tower which is located in front of the church was completed 1806. The church has been extended and renovated several times in the course of the years.

The ‘street church’ hosts an altarpiece by Carl Gabriel Diederichs.

== See also ==
Karvia Church, official website
