= Birger Carlstedt =

Finnish artist (1907–1975)

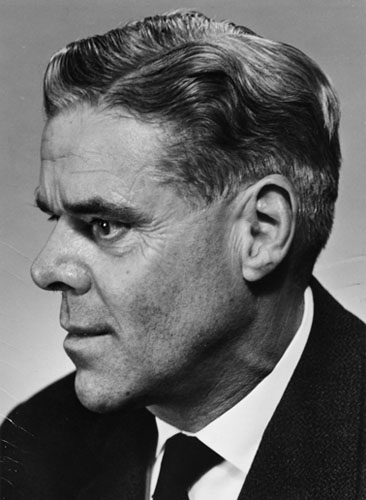
- Carlstedt in 1960
- Born: John Birger Jarl Carlstedt; 12 July 1907; Helsinki, Finland
- Died: 3 October 1975 (aged 68); Helsinki, Finland
- Citizenship: Finnish
- Occupations: Artist, designer
- Spouses: Ingegärd Jacquette af Forselles (m. 1932–33); Inga Hjördis Beatrice Roos (m. 1941–49); France Ellegaard (m. 1941–75, his death)
- Writing career
- Language: Swedish
- Notable works: Le Chat Doré cafe, interior design, Helsinki 1929; Horror, painting 1929
- Notable awards: Pro Finlandia Medal, 1964

John Birger Jarl Carlstedt (12 July 1907 in Helsinki – 3 October 1975 in Helsinki) was a Finnish painter and a pioneer of Modern Art in Finland. His painting style went through various changes, with influences from Impressionism, Expressionism, Futurism and abstract art.

== Biography ==
Birger Carlstedt was born in Helsinki to businessman John Wilhelm Carlstedt and restaurateur Amanda Josefina Lindström. Carlstedt had an older sibling who died as a child and a younger brother, Knut Wilhelm. The two brothers are said to have been close. Knut was born in 1910 and died in the Winter war.

The family was a part of the Swedish-speaking influential minority of Finland, but French and German were also spoken in the household. Birger Carlstedt also learned Finnish in school. The family was affluent, and Birger grew up in a household with valets. After John passed in 1913, Amanda continued to acquire and run restaurants in Helsinki until 1938.

Birger Carlstedt studied at the School of the Fine Arts Association of Finland and the Central School of Applied Arts in Helsinki. He also studied in Paris during the 1920s and 1930s. With the support of rich parents, Carlstedt was able to travel around Europe and visit the Bauhaus and De Stijl groups to study their visual arts and architecture. Amanda Carlstedt was her son's paton for much of his life.

As a student, Carlstedt already belonged to the relatively small group of artists who were constantly open to new influences and experimented with new forms of expression. He was influenced by Cubism and Surrealism and his style became increasingly Non-figurative.

While working as a painter after his studies, he also had his own interior design company. His most notable interior design was the Le Chat Doré cafe in Helsinki (1929), which was Parisian in style, with references to Art Deco. The café was run by Carlstedt's mother Amanda.

Carlstedt drew inspiration from the café L’ Aubette in Strasbourg, which was styled by Theo van Doesburg, Jean (Hans) Arp and Sophie Taeuber-Arp in 1926–1928. At that time this type of interior design was not understood or appreciated in Finland, so when the lease of the café was up in 1933, the interior was destroyed.

2019 Reconstruction of Carlstedt's Le Chat Doré cafe, Helsinki, 1929

Birger Carlstedt's first major exhibition was in the Kunsthalle Helsinki in 1932. The exhibition was also subject to harsh criticism, because international abstract art was not appreciated.

Carlstedt was married three times: first to Ingegärd Jacquette af Forselles in 1932; then to Inga Hjördis Beatrice Roos in 1941 and finally to the pianist France Ellegaard in 1949.

In 2019-20 a major retrospective exhibition of Carlstedt's works was held in the Amos Rex Museum in Helsinki. As part of the exhibition, the museum reconstructed part of the interior of the Le Chat Doré cafe of 1929.
