= Filip von Schantz =

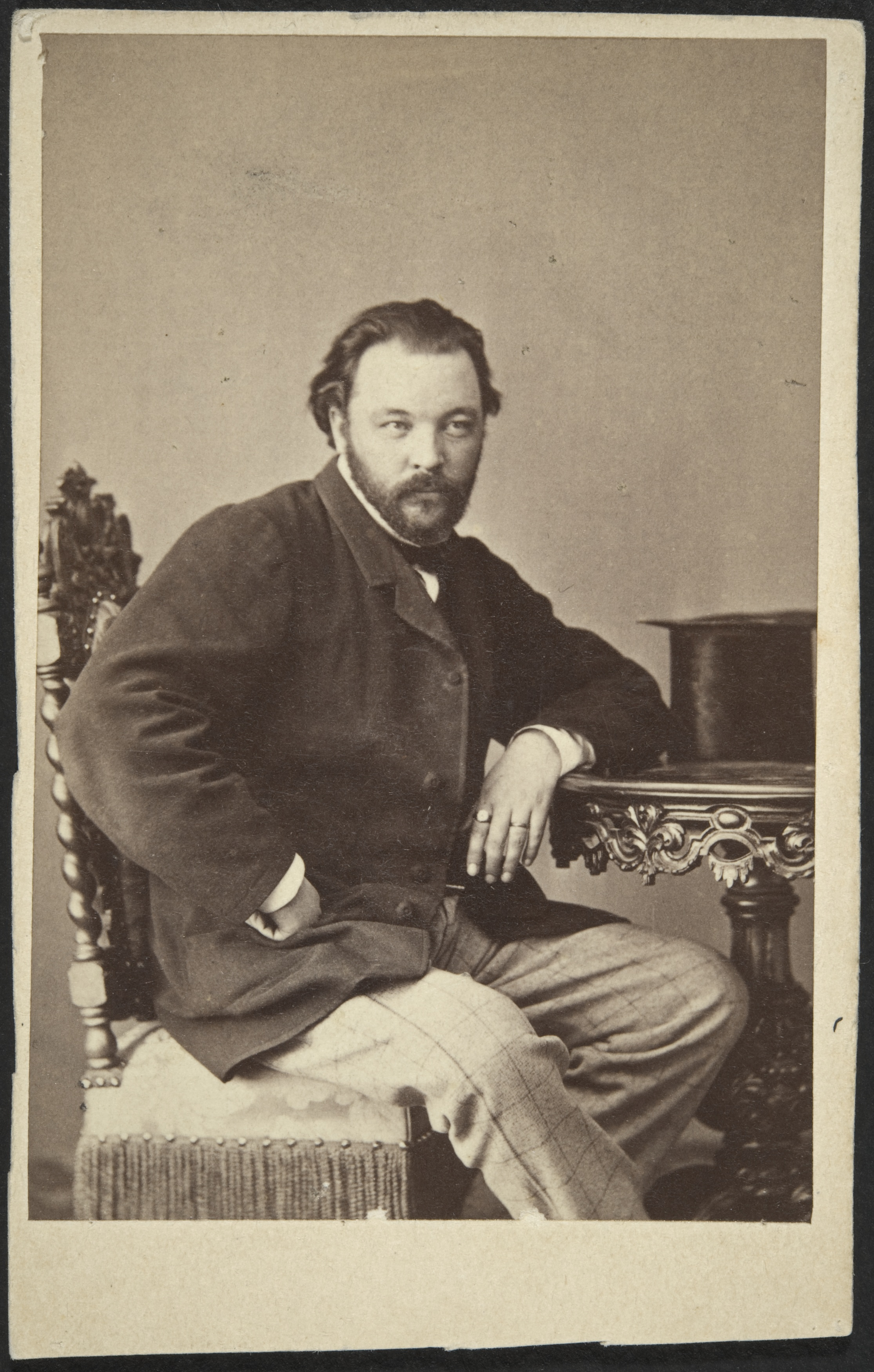
Filip von Schantz

John Filip von Schantz (17 January 1835 – 24 July 1865) was a Finnish composer and musician. Born in Ulvila, he left Helsinki in 1855 after being expelled from University of Helsinki, deciding to devote himself to music. The following year he began studies in violin and composition in Stockholm and continued them at Leipzig in Germany in 1857–1860.

In 1860 he was employed as conductor at the Swedish Theatre in Helsinki. When the Swedish Theatre burned down in 1863 he began performing at Berns Salonger in Stockholm, Sweden. He also performed in Gothenburg, Sweden, and Copenhagen, Denmark, before falling ill and returning to Finland in 1864. He died in Helsinki.
