= Symphony No. 2 (Klami) =

Symphony in four movements by Uuno Klami

- by Uuno Klami
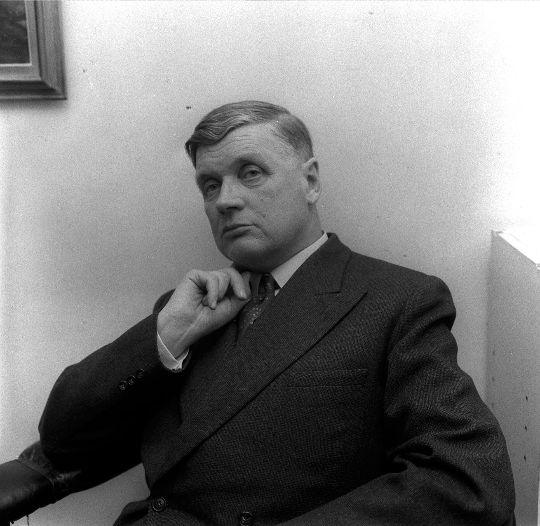
- The composer in 1959
- Opus: 35
- Composed: 1945
- Duration: Approx. 35 minutes
- Movements: 4

Premiere
- Date: 15 December 1946
- Location: Helsinki, Finland
- Conductor: Toivo Haapanen
- Performers: Helsinki Philharmonic Orchestra

The Symphony No. 2 is a four-movement orchestral composition by the Finnish composer Uuno Klami, who wrote the piece in 1945; it is the final of Klami's two numbered symphonies. Toivo Haapanen and the Helsinki Philharmonic Orchestra premiered the work at the Helsinki Conservatory on 15 December 1946.

== Orchestration ==
The Second Symphony is scored for the following instruments: ( Score)

- Woodwind: piccolo, 3 flutes, 2 oboes, 2 clarinets, 2 bassoons, and contrabassoon
- Brass: 4 horns, 4 trumpets, 3 trombones, and tuba
- Percussion: timpani, bass drum, snare drum, and cymbals
- Strings: violins, violas, cellos, and double basses

== Structure ==
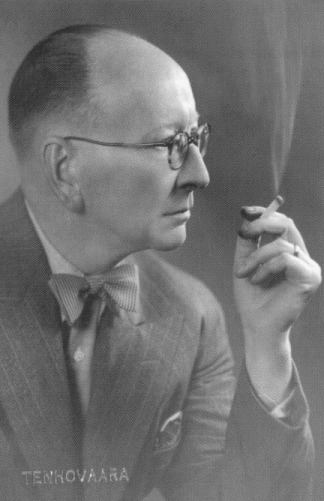
The Finnish conductor Toivo Haapanen conducted the premiere of the Second Symphony in 1946.

The Second Symphony is in four movements. They are as follows:

1. Moderato molto
2. Allegro con vivo
3. (En forme d'introduction) Misterioso e lugubre, tempo quasi adagio
4. Allegro assai

== Discography ==
The sortable table below lists the only commercially available recording of the Second Symphony:

Conductor	Orchestra	Year	Runtime	Venue	Label	Ref.						
Conductor	Orchestra	Year	Runtime	Venue	Label	Ref.	Tuomas Ollila-Hannikainen	Tampere Philharmonic Orchestra	1995	35:40	Tampere Hall	Ondine (ODE 858–2)

== References and sources ==
=== Sources ===
- Poroila, Heikki (2012). Yhtenäistetty Uuno Klami (List of Works by Uuno Klami). Helsinki: Suomen musiikkikirjastoyhdistys (Finnish Music Library Association). ISBN 978-952-5363-30-2.
- Tyrväinen, Helena (1996). Uuno Klami: Symphony No. 2 / Symphonie enfantine (CD booklet). Tuomas Ollila-Hannikainen & Tampere Philharmonic Orchestra. Ondine. ODE 858-2. OCLC 36076789
- "Uuno Klami: Years, Compositions: 1940–1961". uunoklami.fi/en. The Uuno Klami Society. 2009.
