= France Ellegaard =

Finnish musician and pianist (1913–1999)

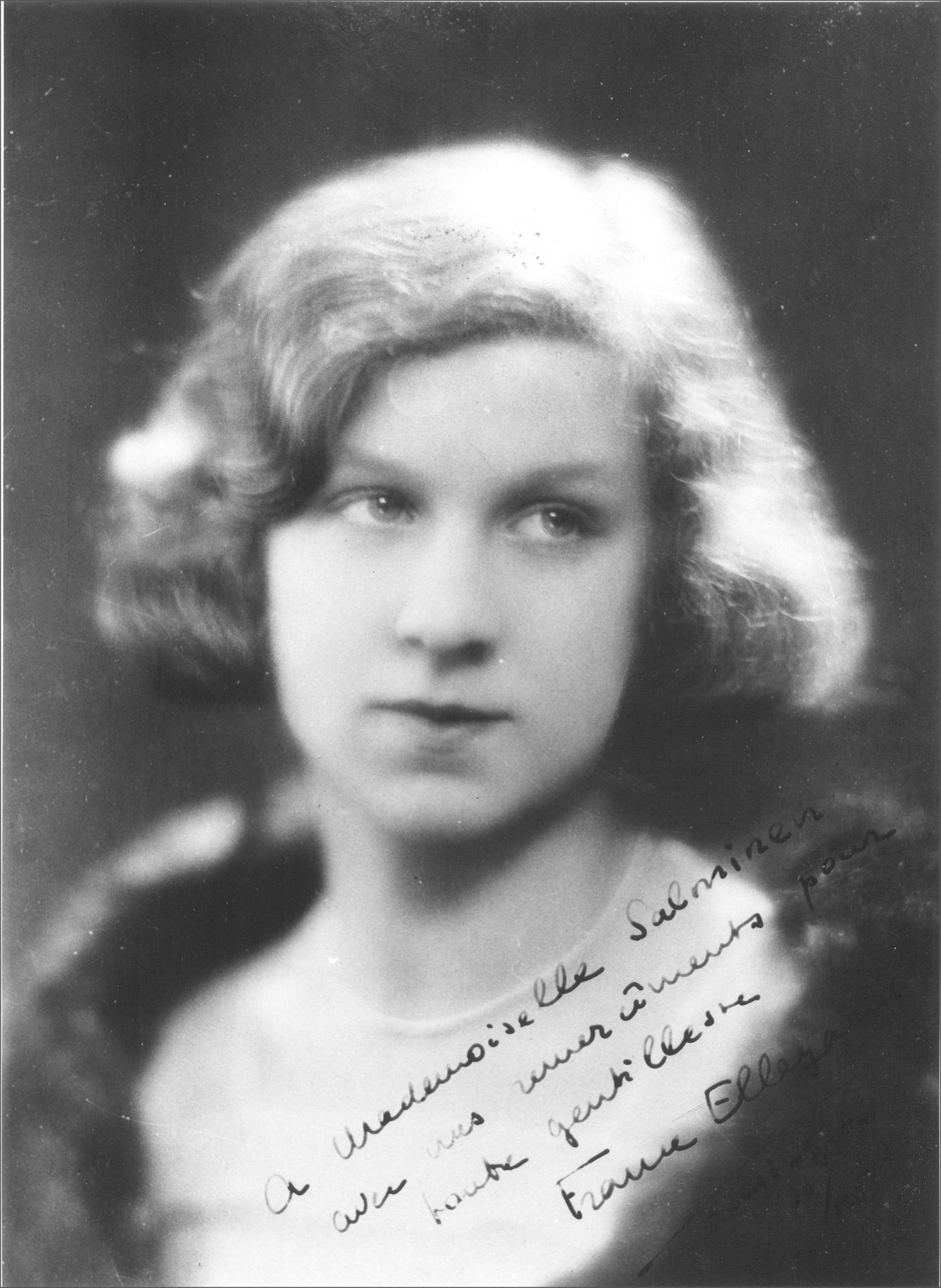
France Ellegaard in 1934.

France Marguerite Ellegaard (10 October 1913 – 17 April 1999) was a Finnish pianist and music educator, born in France to Danish parents. She was considered one of the 20th century's great concert pianists.

The daughter of cyclist Thorvald Ellegaard and Karen Kirstine Nicolaysen, she was born in Paris. Ellegaard studied at the Paris Conservatory and gave her first Danish performance in Copenhagen in 1927. She performed throughout Scandinavia and in the music capitals of Europe. Following the German invasion of Denmark in 1940, she remained in Denmark and then, in 1943, went to Sweden as a political refugee. She married Finnish painter Birger Carlstedt in 1949 and became a Finnish citizen. From 1961 to 1965, she performed in a trio with Anja Ignatius and Pentti Rautawaara.

Ellegaard received a medal from the French Academic Society of Letters, Arts and Sciences in 1933. She received the Danish Tagea Brandt Rejselegat (travel scholarship) in 1936.

From 1969 to 1975, Ellegaard taught piano at the Sibelius Academy.

She died at Espoo in Finland.
