= Oiva Tuulio =

Finnish linguist

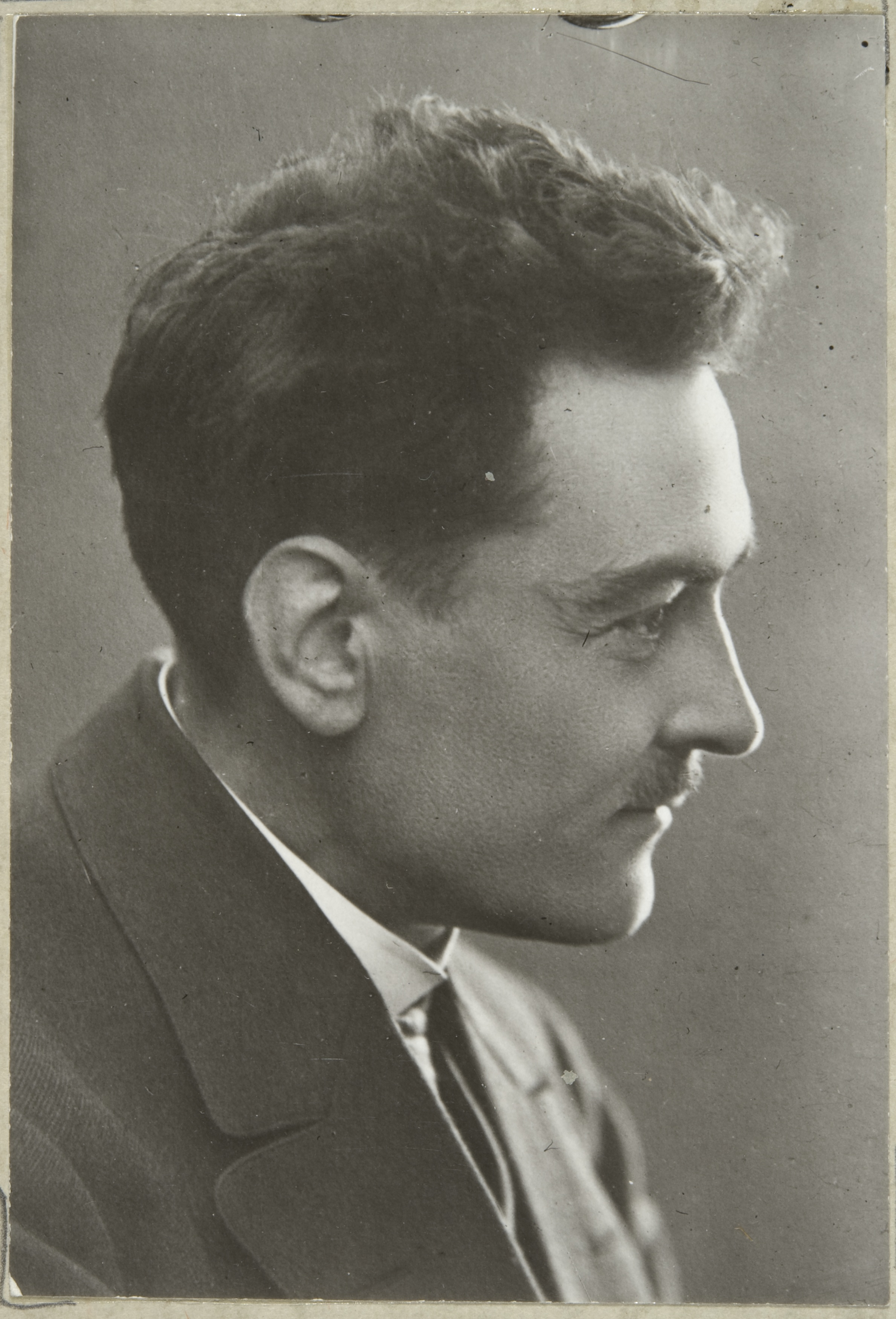
Oiva Tuulio in the early 1920s.

Oiva Johannes Tuulio (17 January 1878, Pyhäjärvi – 21 June 1941, Helsinki) was a Finnish linguist specializing in the Romance languages. He bore the surname Tallgren until 1933.

Tuulio was son to provost Ivar Markus Tallgren and Jenny Maria Montin. He earned his PhD in 1907, was awarded the title of docent in 1910 and served as extraordinary professor of the Southern Romance languages at the University of Helsinki from 1928 to 1941. Before accepting the professorship, he had refused offers from the universities of Tartu and Riga. He made study trips to Paris 1901–1902 and to Southern Europe 1903–1904, 1907–1908, 1926 and 1931.

Tuulio pioneered the field of Spanish research in Finland; his PhD thesis, Estudios sobre la Gaya de Segovia (1907), was the first study about Spanish written in that language at the University of Helsinki. Tuulio had to obtain permission to write it in Spanish and the defense was held in French. He also studied the influence of Arabic on Spanish as well the status of Sicilian within the Romance family. His other interests included Vulgar Latin, Italian and French. Together with his brother, archaeologist Aarne Michaël Tallgren, he published Idrisi, la Finlande et les autres pays baltiques orientaux (1930), in which he attempted to show similarities between place names on the maps by Muhammad al-Idrisi and place names in Finland and the Baltics. He returned to this topic in his Du nouveau sur Idrisi (1936).

Tuulio made an impact as a popularizer of the Spanish language and culture in Finland, as he organized cultural events and produced works aimed at a general audience, such as travel writing about Spain.

He was appointed auxiliary member of the Finnish Academy of Science and Letters in 1910 and full member in 1925.

Oiva Tuulio was married to writer Tyyni Tuulio since 1917. They had three sons; the eldest son was killed in the beginning of the Continuation War. Tuulio succumbed to tuberculosis in 1941. He is buried in the Hietaniemi Cemetery in Helsinki.
