= Anja Ignatius =

Finnish violinist (1911–1995)

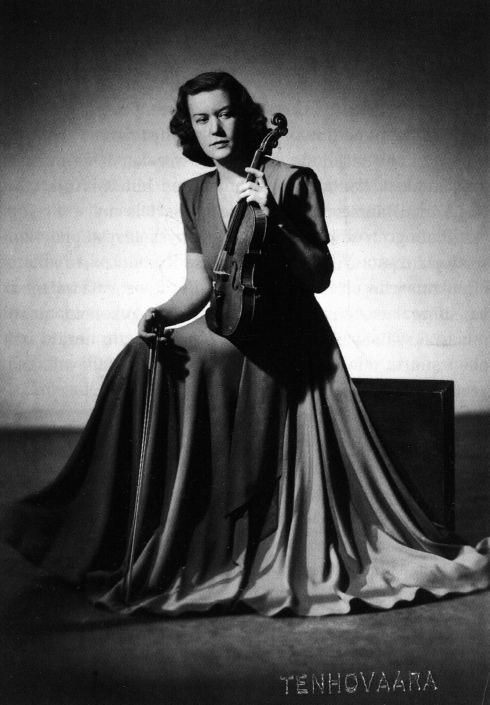

Background information
- Born: 2 July 1911; Tampere, Finland
- Died: 10 April 1995 (aged 83)
- Instrument: violin

Anja Ignatius (2 July 1911 – 10 April 1995) was a Finnish violinist and music educator, mainly known as a chamber musician.

She was born in Tampere, began studying violin at the age of five and gave her first concert at the age of fifteen. Ignatius studied in Finland, at the Paris Conservatory and in Prague. She performed with the Helsinki Philharmonic Orchestra in 1928. Between 1929 and 1931, she studied with Carl Flesch in Berlin. Besides concerts in Finland, Ignatius performed in Sweden, Norway, Denmark, Germany, Great Britain, France, Poland, the Soviet Union and the United States. She is best known for her interpretation of Sibelius' Violin Concerto. From 1953 to 1961, she played first violin with the Helsinki Quartet; from 1961 to 1965, she performed in a trio with France Ellegaard and Pentti Rautawaara.

In 1955, Ignatius became a professor teaching violin at the Sibelius Academy. She served on the juries for several national and international competitions.
