= Karvia =

- Municipality
- Karvian kunta Karvia kommun
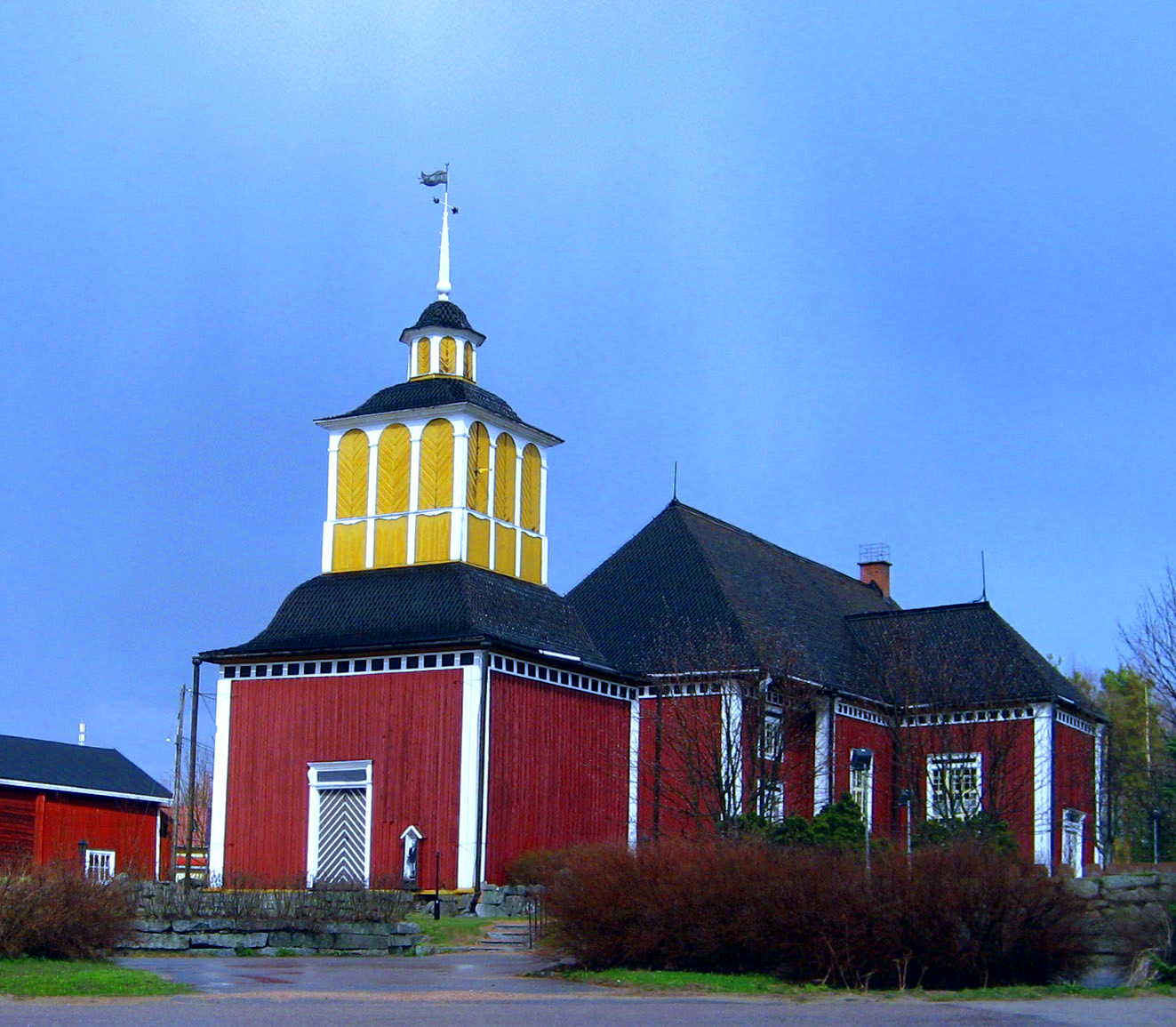
- Karvia Church.

- Coat of arms

- Location of Karvia in Finland
- Interactive map of Karvia
- Coordinates: 62°08′N 022°33.5′E
- Country: Finland
- Region: Satakunta
- Sub-region: Pohjois-Satakunta sub-region
- Charter: 1865

Government
  - Municipal manager: Tarja Hosiasluoma

Area (2018-01-01)
  - Total: 519.90 km^{2} (200.73 sq mi)
  - Land: 502.22 km^{2} (193.91 sq mi)
  - Water: 17.9 km^{2} (6.9 sq mi)
  - Rank: 175th largest in Finland

Population (2025-12-31)
  - Total: 2,133
  - Rank: 249th largest in Finland
  - Density: 4.25/km^{2} (11.0/sq mi)

Population by native language
  - Finnish: 94.3% (official)
  - Others: 5.7%

Population by age
  - 0 to 14: 12%
  - 15 to 64: 53.4%
  - 65 or older: 34.6%
- Time zone: UTC+02:00 (EET)
  - Summer (DST): UTC+03:00 (EEST)
- Climate: Dfc
- Website: karvia.fi

Karvia is a municipality of Finland founded in 1865.

Karvia is located in the province of Western Finland and is part of the Satakunta region. The population is 2,133 (31 December 2025) and the municipality covers an area of 502.22 km^{2} (193.91 sq mi) of which 17.90 km^{2} (6.91 sq mi) is inland water (1 January 2018). The population density is 4.25/km^{2} (11.0/sq mi).

Viru-Nigula in Estonia has been the twin town of Karvia since 1994.
