= Ristinkirkko, Lahti =

- Ristinkirkko
- Church of the Cross
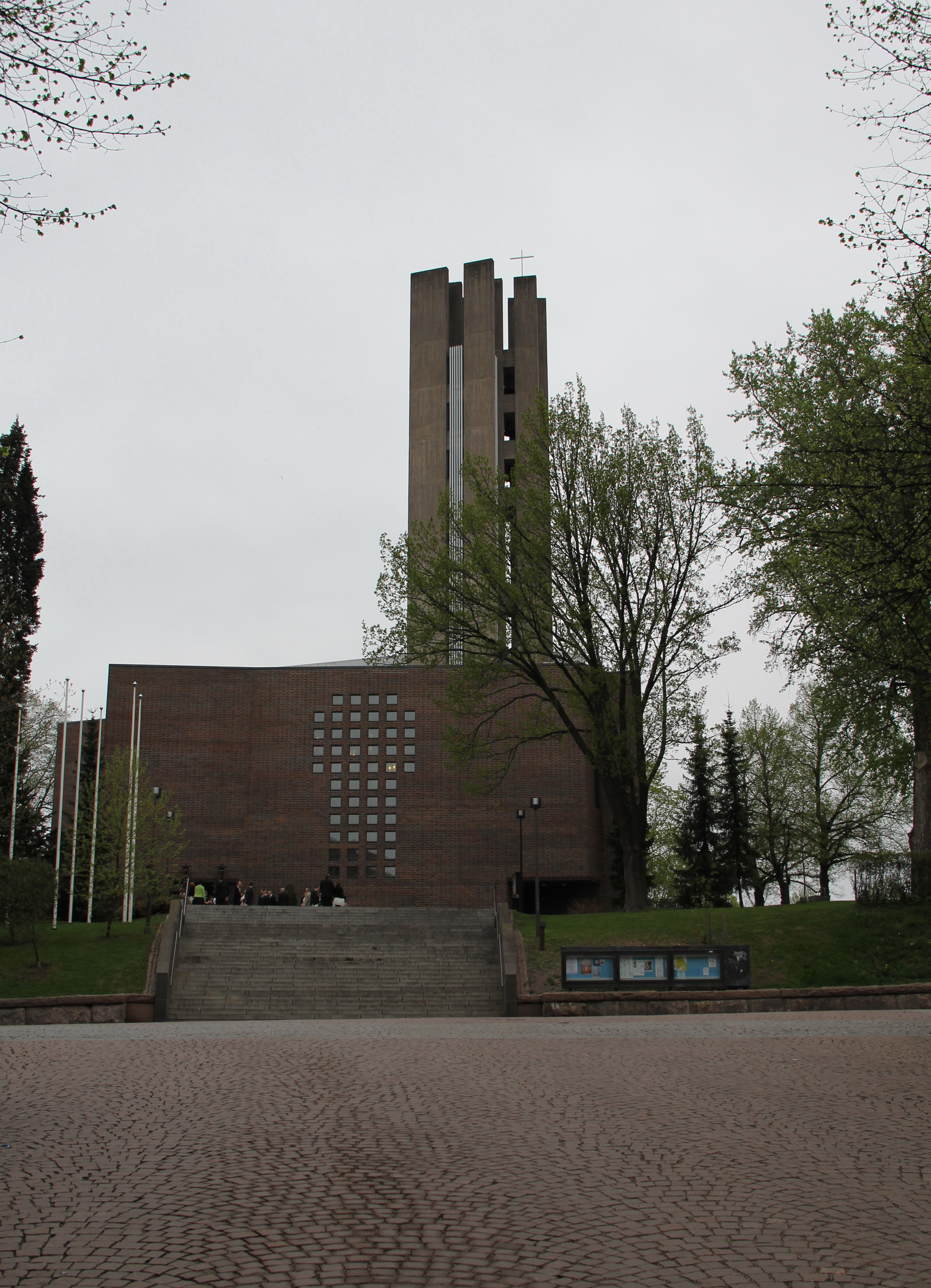
- Ristinkirkko viewed from the south
- Ristinkirkko, Lahti
- 60.985555°N 25.657241°E
- Location: Lahti
- Country: Finland
- Denomination: Lutheran

History
- Status: Parish church

Architecture
- Functional status: Active
- Architect: Alvar Aalto
- Architectural type: Modernism
- Completed: 1978

Specifications
- Capacity: 1,150

Administration
- Parish: Keski-Lahden seurakunta (Central Lahti parish)

Ristinkirkko (English: Church of the Cross) is the main church in Lahti, Finland. The modernist church, completed in 1978, was one of the last design projects of the renowned Finnish architect Alvar Aalto.

== Background ==
An earlier parish church in Lahti, built in 1890, was as long back as in the 1920s found to be too small, due to the town's rapid population growth from a few hundred in the 1880s to over 8,000 in the 1920s. Its appearance and timber construction were also considered too parochial, and unsuited to Lahti's new city status (chartered in 1905). Therefore, plans had been brewing since the 1930s for a new church to be built, although these had had to be put on hold for the war years.

In 1950, an architectural design contest was held for a new church, and was won by Aalto. However, the plan to demolish the old church and build a new modernist one sparked off a heated controversy which lasted almost two decades, and it wasn't until 1969 that the Lahti Parish had received green light and were in a position to commission a full architectural plan from Aalto. By this time the planned location for the church had also changed, necessitating changes to the earlier design.

The old church was demolished in 1977 to make way for the new build. Parts of the old church belfry were retained and housed in the new church, including the church bells, as well as two logs which were used by Aalto to create a simple altar cross. The roof-top cross from the old church is also now on display by the Ristinkirkko main entrance.

Alvar Aalto never saw the finished church. He died in May 1976, whereas the church was only completed two years later, consecrated during the Advent season of 1978. The final stages of the project were instead overseen by Aalto's wife, architect Elissa Aalto.

== Architecture ==
The overall feel of the design is minimalist and brutalist. The exterior of the church building is constructed mostly of red brick, with a massive cast concrete belfry rising from its roof to a height of 40 metres (130 ft) above the surrounding terrain.

In contrast, the interior is light, with white walls and large windows providing natural daylight.

The basic shape of the overall floorplan is an equilateral triangle, with two of the three points cut off, forming an irregular pentagon. Attached to one of the long sides is a wedge-shaped entrance vestibule, and to another, an annexe housing the sacristy, a small chapel and other ancillary facilities.

Viewed from the main entrance, the nave of the church narrows towards the chancel, located in one of the northern corner of the triangle, and the fan-shaped ceiling becomes gradually lower, creating an impression of a theatre or concert hall. The pulpit is to the left of the 'stage' (as viewed from the back of the church), elevated and slightly indented into the wall.

The southerly elevation, with the main entrance facing towards the city's central market square, is dominated by a pattern of 52 small windows, forming the shape of a large cross.

The church organ was constructed by Veikko Virtanen (who also built the organs in the Turku Cathedral and Temppeliaukio Church), to Aalto's exterior design. The acoustics were designed by Hamilkar Aalto (son of Alvar), and are considered excellent. For this reason, the church is used as a concert venue for the annual Lahti International Organ Festival, as well as frequently hosting other music performances.

In Aalto's original plan the seating capacity was 1,400, but this was reduced in the final design to 1,150.

== Setting ==
Ristinkirkko is situated in a dominant position in the Lahti cityscape, in the vicinity of the market square, the city hall designed by Eliel Saarinen, and other notable buildings.

It is surrounded by the small Kirkkopuisto park, originally created for the old church, which Aalto made a particular effort to conserve, resulting in only a few old trees needing to be felled to make way for the new church.

The park also houses the city's war memorial along with a 1952 sculpture Vapauden Hengetär ('Spirit of Freedom') by Wäinö Aaltonen. Earlier an open-air church was intended to be built in the park, but this plan never materialised.

== Gallery ==
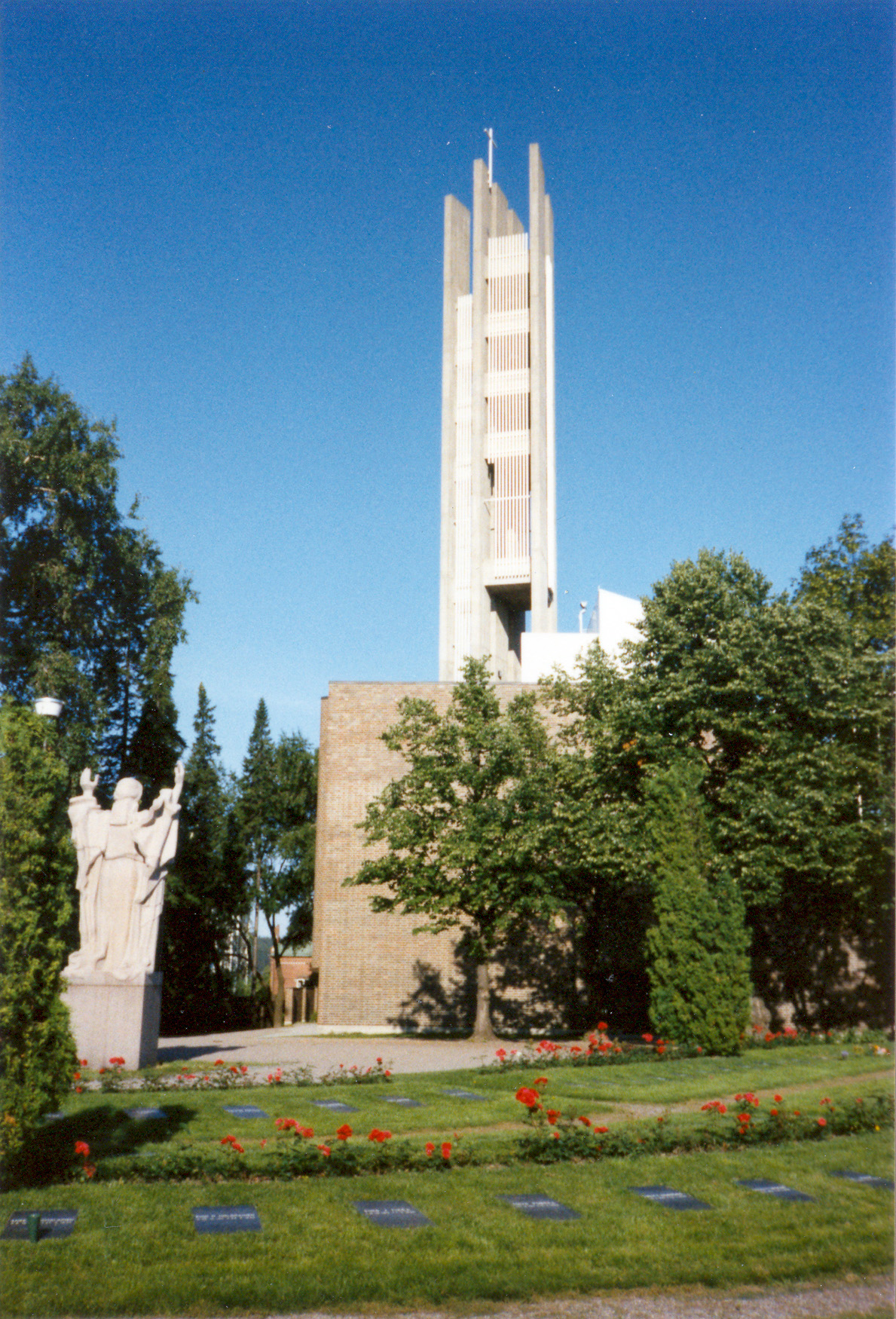
Ristinkirkko seen from the east, with the Vapauden Hengetär sculpture in the foreground

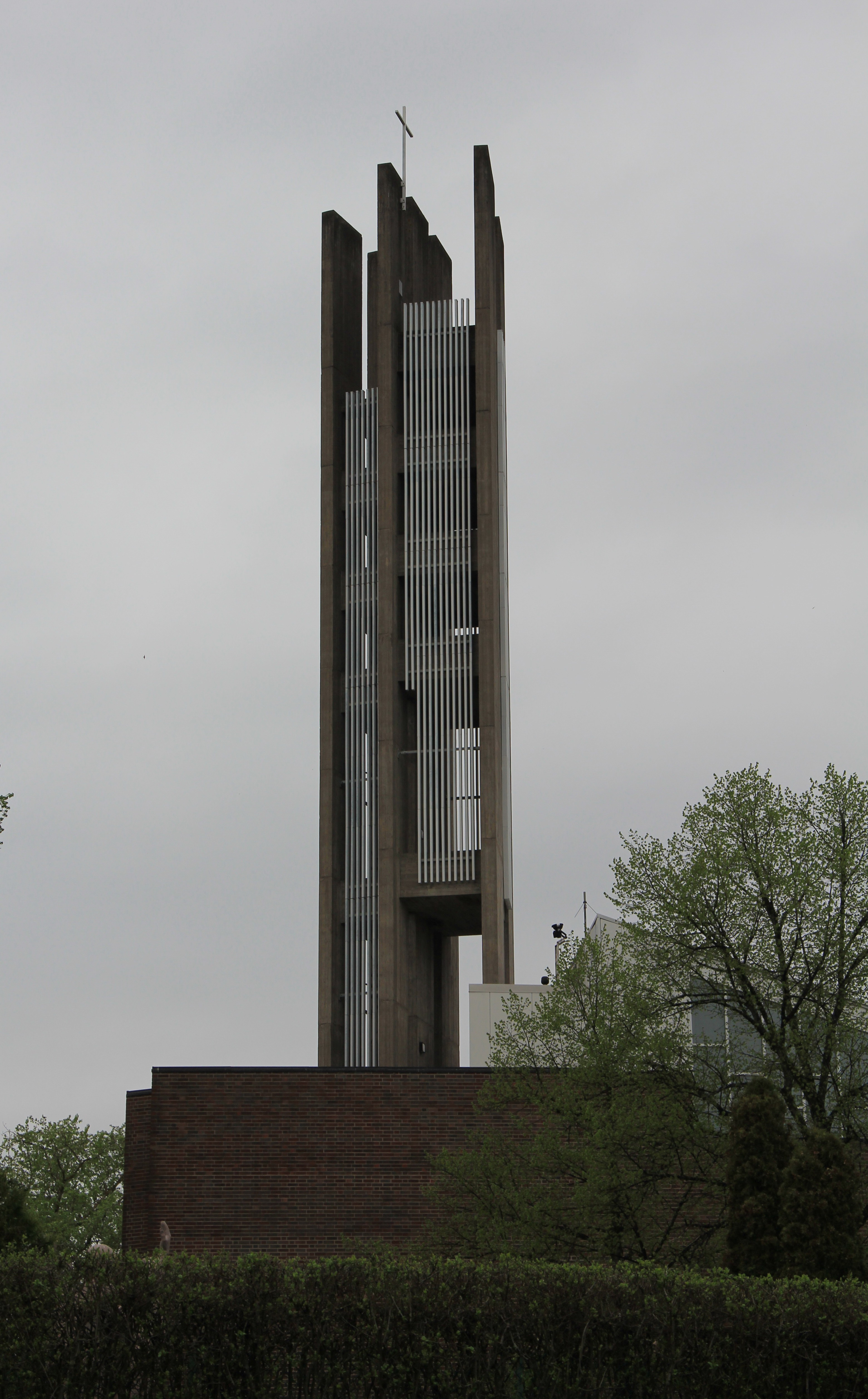
Bell tower

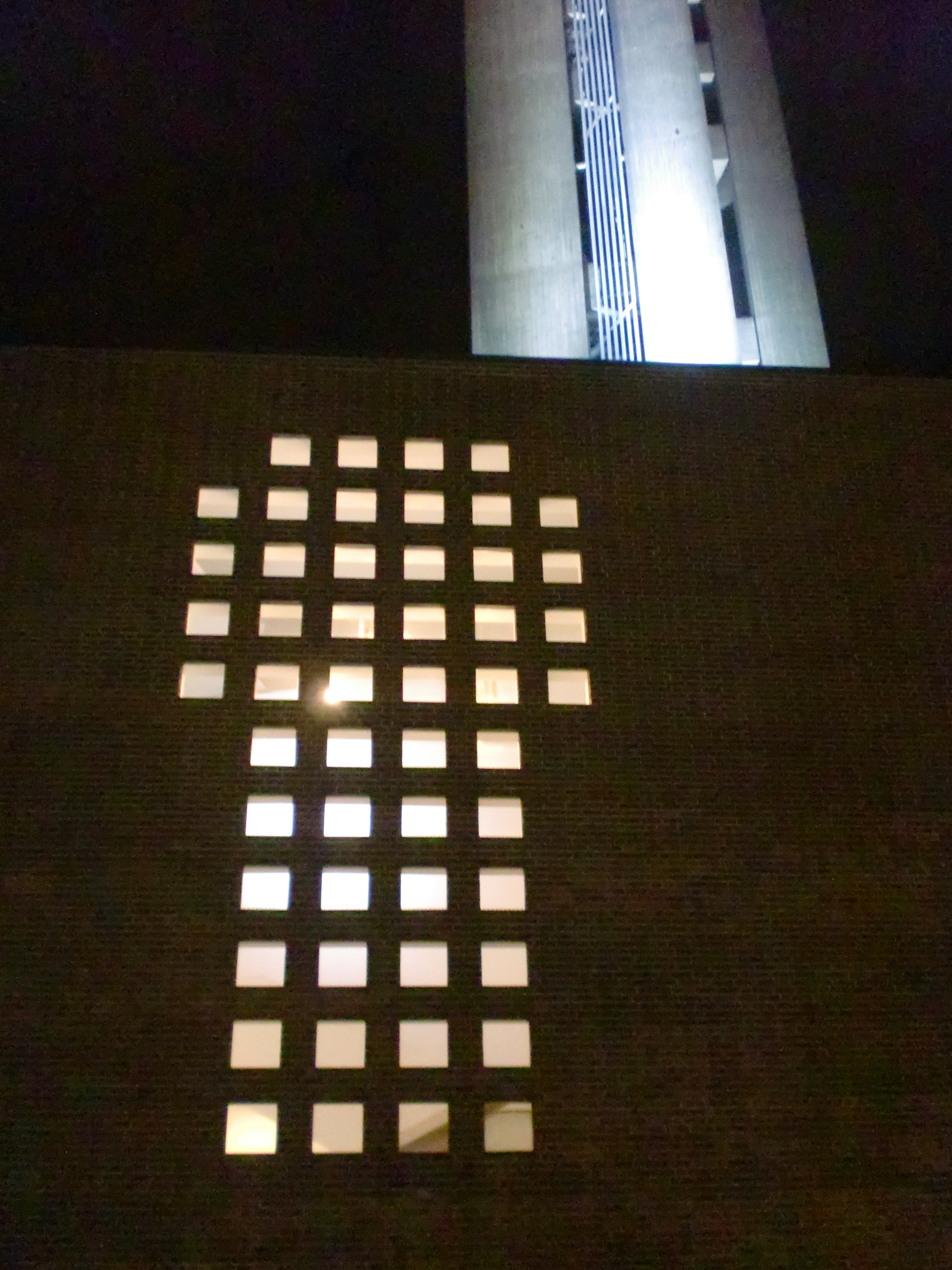
Exterior view at night, with the 'window cross' clearly visible

== See also ==
- Lakeuden Risti Church, another Aalto-designed church, with some similarities in design.
