= Georg Schnéevoigt =

Finnish conductor and cellist (1872–1947)

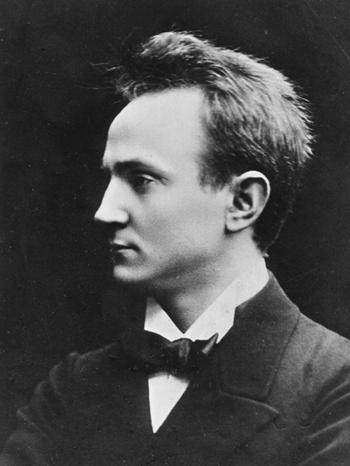
Schnéevoigt, c. 1900

Georg Lennart Schnéevoigt (8 November 1872 – 28 November 1947) was a Finnish conductor and cellist. He was born in Vyborg, Grand Duchy of Finland, which is now in Russia, to Ernst Schnéevoigt and Rosa Willandt.

== Career ==
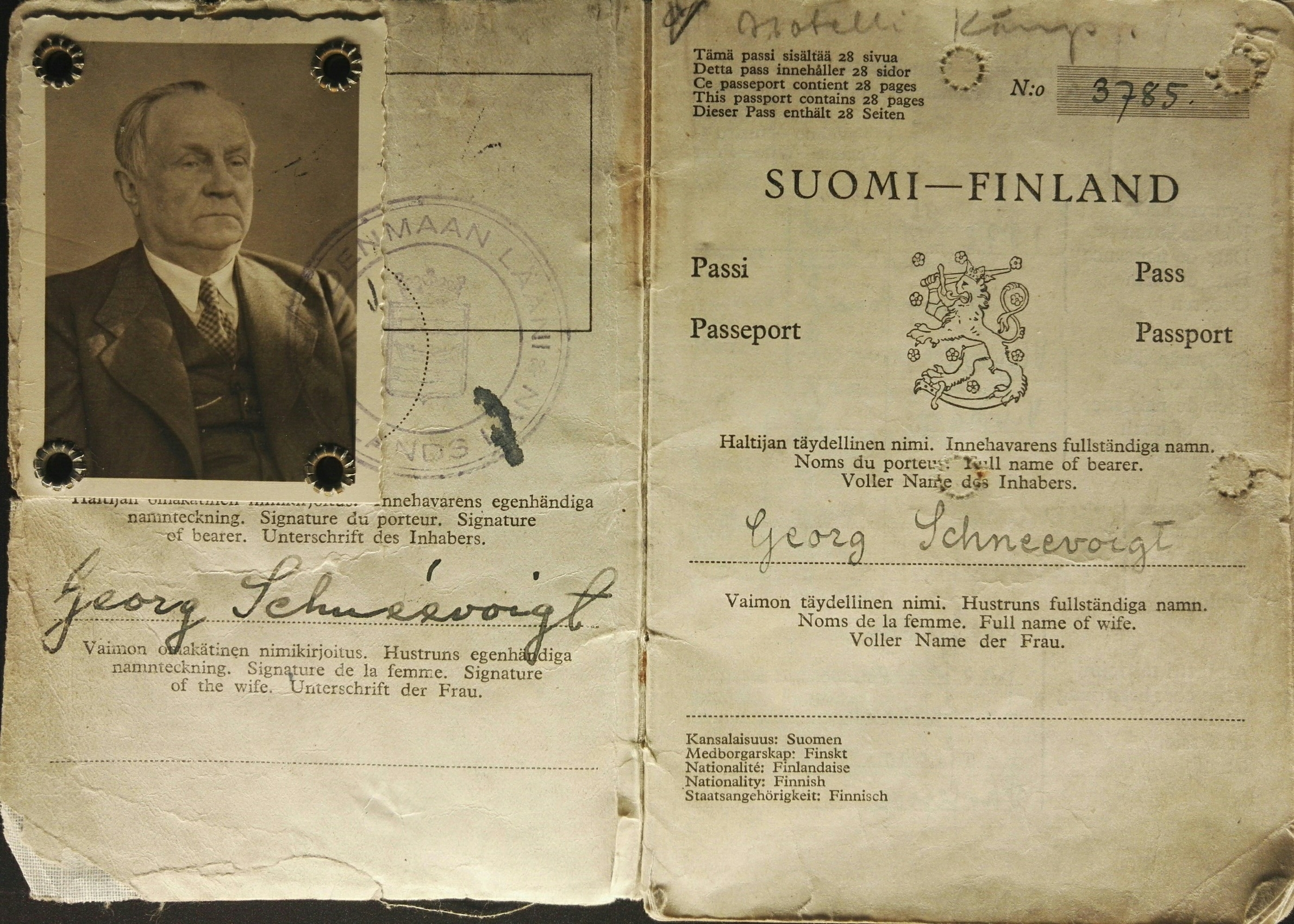
Passport belonging to Schnéevoigt

Schnéevoigt began his career as a cellist performing throughout Europe in the 1890s. He was principal cellist of the Helsinki Philharmonic from 1896 to 1902. After this, he conducted many orchestras including the Kaim Orchestra (now the Munich Philharmonic Orchestra), Riga Philharmonic Orchestra which he founded, Oslo Philharmonic (1919–1921), the Stockholm Concert Society (later the Royal Stockholm Philharmonic Orchestra), the Sydney Symphony, and the Los Angeles Philharmonic. From 1930 until his death in 1947, Schnéevoigt was chief conductor of the Malmö Symphony Orchestra.

In Europe young Schnéevoigt was considered skilled, but by a 1963 description in a history of the Los Angeles Philharmonic, Schnéevoigt's conducting style was characterised as "flaccid", "paunchy", "phlegmatic", and "plodding", with "little or no sense of direction so far as discipline was concerned". This notwithstanding, his passion for the music of Sibelius was such that he cried when conducting his works.

The 1963 Los Angeles Philharmonic account is not in accordance with contemporary descriptions of Schnéevoigt's conducting. The critiques published in the papers of Los Angeles during 1927–1929 were mainly positive and Schnéevoigt's Mahler interpretations were especially applauded. A reason for Schnéevoigt's apparent loss of reputation, may be that he was succeeded by two legendary conductors (Artur Rodziński and Otto Klemperer) and so his achievements were forgotten.

== Life ==
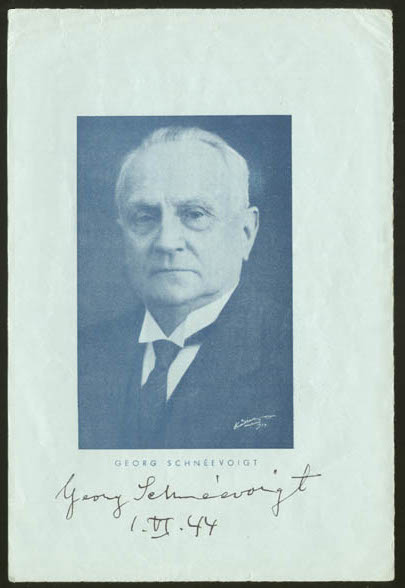
Picture of Schnéevoigt, signed "Georg Schnéevoigt 1.VI.44"

Schnéevoigt's married pianist Sigrid Sundgren-Schnéevoigt in 1907, she and Schnéevoigt would often perform together.

Schnéevoigt died in Malmö, Sweden, in 1947 at the age of 75.

== Schnéevoigt and Sibelius ==
Schnéevoigt was a close friend of composer Jean Sibelius and often performed Sibelius's orchestral music. He conducted the first performance in Finland of Luonnotar in January 1914. After Kajanus' death in 1933, Schnéevoigt discovered the manuscripts of Sibelius's tone poems "Lemminkäinen and the Maidens" and "Lemminkäinen in Tuonela" (from the Lemminkäinen Suite), which had been thought lost, among Robert Kajanus' papers, and gave their first performance since 1894.

On 3 June 1934, Schnéevoigt and the Finnish National Orchestra traveled to London, where Schnéevoigt made the first recording of Sibelius's Symphony No 6. It had originally been planned for Robert Kajanus, another close friend of Sibelius, to record the symphony, but following his death it was instead done by Schnéevoigt.

Preceded by none	Principal conductor, Royal Stockholm Philharmonic; 1915–1924	Succeeded by Václav Talich
Preceded by Emil Cooper	Chief conductor, Latvian National Opera; 1929–1931	Succeeded by Leo Blech
Preceded by Walther Meyer-Radon	Chief conductor, Malmö Symphony Orchestra; 1930–1947	Succeeded by Sten-Åke Axelson
Preceded by Robert Kajanus	Principal conductor, Helsinki Philharmonic; 1932–1940	Succeeded by Armas Järnefelt
