= Toivo Haapanen =

Finnish conductor and music scholar

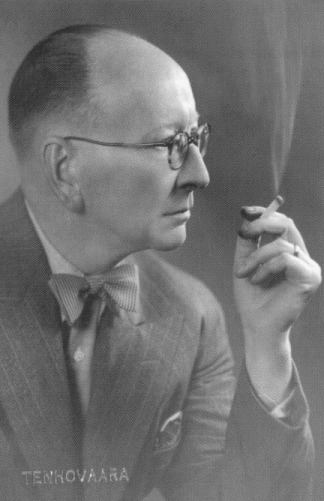
- Born: Toivo Elias Haapanen; 15 May 1889
- Died: 22 July 1950 (aged 61)
- Occupation: Music scholar
- Era: 20th century

Toivo Elias Haapanen (15 May 1889 – 22 July 1950) was a Finnish conductor and music scholar.

== Early life and education ==
Haapanen was born in 1889 in Karvia, Finland. His sister was the writer Tyyni Tuulio. His son was the violinist and professor Tuomas Haapanen (1924–2024).

After high school, he began playing the violin. Starting in 1907 studied the violin and music theory at the Helsinki Philharmonic Orchestra school. He completed in his studies in 1911. In 1918, he graduated from the University of Helsinki with a Bachelor of Arts. In 1925, he received his Ph.D.

== Career ==
Haapenen became Chief Conductor of the Finnish Radio Symphony Orchestra in 1929. He served in this position until 1951. Starting in 1946, he also served as Music Manager of the Finnish Broadcasting Company. He was also a professor at the University of Helsinki.

As a conductor, Haapanen traveled throughout Europe, including Germany, Poland, Hungary and Italy. As a musical scholar, he collected and studied Medieval Finnish music, dating from 1050 to 1522. The collection is held by the University of Helsinki Library. He wrote a history of Finnish music in 1940. He also worked as a magazine music critic from 1919 to 1929. He served on two committees, including chairman of the Finnish council on music from 1943 until 1950.

He was awarded the Latvian Order of the Three Stars 4th Class on 15 November 1935.
