= Kullervo =

Character in Finnish mythology

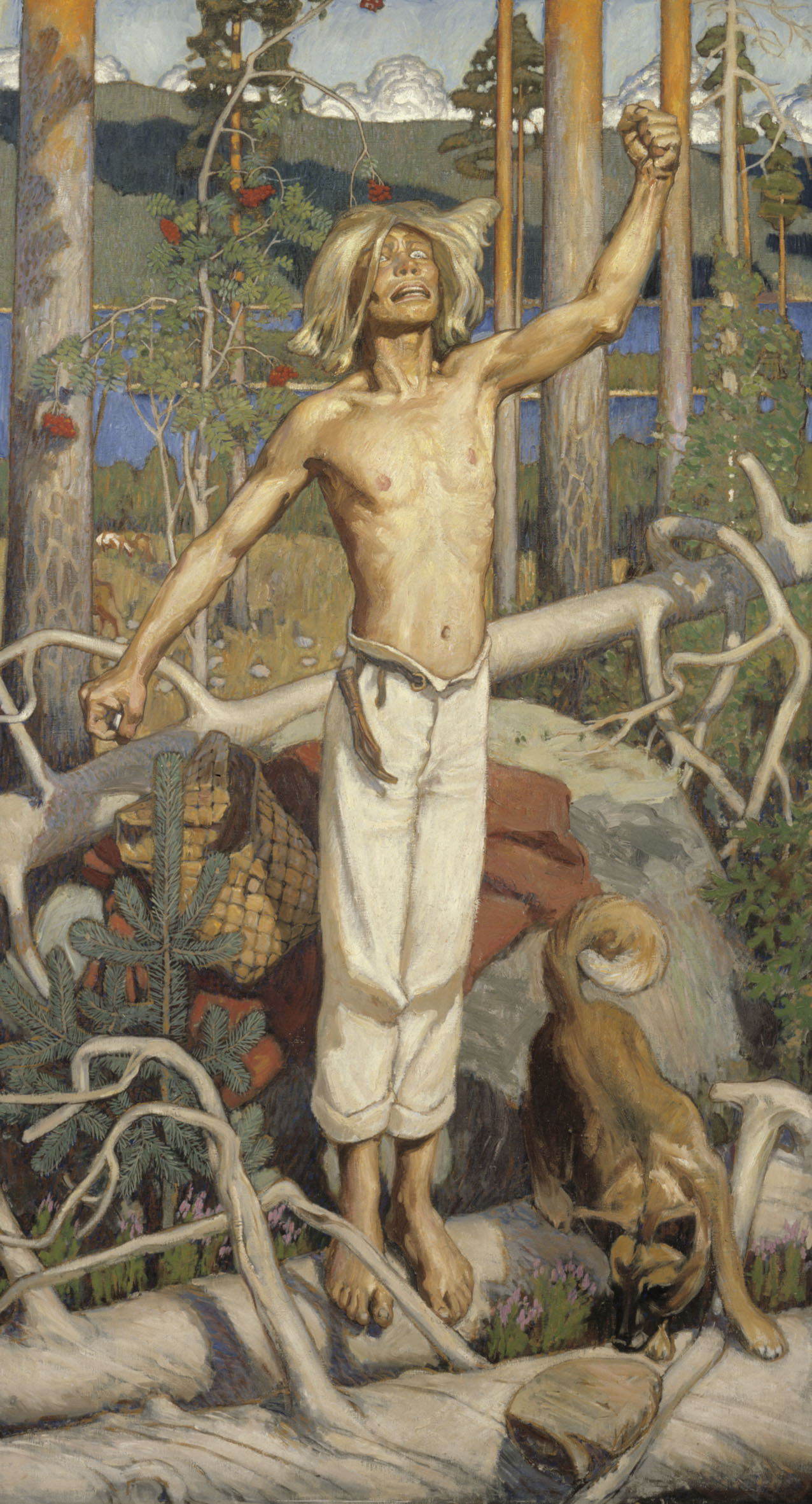
Kullervo's Curse by the Finnish painter Akseli Gallen-Kallela from 1899. It depicts a scene from the Kalevala in which Kullervo curses beasts from the woods to attack his tormenter, the Maiden of the North.

Kullervo (Finnish pronunciation: [ˈkulːerʋo]) is a hero in Finnish and Estonian mythology. He is often called a son of Kaleva. He also appears as an ill-fated character in the epic Kalevala by Elias Lönnrot.

== In runic songs ==
Runic songs of Kullervo mention him as a son of Kaleva. Sometimes, his father is called Kalervo, but this is a later variation which morphed from Kaleva. Ingrian and Karelian runic songs further tell of the fight between two families, the other being the family of Kaleva or Kalevainen, who ruin each other's fields and possibilities to survive. Kalevainen and his family were exterminated but an unborn child survives and continues the family feud, bakes a stone inside the bread of a mean mistress of a house, and ends up committing incest. In a different runic song from Ilomantsi, after killing Kaleva, the enemies try to kill his son by throwing him into a large bonfire. However, he had the ability to control fire. To avenge his family, he asks Ilmarinen to forge him a sword and goes to war. Other songs tell he was later defeated on the battlefield. In a runic song written down in the 1700s from an unknown location, it is Kullervo himself who is killed (on the battlefield) but has an unborn child who is later thrown into fire, who is able to control fire.

In runic songs from Estonia, Kuller Kalevi poega ("Kuller, son of Kalev") creates himself an artificial wife from gold or wood. However, the golden maiden is cold to the touch. Kullervo is not always the protagonist of this story, as it might also be Lemminkäinen, an unnamed smith or Kalev himself. In runic songs from Finland, the smith is usually Ilmarinen or Väinämöinen. The songs end with the commandment that one must not make himself a wife out of gold and silver.

In a runic song from Kainuu, a cowshed snake is born out of Kullervo's war spear snapping into two. In this context, his name appears as Istervo in North Karelia, Istervö in North Karelia, Ladoga Karelia and North Savo, Istori in South Savo, Lispervo in Ladoga Karelia, Lisperi in North Karelia, and Histervo in North Karelia and in a runic song from an unknown location.

In a runic song from South Savo, Kullervo asks, as he is going to war, if his father and mother would cry after hearing he has died. His father says no, as he would simply make another, better son. However, his mother says she would cry so much it would melt all the snow and turn earth green. When he gets the message that his mother has died, he doesn't care, thinking he could make a better mother for himself from seeds, twigs and leaves. In a runic song from Central Finland, when he gets the message he similarly doesn't care, being too busy fighting in the war.

In some runic songs, an unnamed "beautiful son of Kaleva" is sold as a slave to a smith in Karelia. When he is asked to look after a child, he kills the child with a disease. When he is asked to build a fence, he ties full grown spruces together with snakes and lizards. When he is asked to herd cattle, his mistress bakes a stone into his bread. This angers him, and he summons bears and wolves to kill the mistress. In many regions, the protagonist in question is identified as Kullervo, but in Ostrobothnia and Kainuu, the protagonist is Soini.

== In the Kalevala ==
Growing up in the aftermath of the massacre of his entire tribe, he comes to realise that the same people who had brought him up, the tribe of Untamo, were also the ones who had slain his family. As a child, he is sold into slavery and mocked and tormented further. When he finally runs away from his masters, he discovers surviving members of his family, only to lose them again. He seduces a girl who turns out to be his own sister, having thought his sister dead. When she finds out it was her own brother who seduced her, she commits suicide. Kullervo becomes mad with rage, returns to Untamo and his tribe, destroys them using his magical powers, and commits suicide.

At the end of the poem the old sage Väinämöinen warns all parents against treating their children too harshly.

The story of Kullervo is laid out in runes (chapters) 31 through 36 of the Kalevala.

=== Rune 31 – Untamo and Kullervo ===
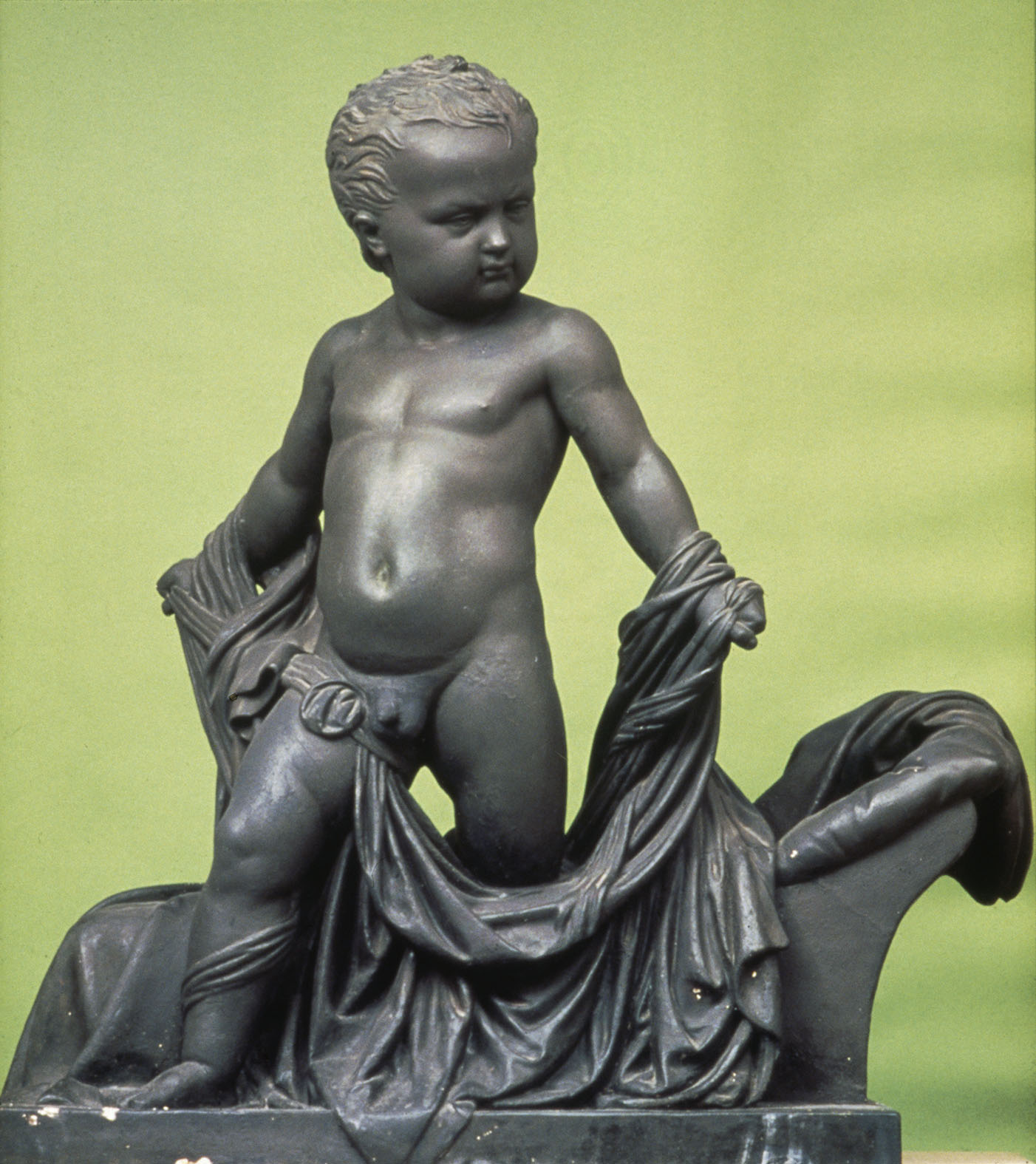
Kullervo Tearing His Swaddling Clothes, Carl Eneas Sjöstrand, 1858

Untamo is jealous of his brother Kalervo, and the strife between the brothers is fed by numerous petty disputes. Eventually Untamo's resentment turns into open warfare, and he kills all of Kalervo's tribe save for one pregnant girl called Untamala, whom Untamo enslaves as his maid. Shortly afterwards, Untamala gives birth to a baby boy she names Kullervo.

When Kullervo is three months old, he can be heard vowing revenge and destruction upon Untamo's tribe. Untamo attempts to kill Kullervo three times (by drowning, fire, and hanging). Each time, the infant Kullervo is saved by his latent magical powers.

Untamo allows the child to grow up, then tries three times to find employment for him as a servant in his household, but all three attempts fail as Kullervo's wanton and wild nature makes him unfit for any domestic task. In the end, Untamo decides to rid himself of the problem by selling Kullervo to Ilmarinen as a slave.

=== Rune 32 – Kullervo and the wife of Ilmarinen ===
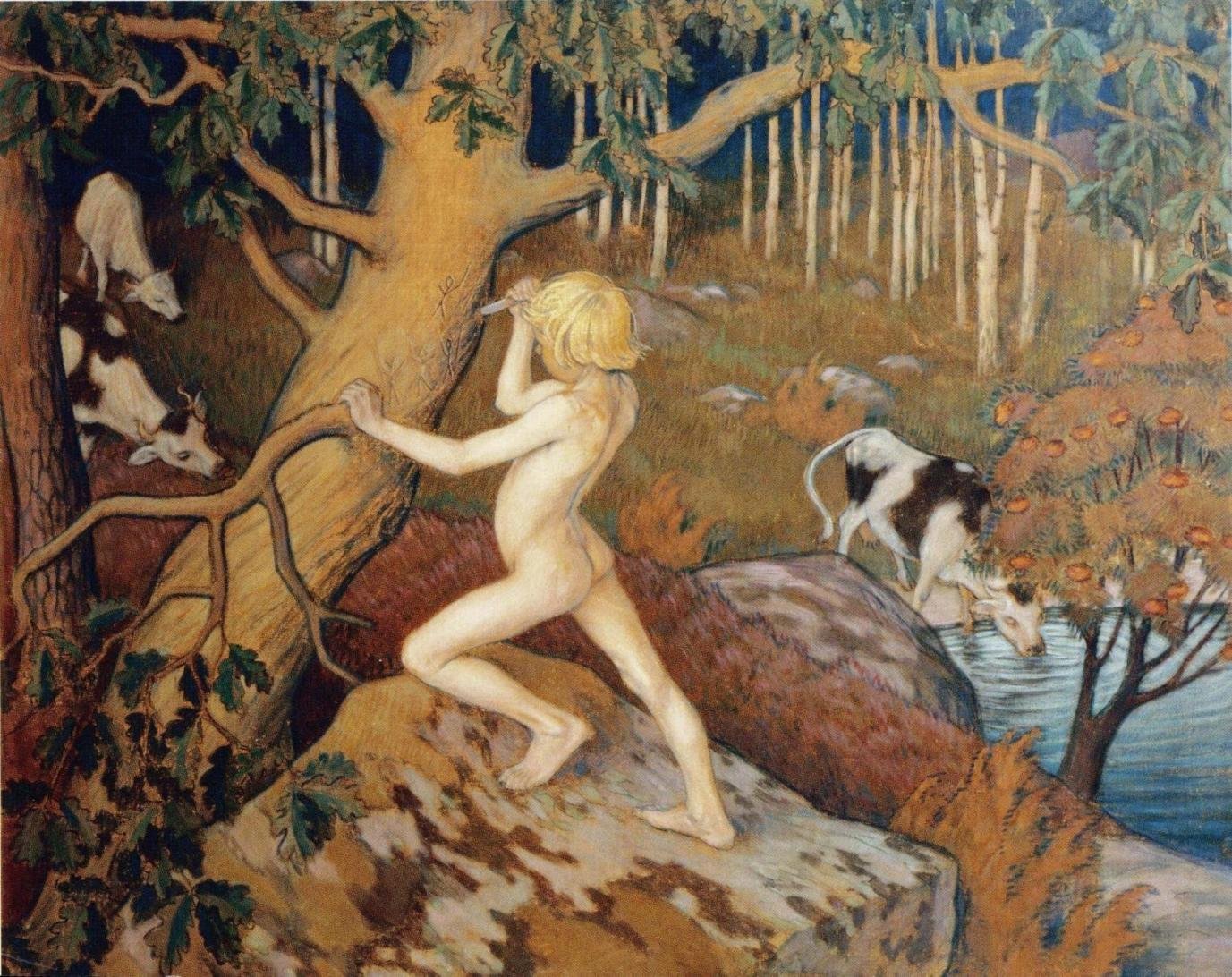
Episode from Kalevala (Kullervo carves his name into an oak), Väinö Blomstedt, 1897

The boy is raised in isolation because of his status as a slave, his fierce temper, and because people fear his growing magical skills. The only memento that the boy retains from his previous life in a loving family is an old knife that had been passed along to him as an infant.

Pohjan Neito/Tytär (Maiden/Daughter of the North), wife of Ilmarinen, enjoys tormenting the slave boy, now a youth, and sends Kullervo out to herd her cows with a loaf of bread with stones baked into it. This chapter includes a lengthy magical poem invoking various deities to grant their protection over the herd and to keep the owners prosperous.

=== Rune 33 – The death of Ilmarinen's wife ===
Kullervo sits down to eat, but his beloved heirloom knife breaks on one of the stones in the bread. Kullervo is overwhelmed with rage. He drives the cows away to the fields, then summons up bears and wolves from the woods, making them appear like cows instead. He herds these to Ilmarinen's house and tells the wicked mistress of the house to milk them, upon which they turn back into wolves and bears and maul her. As she lies there bleeding, she invokes the high god Ukko to kill Kullervo with a magic arrow, but Kullervo prays for the spell to kill her instead for her wickedness, which it indeed does.

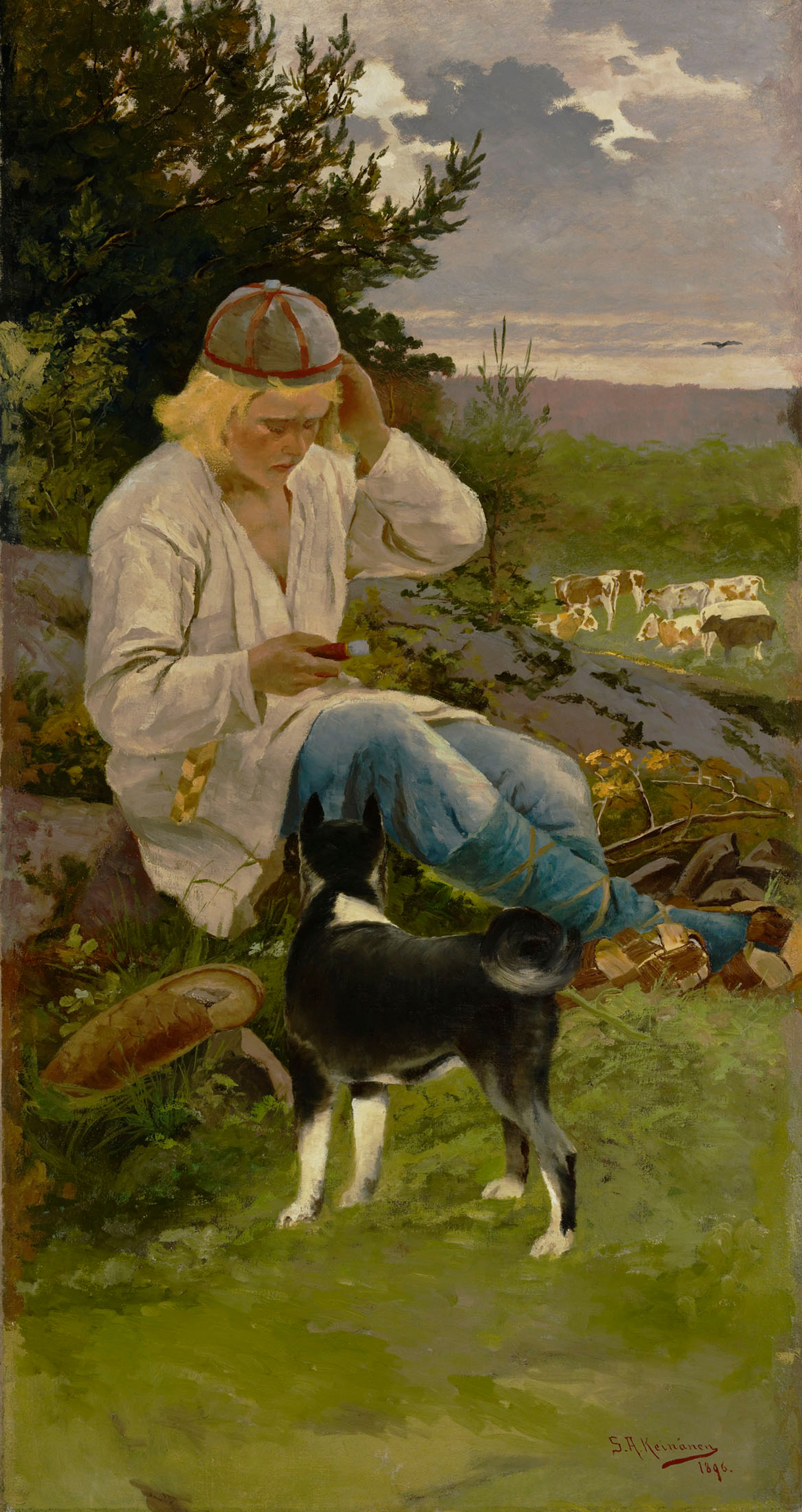
Kullervo with His Herds, Sigfrid Keinänen, 1896

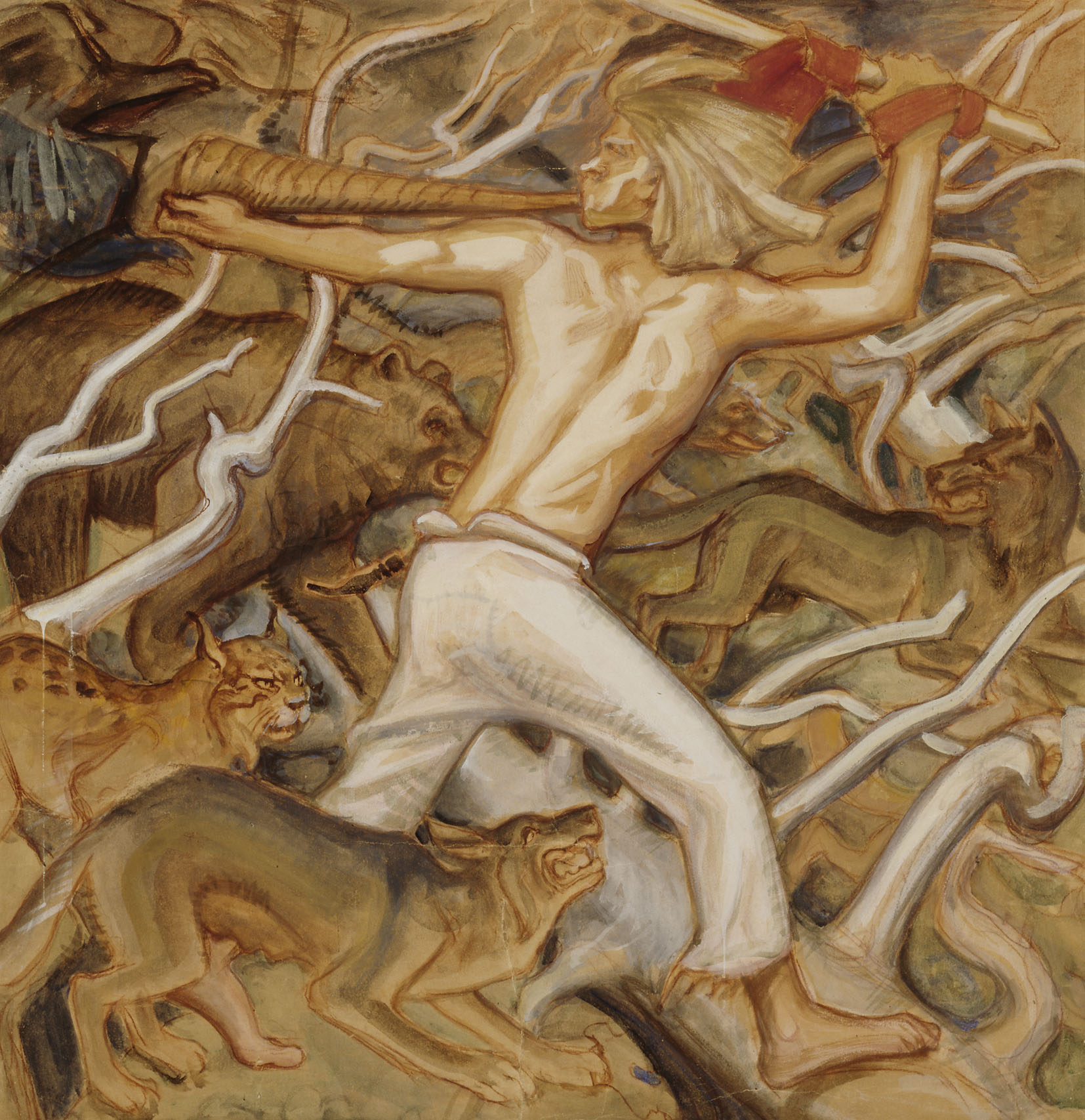
Kullervo herding his wild Flocks, Akseli Gallen-Kallela, 1917

=== Rune 34 – Kullervo and his parents ===
Kullervo then flees from slavery and finds that his family is actually still alive except for his sister, who has disappeared and is feared dead.

=== Rune 35 – Kullervo and his sister ===
Kullervo's father has no more success than Untamo in finding work suited for his son, and thus sends the young man to collect taxes due to his tribe. On his way back home in his sleigh, Kullervo propositions several girls he sees on the way: all of them reject him. Finally, he meets a beggar-girl who also rejects him at first, struggling and screaming when he pulls her into his sleigh. But he starts talking to her sweetly and shows her all the gold he's collected during his trip, bribing her into sleeping with him. Afterwards, she asks who he is, and as she realises he's her own brother, she commits suicide by throwing herself into the rapidly rushing river nearby. The distraught Kullervo returns to his family and tells his mother what happened.

=== Rune 36 – The death of Kullervo ===
Kullervo vows revenge on Untamo. One by one, his family members try to dissuade him from the fruitless path of evil and revenge. His mother asks what will become of her and Kullervo's father in their old age, and what will become of Kullervo's siblings if he's not there to take care of them, but Kullervo only replies that they can all die for all he cares about is revenge. As he leaves, he asks if his father, brother and sister will mourn him if he dies, but they say they won't—that they'd rather wait for a better son and brother to be born who is cleverer and more handsome. Finally, Kullervo asks his mother if she'll weep for him, and she replies that she will. Kullervo hardens his heart and refuses to reconsider, and goes to war full of haughty pride, singing and playing his horn.

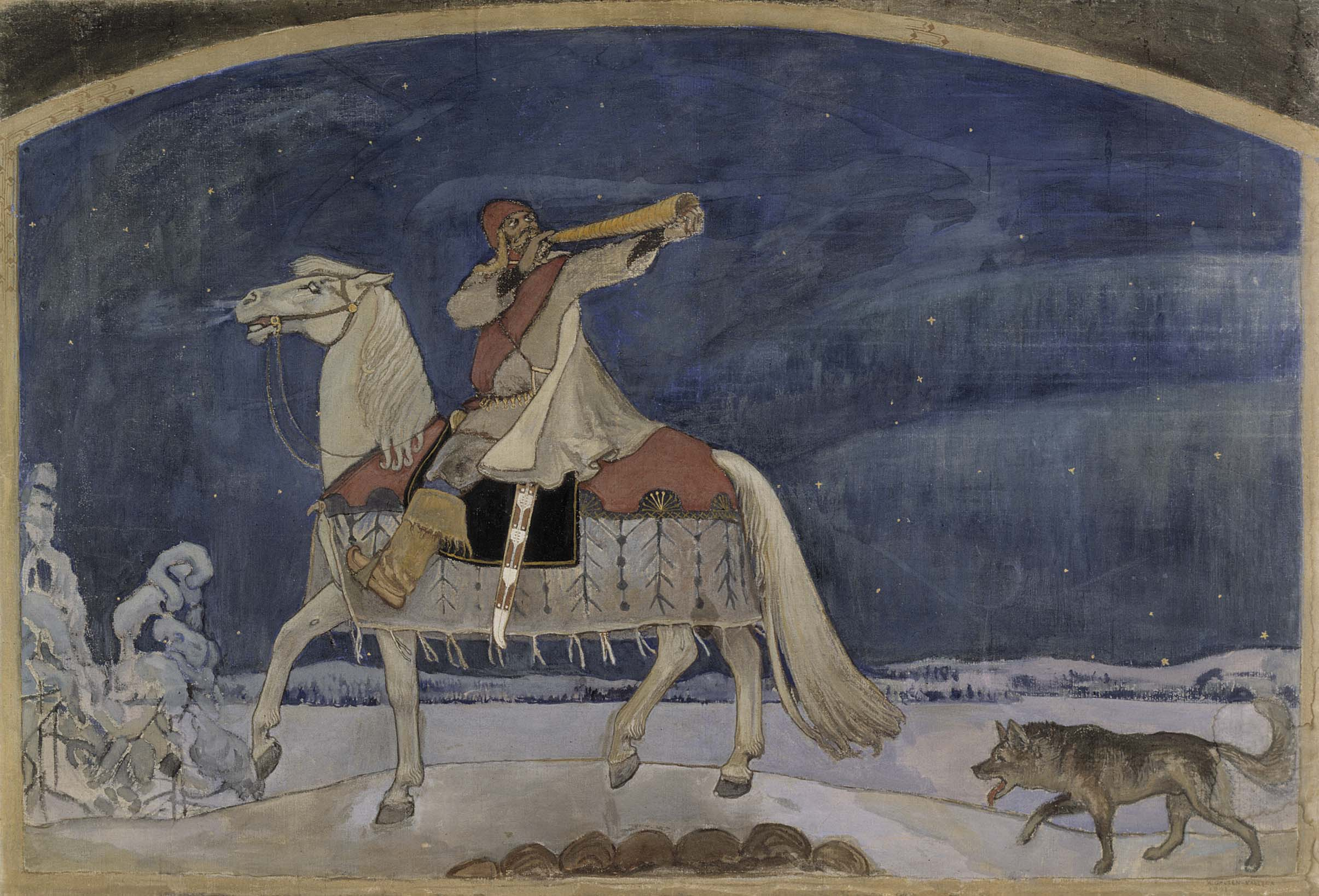
Kullervo Sets Off for War, Akseli Gallen-Kallela, 1901

He becomes so obsessed with his revenge that even as he learns of the deaths of his family members during his journey, he doesn't even stop to honour their deaths, apart from weeping a little for his mother—yet he does not pause in his quest for revenge. He prays to the high god Ukko to get from him a magical broadsword, which he then uses to slay Untamo and his tribe, sparing no one, burning down his entire village.

When he returns home, he finds the dead bodies of his own family littered about the estate. His mother's ghost speaks to him from her grave and advises him to take his dog and go to the wild woods for shelter. He does so, but instead of finding shelter, he only discovers the place by the river where he'd seduced his sister, the earth still mourning out loud of his ruining of her: no plants grow in the spot where he'd slept with her, either.

Kullervo then asks of Ukko's sword if it will have his life. The sword eagerly accepts, noting that as a weapon it doesn't care whose blood it drinks—it's drunk both innocent and guilty blood before. Kullervo commits suicide by throwing himself on his sword. On hearing the news, Väinämöinen comments that children should never be given away or ill-treated in their upbringing, lest like Kullervo they fail to attain understanding and a man's discretion.

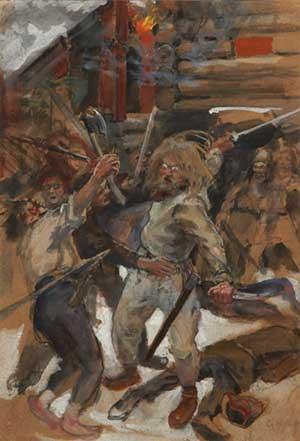
Kullervo as an Avenger by Gallen-Kallela, 1893

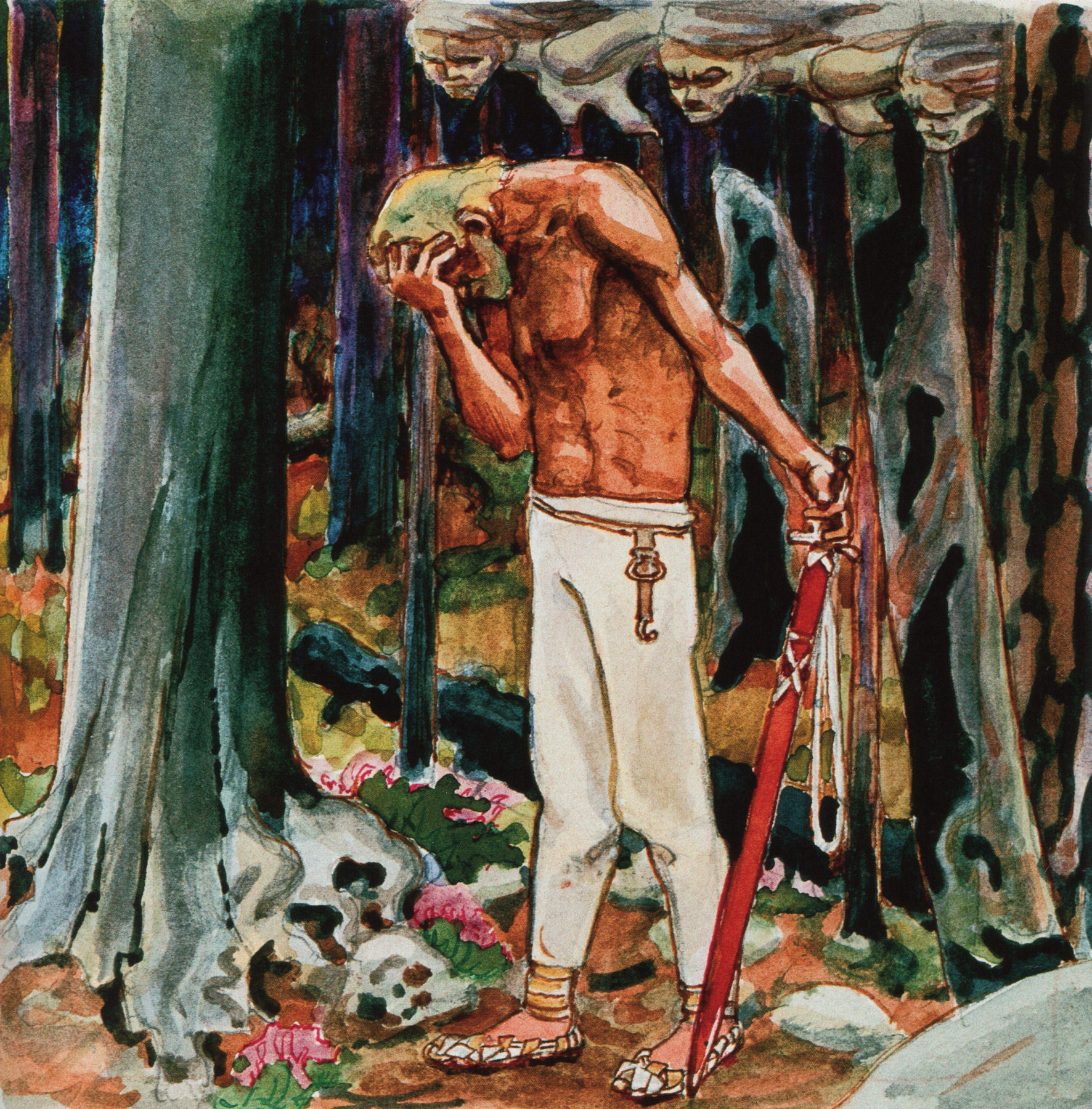
Regretful Kullervo by Gallen-Kallela, 1918

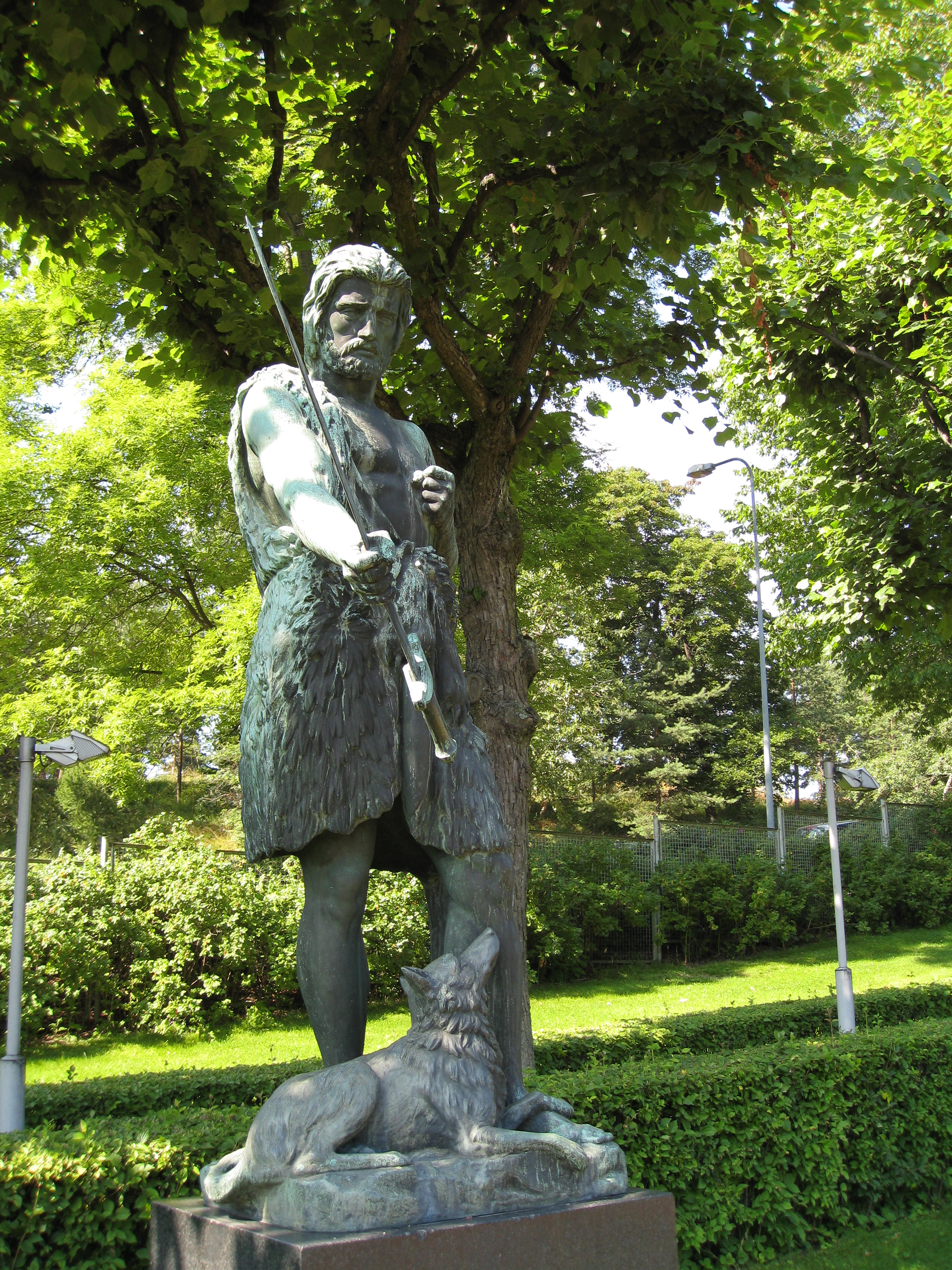
Kullervo Speaks to His Sword, Carl Eneas Sjöstrand, 1868, cast into bronze in 1932

== Evaluation ==
Kullervo is fairly ordinary in Finnish mythology, in being a naturally talented magician; however, he is the only irredeemably tragic example. He showed great potential, but being raised badly, he became an ignorant, implacable, immoral and vengeful man.

The death poem of Kullervo in which he, like Macbeth, interrogates his blade, is famous. Unlike the dagger in Macbeth, Kullervo's sword replies, bursting into song: it affirms that if it gladly participated in his other foul deeds, it would gladly drink of his blood also. This interrogation has been duplicated in J.R.R. Tolkien's The Children of Húrin with Túrin Turambar talking to his black sword, Gurthang, before committing suicide. (Túrin also, like Kullervo, unwittingly fell in love with his own sister and was devastated when he learned the truth, his sister also killing herself).

Jääkärimarssi (Jäger March), a well-known Finnish military march, evokes Kullervo's bitterness in the lines me nousemme kostona Kullervon/soma on sodan kohtalot koittaa (We arise like the wrath of Kullervo/so sweet are the fates of war to undergo).

The story of Kullervo is unique among ancient myths in its realistic depiction of the effects of child abuse. Canto 36 ends with Väinämöinen stating that an abused child will never attain a healthy state of mind even as an adult, but will instead grow up to be a very disturbed person.

Then the aged Väinämöinen,
When he heard that he had perished,
And that Kullervo had fallen,
Spoke his mind in words that follow:
"Never, people, in the future,
Rear a child in crooked fashion,
Rocking them in stupid fashion,
Soothing them to sleep like strangers.
Children reared in crooked fashion,
Boys thus rocked in stupid fashion,
Grow not up with understanding,
Nor attain to man's discretion,
Though they live till they are aged,
And in body well-developed."

— "Kullervo" from Kalevala,

^{^{Translation by William Forsell Kirby}}

Silloin vanha Väinämöinen,
kunpa kuuli kuolleheksi,
Kullervon kaonneheksi,
sanan virkkoi, noin nimesi:
"Elkötte, etinen kansa,
lasta kaltoin kasvatelko
luona tuhman tuuittajan,
vierahan väsyttelijän!
Lapsi kaltoin kasvattama,
poika tuhmin tuuittama
ei tule älyämähän,
miehen mieltä ottamahan,
vaikka vanhaksi eläisi,
varreltansa vahvistuisi.".

== In drama, music, poetry and games ==
Kullervo is an eponymous 1860 play by Aleksis Kivi. An English translation, by Douglas Robinson, was published in 1993: Aleksis Kivi's Heath Cobblers and Kullervo.

Kullervo is an eponymous 1892 choral symphony in five movements for full orchestra, two vocal soloists, and male choir by Jean Sibelius. It was opus 7 for Sibelius and his first successful work.

Kullervo's Curse (1899) and Kullervo Rides to War (1901) are two paintings by Akseli Gallen-Kallela on the myth.

In the Jäger March (Jääkärin marssi) by Jean Sibelius one of the lines reads: Me nousemme kostona Kullervon, in English: We shall rise as Kullervo's revenge.

Kullervo is the subject of a 1988 opera by Aulis Sallinen.

Kullervo is also the subject of a symphonic poem composed in 1913 by Leevi Madetoja.

In 2006, the Finnish metal band Amorphis released the album Eclipse, which tells the story of Kullervo according to a play by Paavo Haavikko. The play has been translated into English by Anselm Hollo.

The Hilliard Ensemble commissioned an English language setting of Kullervo's story, Kullervo's Message, from Veljo Tormis.

In June 2023, the video game Warframe released a new playable character named for and inspired by Kullervo.

The 1938 play Suomi by Elizabeth Goudge (1900-1984), in her Three Plays: Suomi; The Brontës of Haworth; Fanny Burney (Gerald Duckworth, 1939), includes a Kullervo-like character in her modern story of Finland's struggle for independence from Tsarist Russia. The mother in the story is called "Suomi", a nickname based on the Finnish word for "Finland". Her two sons are Olof and Kryosti. Olof (a Lemminkäinen-figure) is killed by Russians. Kryosti (as a Kullervo-figure) is exiled to Siberia. When he returns, eighteen years later, during the Russian Revolution, he kills Olof's son, Sigurd, and then, in a fit of remorse, Kryosti commits suicide. Following the incest-motif of the story of Kullervo, Sigurd and Anna are the twin children of Olof. Ignorant of the fact that they are brother and sister, they marry. But Anna dies in childbirth, and Sigurd is murdered by Kryosti, because of his insane jealousy of his own brother, Olof.

In August 2024, it was announced that Antti Jokinen has been attached to direct the upcoming film Kalevala: The Story of Kullervo, and Elias Salonen has been cast as the title character in the film.

=== Influence on J. R. R. Tolkien ===
J. R. R. Tolkien wrote an interpretation of the Kullervo cycle in 1914; the piece was finally published in its unfinished form as The Story of Kullervo in Tolkien Studies in 2010, as edited by Verlyn Flieger. It was re-published in book form in 2015 by HarperCollins. It was his first attempt at writing an epic narrative but was never completed. The story acted as a seed for the epic tale of Túrin Turambar which features in The Silmarillion, the "Narn i Chîn Húrin" section of Unfinished Tales and, in a longer form, The Children of Húrin as well as the poem "The Lay of the Children of Húrin".
