= The Polytech Choir =

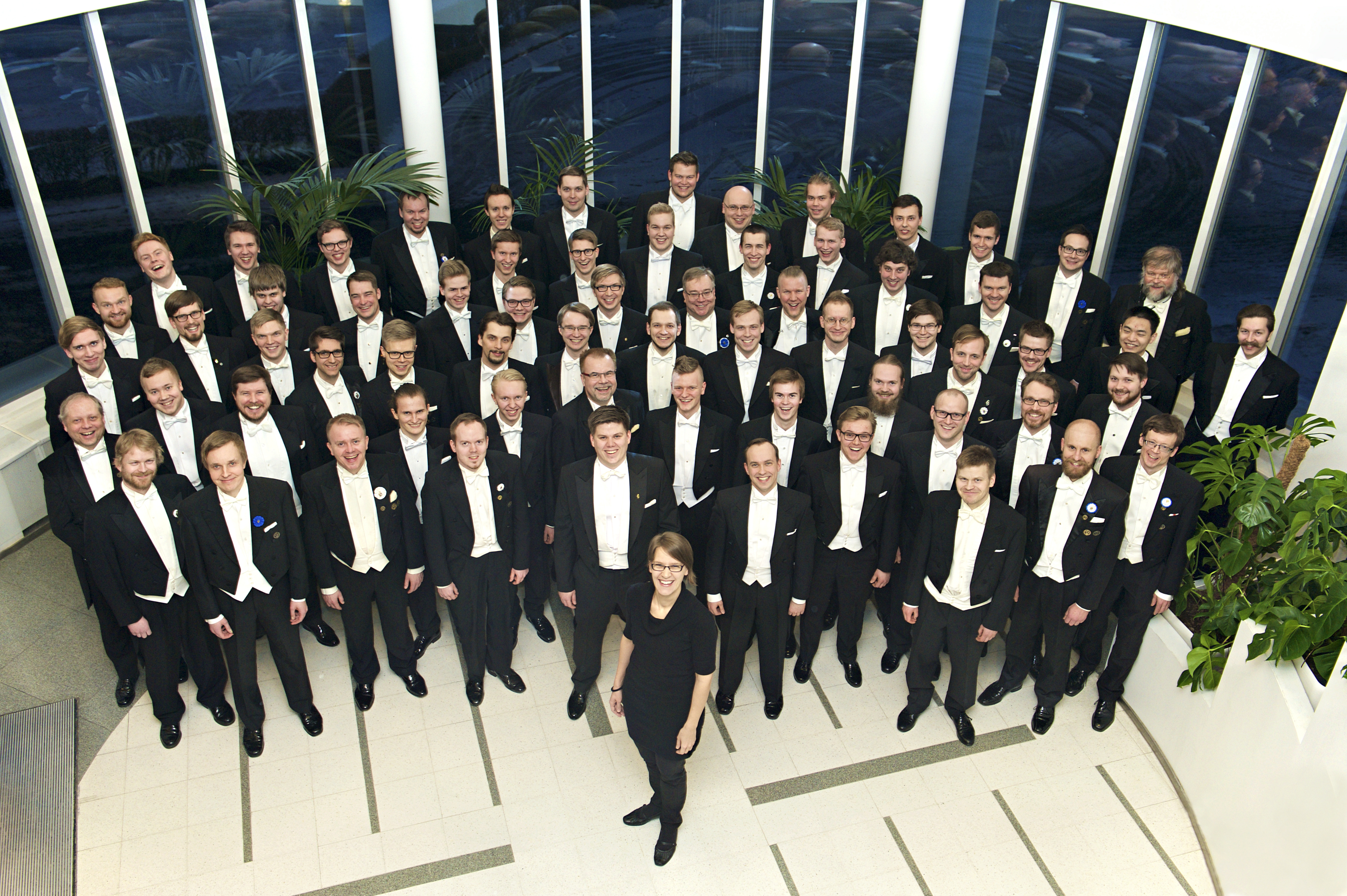
The Polytech Choir and artistic director Saara Aittakumpu in 2017

The Polytech Choir (Finnish: Polyteknikkojen Kuoro; PK) is an academic male choir established in 1900. The majority of the choir's members are engineering students and graduate engineers from Aalto University. The activities of the choir include traditional spring and Christmas concerts, frequent recordings, and performances with leading Finnish symphony orchestras. The choir's current artistic director and conductor, since 2024, is Tatu Erkkilä.

PK's a cappella repertoire consists mainly of classical music, ranging from Renaissance madrigals to the Romantic era and contemporary works, and also includes occasional forays to other genres such as jazz. A centerpiece of the choir's choral symphonic repertoire has been Jean Sibelius' symphonic poem Kullervo. In 2015, the choir made its debut at the BBC Proms, performing Sibelius' Kullervo with the BBC Symphony Orchestra conducted by Sakari Oramo. In addition to performances a cappella and with orchestras, the choir, its quartets and other smaller ensembles frequently perform at private, corporate and academic festivities.

The Polytech Choir has commissioned and premiered nearly 40 new works for male choir during the past 20 years, including two International Rostrum of Composers prizewinners by Jukka Tiensuu and Eero Hämeenniemi, and performed Finnish premieres of works by Luciano Berio and Toru Takemitsu.

== Conductors ==
- Heikki Klemetti (1900–ca. 1905)
- Martti Pitkänen (1910s)
- R.R. Ryynänen (1920s)
- Ossi Elokas (1933–1969)
- Eero Erkkilä (1969–1971)
- Heikki Saari (1971–1984)
- Tapani Länsiö (1984–2004)
- Juha Kuivanen (2004–2013)
- Saara Aittakumpu (2013–2023)
- Tatu Erkkilä (2024–)

== Selected discography ==
- Toki! (contemporary Finnish works for male voice choir composed in the 1980s) (1990)
- Matkalla – Male Voice Voyage (contemporary Finnish works for male voice choir composed in the 1990s) (1999)
- Me toivotamm' (choral works for Christmas, sol. Essi Wuorela) (2000)
- Vuodet – Polyteknikkojen kuoro 100 vuotta (works performed by the choir during its first century) (2004)
- Mies (National Romantic, 20th-century and contemporary works for male voice choir) (2006)
- Kultakausi (Finnish National Romantic works for male voice choir) (2008)
- Joulu on meillä (choral works for Christmas, sol. Matti Salminen) (2009)
- Kuunteletko Sinä (contemporary Finnish works commissioned by the choir between 2007–12) (2013)

== See also ==
- Kauppakorkeakoulun Ylioppilaskunnan Laulajat
- YL Male Voice Choir
