= Kullervo (Madetoja) =

Symphonic poem by Leevi Madetoja

- Symphonic poem by Leevi Madetoja
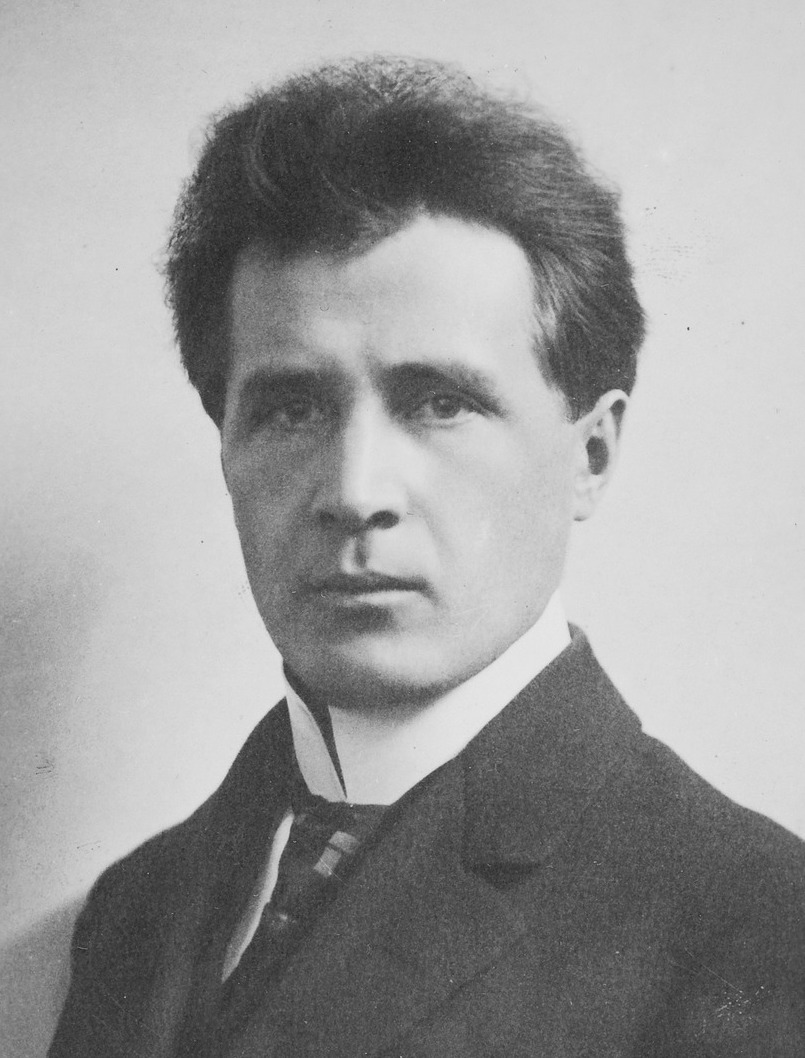
- The composer (c. 1915–1918)
- Opus: 15
- Composed: 1913
- Publisher: Suomen Säveltäjät (1947)
- Duration: Approx. 14 minutes (Note: Although the published score lists 18 minutes as Kullervo's estimated duration, all four commercial recordings last 14 minutes. This article utilizes the latter.)

Premiere
- Date: 14 October 1913
- Location: Helsinki, Finland
- Conductor: Leevi Madetoja
- Performers: Helsinki Philharmonic Society

Kullervo, Op. 15, is a symphonic poem (sinfoninen runoelma) for orchestra written in 1913 by Finnish composer Leevi Madetoja. The piece premiered on 14 October 1913 with Madetoja conducting the Helsinki Philharmonic Society.

== Background ==
=== Composition ===
Although Madetoja belonged to national romantic movement in Finland, he did not—unlike many of the movement's artists and composers, such as Akseli Gallen-Kallela and Jean Sibelius—often turn to the Kalevala as a source of inspiration. Indeed, Kullervo is Madetoja's only notable composition after the national epic. Madetoja was the fourth composer to tackle the subject of Kullervo. First, in 1860, Filip von Schantz wrote the Kullervo Overture (Kullervo-alkusoitto), which he had intended as the prelude to an opera; this piece premiered the same year in Helsinki at the opening of the Swedish Theatre. Second, in 1880, Robert Kajanus composed and premiered in Leipzig Kullervo's Funeral March (Kullervon surumarssi); though Wagnerian in its chromaticism, it makes use of the Finnish folk song O Mother, so pitiable and poor! (Voi äiti parka ja raukka!). Finally, in 1892, Jean Sibelius composed and premiered in Helsinki the choral symphony Kullervo, for baritone, soprano, mixed chorus, and orchestra; however, Sibelius withdrew his Kullervo in 1893, and therefore, it could not have served as a model for Madetoja; it is also unlikely that he was familiar with the pieces by von Schantz and Kajanus. Instead, the most readily-available Kalevala-themed examples would have been Sibelius's Lemminkäinen Suite (from which two numbers, The Swan of Tuonela and Lemminkäinen's Return, had been published in 1900) and Pohjola's Daughter.

=== Premiere ===
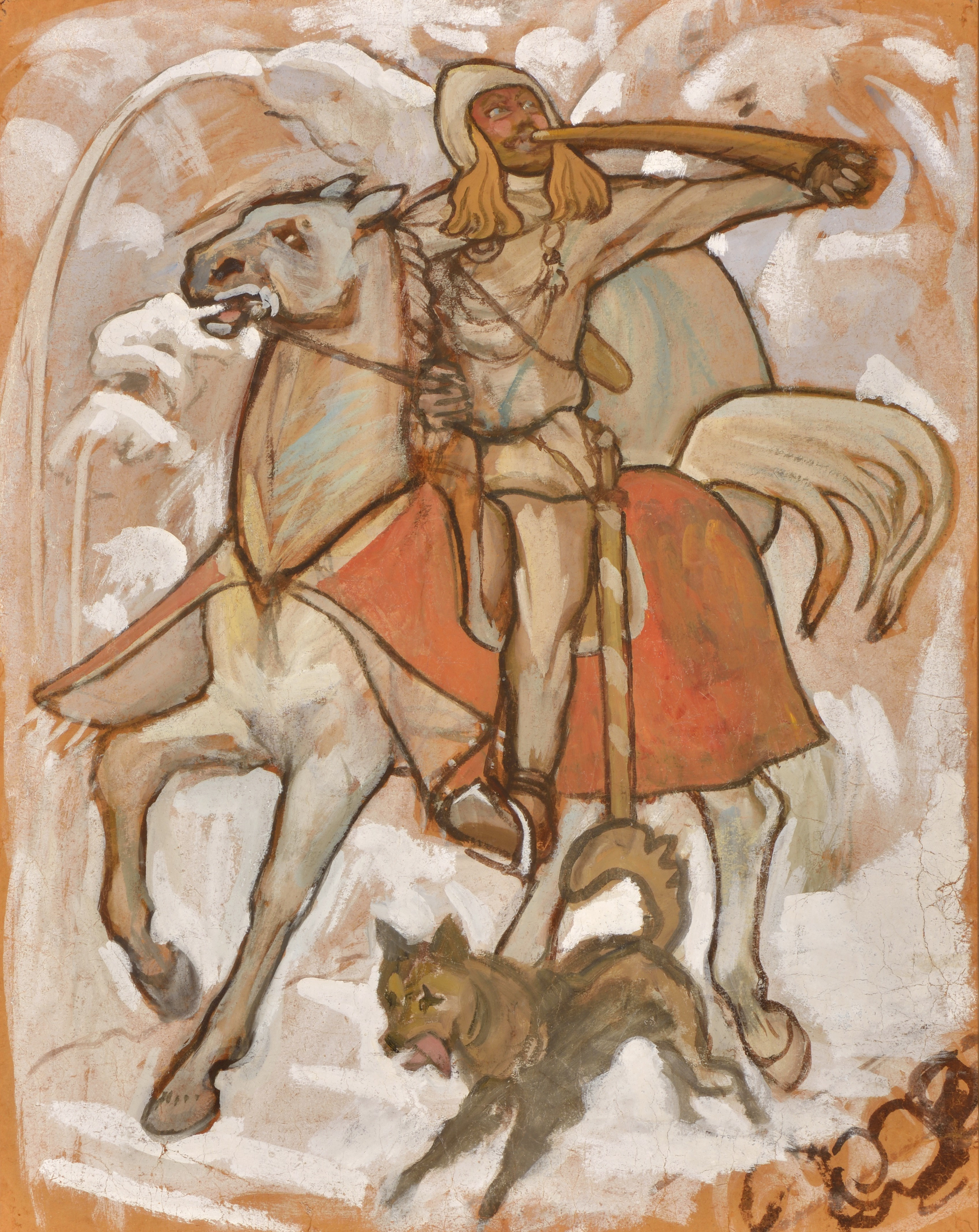
Kullervo—a tragic hero from the Kalevala—inspired many artists and composers.

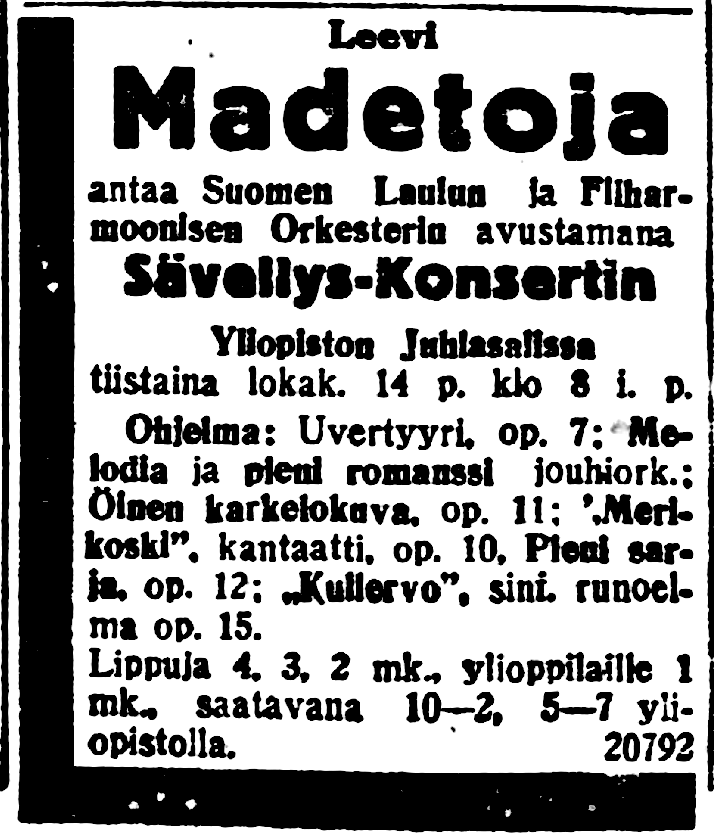
An advertisement promoting the 14 October 1913 premiere of Madetoja's Kullervo.

Kullervo premiered on 14 October 1913 with Madetoja conducting the Helsinki Philharmonic Society. It was the final number on a program that also included other orchestral novelties by Madetoja: the Concert Overture (Konserttialkusoitto; Op. 7, 1911); Melody and Little Romance (Melodia ja Pieni romanssi; Op. 17, 1913); Dance Vision (Tanssinäky; Op. 11; 1911); Merikoski, a cantata for mixed choir and orchestra to text by V. A. Koskenniemi (Op. 10, 1911); and the original three-movement version of the Little Suite (Pieni sarja; Op. 12, 1913). (Note: The Little Suite and Melody and Little Romance were arrangements for orchestra of pieces Madetoja had written for solo piano: respectively, Six Pieces for Piano (Op. 12, 1911–1913) and Piano Pieces (Op. 17, 1912). Finally, Dance Vision premiered under its original title, Night Revels (Öinen karkelokuva).)

== Instrumentation ==
Kullervo is scored for the following instruments:

- Woodwinds: piccolo, 2 flutes, 2 oboes, 2 clarinets (in A), bass clarinet (in A), and 2 bassoons
- Brass: 4 horns (in F), 2 trumpets (in C), 3 trombones, and tuba
- Percussion: timpani, triangle, cymbals, bass drum, tambourine, and castanets
- Strings: violins, violas, cellos, double basses, and harp

Association of Finnish Composers (Suomen Säveltäjät ry) published the symphonic poem in 1947; Fennica Gehrman is the current distributor.

== Recordings ==
The sortable table below lists commercially available recordings of Kullervo:

| Conductor | Orchestra | Rec. (Note: Refers to the year in which the performers recorded the work; this may not be the same as the year in which the recording was first released to the general public.) | Time | Recording venue | Label | Ref. |
|---|---|---|---|---|---|---|
| Leif Segerstam | Finnish Radio Symphony Orchestra | 1981 | 14:07 | Yle's Helsinki studios | Finlandia | (Note: L. Segerstam–Finlandia (FACD 015) 1991) |
| Arvo Volmer | Oulu Symphony Orchestra | 1998 | 14:03 | Madetoja Hall, Oulu Music Centre | Alba | (Note: A. Volmer–Alba (ABCD 211) 2006) |
| John Storgårds | Helsinki Philharmonic Orchestra | 2012 | 14:13 | Helsinki Music Centre | Ondine | (Note: J. Storgårds–Ondine (ODE 1212–2) 2013) |
| Dima Slobodeniouk | Lahti Symphony Orchestra | 2020 | 14:01 | Sibelius Hall | BIS | (Note: D. Slobodeniouk–BIS (BIS–2371) 2021) |

== Notes, references, and sources ==
Notes

Liner notes

- Häyrynen, Antti (2006). Madetoja Orchestral Works 5: "A Sea of Stars" (booklet). Translated by Sinisalo, Susan. Arvo Volmer & Oulu Symphony Orchestra. Alba. p. 10–13. ABCD 211. OCLC 70821917
- Korhonen, Kimmo [in Finnish] (2013). Leevi Madetoja: Symphony No. 2 / Kullervo / Elegy (booklet). Translated by Mäntyjärvi, Jaakko. John Storgårds & Helsinki Philharmonic Orchestra. Ondine. p. 4–6. ODE 1212–2. OCLC 823893771
- Korhonen, Kimmo (2021). Scenes from the Kalevala: Klami / Sibelius / Madetoja / Pylkkänen (booklet). Translated by Barnett, Andrew. Dima Slobodeniouk & Lahti Symphony Orchestra. BIS. p. 4–8. BIS–2371. OCLC 1310081704

Journals and magazines

- Goss, Glenda Dawn (2003). "A Backdrop for Young Sibelius: The Intellectual Genesis of the Kullervo Symphony". 19th-Century Music. 27 (1). University of California Press: 48–73. JSTOR 10.1525/ncm.2003.27.1.48.

Newspaper articles (by date)

- BIS [Wasenius, Karl] [in Finnish] (15 October 1913). "Leevi Madetojas kompositionskonsert" [Leevi Madetoja's composition concert]. Hufvudstadsbladet (in Swedish). No. 281. p. 7.
- O. K. [????] (15 October 1913). "Leevi Madetojan sävellyskonsertti" [Leevi Madetoja's composition concert]. Helsingin Sanomat (in Finnish). No. 240. p. 6.
- R e. [Elmgren, Robert] [in Finnish] (15 October 1913). "Leevi Madetojas kompositionskonsert" [Leevi Madetoja's composition concert]. Nya Pressen (in Swedish). No. 237. p. 4.
- E. K. [Katila, Evert] [in Finnish] (16 October 1913). "Leevi Madetojan sävellyskonsertti" [Leevi Madetoja's composition concert]. Uusi Suometar (in Finnish). No. 241. p. 5.
