= Santeri Levas =

Finnish writer and photographer

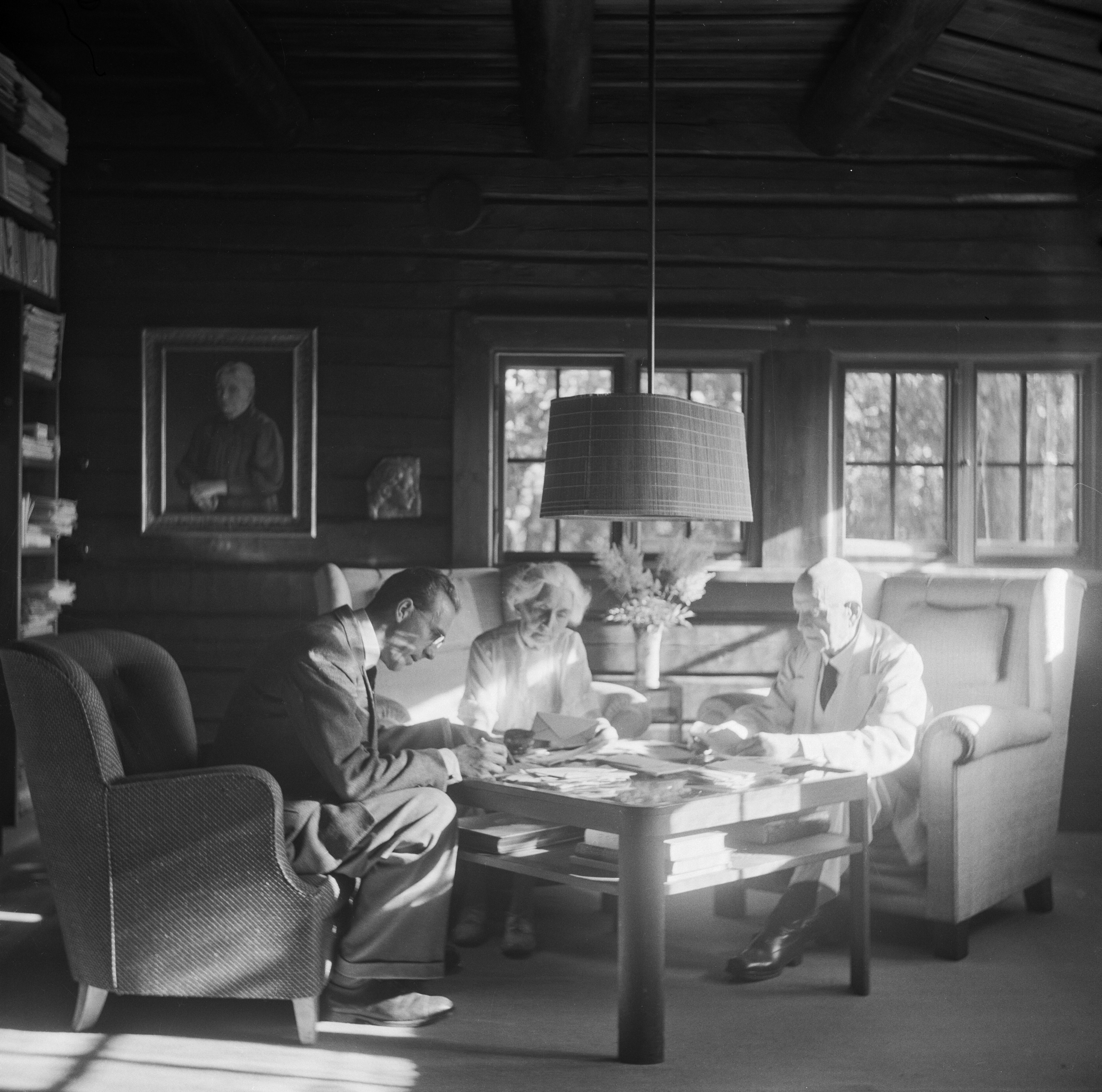
Santeri Levas (to the left) with Aino and Jean Sibelius in the 1940s, examining the daily mail in Ainola. Photograph by Levas.

Benno Alexander "Santeri" Levas (until 1936 Lehmann; 8 February 1899 – 10 March 1987) was a Finnish writer and photographer, best known for his books on the composer Jean Sibelius.

Santeri Levas was born in Helsinki, Grand Duchy of Finland, in 1899, to the family of Nicolai Lehmann and Hertta née Piispanen. His main career was in the service of Kansallis-Osake-Pankki (1923–1962) as a correspondence clerk and a departmental manager, but he started to publish both fact and fiction, first under pseudonyms, in the mid-1920s. Levas was educated a Master of Arts (1936) and a sworn translator.

Levas served as a long-time private secretary to Jean Sibelius, from 1938 until the composer's death in 1957. During their discussions, he was able to jot down unique material for a biography of the master, but it was agreed that the book should only be published after the death of the composer.

In 1945, however, Levas published a photographic book on the Sibelius residence, Ainola, in Järvenpää; separate editions were published in both Finnish and Swedish. The second edition, Jean Sibelius and His Home, from 1955 presented the text in four languages.

The main work of Levas, the two-volume biography of Sibelius, was first published in Finnish in 1957–1960, and translated into English as an abridged version, Sibelius: A Personal Portrait, in 1972. He also published a biography of German composers Clara and Robert Schumann and several travel books, observing and documenting life in the post-war Germany and Austria, among others.

In the 1940s–1950s Levas was a chairman of the Helsinki and later Finnish Photographic Society. He was also an honorary member of Fédération Internationale de l’Art Photographique and an Associate of the Royal Photographic Society (ARPS). His photographs and writings were published in Sweden, Germany, Austria and Switzerland.

Santeri Levas died at the age of 88 in Helsinki.

== Writings ==
- Syntymähoroskooppi: Astrologian alkeiskirja (Horoskoopin lukeminen). Mystica, Helsinki 1925 (as Benno A. Lehmann).
- Näkymätön käskijä ja muita kertomuksia. WSOY 1928 (as Benno A. Piispanen).
- Jean Sibelius ja hänen Ainolansa. Otava 1945.
- Jean Sibelius och hans hem. Schildt 1945.
- Kameran taidetta. Edited by Santeri Levas and Arvi Hanste. Kameraseura & WSOY 1946.
- Helsinki: valoa ja varjoa. Edited by Arvi Hanste, Santeri Levas and Veli Molander. WSOY 1950.
- Suuren säveltäjän rakkaus: Robert ja Clara Schumannin elämäntarina. WSOY 1952.
- Jättiläisten jäljissä: Autolla Itävallassa ja muuallakin. WSOY 1955.
- Jean Sibelius ja hänen Ainolansa – Jean Sibelius och hans hem – Jean Sibelius and His Home – Jean Sibelius und sein Heim. (2nd edition.) Otava 1955.
- Nuori Sibelius: Jean Sibelius, muistelma suuresta ihmisestä: ensimmäinen osa. WSOY 1957.
- Järvenpään mestari: Jean Sibelius, muistelma suuresta ihmisestä: toinen osa. WSOY 1960.
- Kultaisen saaren kevät: Kirja Mallorcasta ja sen rakastavaisista. WSOY 1963.
- Ihmisiä Itämeren aurinkosaarella: Tarua ja totta Gotlannista. WSOY 1966.
- Romanttinen reitti halki Saksan: Autolla Itämereltä Baijerin alpeille. WSOY 1971.
- Jean Sibelius. Tõlkinud L. Sarv ja L. Viiding. Eesti Raamat 1971.
- Sibelius: A Personal Portrait. Translated by Percy M. Young. J. M. Dent 1972.
- Jean Sibelius: Muistelma suuresta ihmisestä. WSOY 1986. (Combined edition.)

== Sources ==
- Liukkonen, Voitto (ed.): Suuri kansalaishakemisto II (p. 135). Kustannusosakeyhtiö Puntari 1967.
