= Hugh Ottaway =

British music critic

Hugh Ottaway (27 July 1925 – 6 November 1979) was a prominent British writer and lecturer on classical music.

Ottaway studied history at Exeter University (then the University of the South-West) from 1944. His career began as a teacher at Hanley Castle Grammar School where he taught Music and Art, freelance writer and from the 1950s as a presenter of musical talks on BBC Radio. His most significant contributions to music criticism were as a commentator on that portion of twentieth-century music which retained an allegiance to tonality; thus Nielsen, Shostakovich, Sibelius and William Walton featured largely in his output.

Ottaway was especially associated with British composers such as Edmund Rubbra and Robert Simpson, and a staunch supporter of the politically active Alan Bush. But David Scott has pointed out that he "was not limited by a nationalist outlook. His ability to view English composition in a broader context also made his reviews valuable".

Ottaway was active in the Campaign for Nuclear Disarmament and the Labour Party.

He died in Malvern, aged 54. An archive of his papers is held at the Bodleian Library in Oxford.

== Books ==
- Vaughan Williams (Novello Short Biographies; 1966)
- ‘Carl Nielsen’, ‘Prospect and Perspective’, chapter in Robert Simpson (ed). The Symphony, Vol.2 (1967, rev. 1972), pp. 268–77
- ‘The Enlightenment and the Revolution’, chapter in A. Robertson, D Stevens (ed.) The Pelican History of Music, 1968), pp. 11–96
- Sibelius (Novello Short Biographies; 1968)
- Vaughan Williams Symphonies (BBC Music Guides series; 1972 [reprinted 1977, 1980 and 1987]) ISBN 0-563-12242-0.
- William Walton (Novello Short Biographies; 1972, revised 1977)
- Shostakovich Symphonies (BBC Music Guides, No 39; 1978)
- Mozart (1979)
- Edmund Rubbra, an appreciation: Together with a complete catalogue of compositions to May 1981 (Lengnick; 1981)

== Articles ==
- ‘The Piano Music of John Ireland’, Monthly Musical Record 84 (1954), pp. 258–66
- 'Nielsen's Sixth Symphony'; The Musical Times, Vol. 95, No. 1337 (Jul., 1954), pp. 362–363
- —— (July 1957). "Vaughan Williams's Eighth Symphony". Music & Letters. 38 (3): 213–225. doi:10.1093/ml/xxxviii.3.213. JSTOR 730270. (subscription required)
- 'Clues and Keys' - Hugh Ottaway on the music of Robert Simpson'; The Listener, 21 May 1970
- ‘Rubbra’s Symphonies’, Musical Times 112 (1971), pp. 430–32, 549–52
- Review: 'Simpson's New Symphonies'; Tempo (New Ser.), No. 105 (Jun., 1973), pp. 53–54
