= My Own Land =

Patriotic cantata by Jean Sibelius (1918)

- Cantata by Jean Sibelius
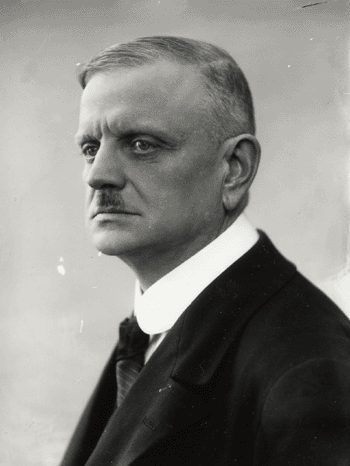
- The composer (c. 1918)
- Native name: Oma maa
- Opus: 92
- Text: Oma maa; by Kallio
- Language: Finnish
- Composed: 1918
- Duration: 12 mins.

Premiere
- Date: 25 October 1918
- Location: Helsinki, Finland
- Conductor: Armas Maasalo
- Performers: Helsinki Philharmonic Orchestra; Helsinki Youth League

My Own Land (in Finnish: Oma maa; occasionally translated to English as Our Native Land), Op. 92, is a single-movement, patriotic cantata for mixed choir and orchestra written in 1918 by the Finnish composer Jean Sibelius. The piece, which is a setting of Kallio's (a pseudonym for Samuli Kustaa Bergh) Finnish-language poem of the same name, is chronologically the sixth of Sibelius's nine orchestral cantatas; in particular, it belongs to the series of four "little known, but beautiful" cantatas from the composer's mature period that also includes Song of the Earth (Op. 93, 1919), Hymn of the Earth (Op. 95, 1920), and Väinämöinen's Song (Op. 110, 1926). My Own Land premiered on 25 October 1918 in Helsinki with Armas Maasalo conducting the Helsinki Youth League (the predecessor to the Finnish National Chorus)—the commissioning ensemble and dedicatee—and the Helsinki Philharmonic Orchestra.

== Instrumentation ==
My Own Land is scored for the following instruments and voices, organized by family (vocalists, woodwinds, brass, percussion, and strings):

- Mixed choir (SATB)
- 2 flutes, 2 oboes, 2 clarinets (in B♭), and 2 bassoons
- 4 horns (in F), 2 trumpets (in B♭), and 3 trombones
- Timpani and glockenspiel
- Violins (I and II), violas, cellos, and double basses

== History ==
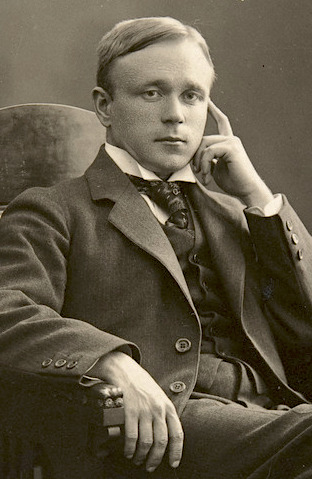
My Own Land, which Sibelius composed during the civil war, was premiered by Armas Maasalo in 1918.

A map indicating the division between Finnish Socialist Workers' Republic (in red) and White Finland in early 1918

The cantata resulted from a commission by the "Helsinki Youth League", (Note: Andrew Barnett writes that the Finnish name for the ensemble in 1918 was the Helsingin Kansallismielisen Nuorison Sekakuorolaulajat, or 'Helsinki Nationalist Youth Mixed Chorus'.) a youth choir that eventually became the Finnish National Chorus (Kansallis-Kuoro); the ensemble desired from Sibelius a new work that it could perform in 1918 to celebrate its tenth anniversary. Sibelius at the time was staying in Helsinki at Lapinlahti (the hospital at which his brother, Christian, was the medical superintendent), having abandoned Ainola as a precaution in mid-February due to risks associated with the Finnish Civil War. (On 28 January, the Soviet-aided Reds had taken the capital and established a socialist state; on 12–13 February, they had searched the home of Sibelius, who was a known White sympathizer.)

The war led to food shortages and inflation, and Sibelius desperately needed money. It was in these "inauspicious circumstances" that he agreed composed the new cantata (as Sibelius's biographer, Erik Tawaststjerna, notes: "What other course was there but to borrow or beg—and compose?"), although the National Chorus offered him a mere 1,000 Finnish marks, which the composer was to return upon selling the cantata to a publisher. (In his diary, Sibelius grumbled: "In other words, they get it for nothing. But I haven't the heart to say no".)

Sibelius chose to set the poem Oma maa (1832) by the Finnish poet Kallio (a pseudonym for Samuli Kustaa Bergh), which had become dear to him during the war. It is a patriotic text—one of "finest achievements of Finnish lyrical poetry", pre-Kivi—that speaks of one's longing for Finland and references Finnish mythology. For example, in the first stanza, Kallio writes:

Original Finnish

Vallan autuas se, jok' ei nuorena sortunu maaltaan,
hyljetty onnensa kans' urhoin haudoilta pois!
Ei sopis miehenä näin mun nuhdella taivahan töitä,
mutta mun syämeni taas tahtoopi huoata ees.
Kun minä muistan sen yön, jona rakkailta rannoilta luovuin,
nousevat silmiini nyt vieläkin viljavat veet.
Ei mun mielestän' ei mee Pohjolan tunturit, joilla
lasna ma kuuntelin kuin sampo ja kantelo soi.

English translation (Note: This translation is from the liner notes to the recording by Osmo Vänskä, the Lahti Symphony Orchestra, and the Jubilate Choir.)

Fortunate is he who in youth was not driven from his country,
Abandoned by fortune, far from his heroes' graves!
As a man it does not befit me to question heaven's deeds,
But my heart wishes once more, at least, to sigh.
When I remember the night when I left the shores I loved,
Even now many a tear moistens my eye.
No, I cannot forget the hills of the Northland, where
As a child I heard the music of the sampo and kantele.

Indeed, Sibelius spoke of his composition as a "song of praise to nature and the white nights of Finland".

Sibelius completed the cantata in late March 1918, around the time that the Whites retook Helsinki. (The civil war subsequently ended in May.) The piece premiered months later on 25 October 1918 in Helsinki, with the Finnish composer Armas Maasalo conducting the National Chorus—its dedicatee—and the Helsinki Philharmonic Orchestra. Sibelius was in attendance, a trip that had cost him about 5,000 marks. (As he recorded on 29 October in his daiary: "Begin to compose small pieces to refill the coffers. Can't understand myself. Got back my old appetite and let things go".) The critics gave the cantata mixed reviews: Evert Katila praised the piece as a "convincing expression for the beauty of Finland", while Leevi Madetoja (Sibelius's former pupil) thought that "the many-faceted orchestral texture could... have been given with greater clarity".

A few modern-day commentators, however, have found much to like in My Own Land. For example, Guy Rickards has labeled the cantata a "minor masterpiece", although it "does not sound particularly Finnish in character". Calling My Own Land "dignified and euphonious" in its "magical evocation of wintry nights with Aurora borealis and the white nights of midsummer", Robert Layton has argued that the cantata "deserves to be heard more often outside of Finland". Vesa Sirén has described the cantata as "confident and free from the most defiant patriotism. It is as if Sibelius was already trying to lead the divided nation towards a more moderate future". Finally, describing the late cantatas as a whole, Pierre-Yves Lascar argues that they "demonstrate more talent than genuine inspiration... rarely if ever [do they] equal the genius of the symphonies or the symphonic poems"; nevertheless, they "charm the listener" and are "beautiful works".

== Discography ==
The Finnish conductor Paavo Berglund and the Helsinki Philharmonic Orchestra made the world premiere studio recording of My Own Land in June 1985 for EMI Classics; they were joined by the YL Male Voice Choir (then the Helsinki University Chorus) The table below lists this and other commercially available recordings:

No.	Conductor	Orchestra	Chorus	Rec. (Note: Refers to the year in which the performers recorded the work; this may not be the same as the year in which the recording was first released to the general public.)	Time (Note: All runtimes are official, as printed on CD or LP liner notes.)	Venue	Label	Ref.
1	Paavo Berglund	Helsinki Philharmonic Orchestra	Helsinki University Chorus	1985	12:13	Kulttuuritalo	EMI Classics	(Note: P. Berglund—Warner (9029586915) 2017)
2	Eri Klas	Finnish National Opera Orchestra	Finnish National Opera Chorus	1990	12:00	Roihuvuori Church	Ondine	(Note: E. Klas—Ondine (ODE 754-2) 1990)
3	Osmo Vänskä	Lahti Symphony Orchestra	Jubilate Choir	2001	13:26	Sibelius Hall	BIS	(Note: O. Vänskä—BIS (CD–1265) 2004)
4	Paavo Järvi	Estonian National Symphony Orchestra	Estonian National Male Choir; Ellerhein Girls' Choir	2002	11:55	Estonia Concert Hall	Virgin Classics	(Note: P. Järvi—Virgin Classics (7243 5 45589 2 4) 2003)

== Notes, references, and sources ==
Notes

Sources

- Barnett, Andrew (2005). Sibelius: Song of the Earth (booklet). Osmo Vänskä, Lahti Symphony Orchestra, & Dominante Choir. BIS. BIS CD-1365. OCLC 62255940
- Barnett, Andrew (2007). Sibelius. New Haven: Yale University Press. ISBN 978-0-300-11159-0.
- Dahlström, Fabian [in Swedish] (2003). Jean Sibelius: Thematisch-bibliographisches Verzeichnis seiner Werke [Jean Sibelius: A Thematic Bibliographic Index of His Works] (in German). Wiesbaden: Breitkopf & Härtel. ISBN 3-7651-0333-0.
- Lascar, Pierre-Yves (2003). Sibelius: Cantatas (booklet). Paavo Järvi, Estonian National Symphony Orchestra, & Estonian National Male Choir. Virgin Classics. 7243 5 45589 2 4. OCLC 52897195
- Layton, Robert (1993) [1965]. Sibelius. (The Master Musicians Series) (4th ed.). New York: Schirmer Books. ISBN 0028713222.
- Okkonen, Jukka (1990). Sibelius: Cantatas (booklet). Eri Klas, Finnish National Opera Orchestra and Chorus. Ondine. ODE 754-2. OCLC 26017670
- Rickards, Guy (1997). Jean Sibelius. (20th-century Composers Series). London: Phaidon. ISBN 9780714835815.
- Sirén, Vesa (2005). "Works for Choir and Orchestra". Sibelius.fi.
- Tawaststjerna, Erik (2008) [1978/1988; trans. 1997]. Sibelius: Volume III, 1914–1957. (Robert Layton, English translation). London: Faber and Faber. ISBN 9780571247745.
