= Hymn of the Earth =

Patriotic cantata by Jean Sibelius (1920)

- Cantata by Jean Sibelius
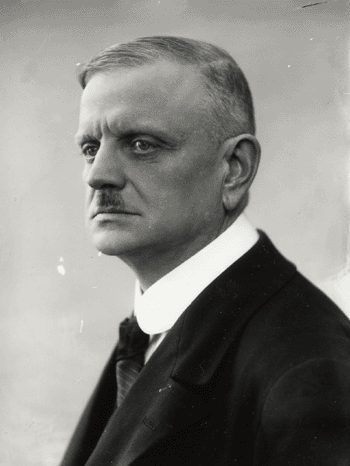
- The composer (c. 1918)
- Native name: Maan virsi
- Opus: 95
- Text: Maan virsi; by Eino Leino
- Language: Finnish
- Composed: 1919–1920
- Duration: 8 mins.

Premiere
- Date: 4 April 1920
- Location: Helsinki, Finland
- Conductor: Heikki Klemetti
- Performers: Helsinki Philharmonic Orchestra; Suomen Laulu

Hymn of the Earth (in Finnish: Maan virsi), Op. 95, is a single-movement, patriotic cantata for mixed choir and orchestra written from 1919 to 1920 by Finnish composer Jean Sibelius. The piece, which is a setting of the Finnish author Eino Leino's Finnish-language poem of the same name, is chronologically the eighth of Sibelius's nine orchestral cantatas; in particular, it belongs to the series of four "little known, but beautiful" cantatas from the composer's mature period that also includes My Own Land (Op. 92, 1918), Song of the Earth (Op. 93, 1919), and Väinämöinen's Song (Op. 110, 1926). Hymn of the Earth premiered on 4 April 1920 in Helsinki, with Heikki Klemetti conducting the Helsinki Philharmonic Orchestra and his choir, Suomen Laulu.

== Instrumentation ==
Hymn of the Earth is scored for the following instruments and voices, organized by family (vocalists, woodwinds, brass, percussion, and strings):

- Mixed choir (SATB)
- 2 flutes, 2 oboes, 2 clarinets (in B♭), and 2 bassoons
- 4 horns (in F), 2 trumpets (in B♭), and 3 trombones
- Timpani
- Violins (I and II), violas, cellos, and double basses

== History ==
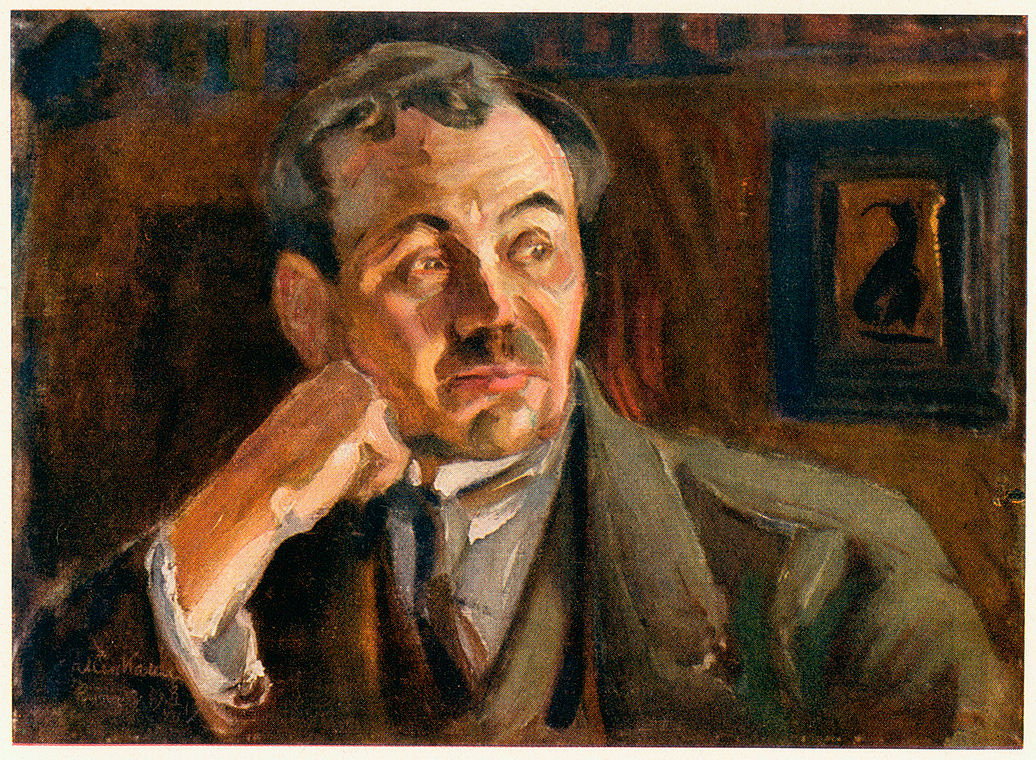
A 1917 painting (by Akseli Gallen-Kallela) of Eino Leino, whose poem Sibelius set in Hymn of the Earth.

The cantata resulted from a commission by the Finnish choral conductor Heikki Klemetti, who had founded the mixed choir Suomen Laulu in 1900 and desired from Sibelius a new work that the ensemble could perform in the spring of 1920 to celebrate its twentieth anniversary. Sibelius, however, was unenthused, writing in his diary in January 1919: "And then there's the promise I made Klemetti for a work for Suomen Laulu. He is by no means one of my 'admirers'. It annoys me that he only wants to use my name as a decoration". By late December 1919, however, Sibelius's delay tactics ceased and he began work on the piece for Klemetti.

Although Sibelius had planned to set Suomenmaa by the Finnish poet Aleksis Kivi, he settled on Maan virsi by Eino Leino. It is a patriotic text that celebrates Finland, as well as the natural world. For example, in the third stanza, Leino writes:

Original Finnish

Maa! sulle kiitosta kantele soikoon,
suvilaulu Suomen,
tuoksussa juhannuskoivun ja tuomen,
rikkaana riemuita virtemme voikoon,
elonhuolet voittaa,
kauneuden korkean sydänkieltä soittaa.

English translation (Note: This translation, by John Skinner, is from the liner notes (pg. 28) to the recording by Eri Klas and the Finnish National Opera. (E. Klas—Ondine (ODE 754-2) 1990))

Earth! Let the kantele sing thee its thanks,
Finland’s summer song,
In the scent of the midsummer birch and hawthorn,
Rich may our streams rejoice,
Overcoming the cares of life,
Sounding the inner voice of high beauty.

Sibelius completed the cantata in late January 1920; it premiered a few months later on 4 April 1920 (Easter Sunday) in Helsinki, with Klemetti—its dedicatee—conducting Suomen Laulu and the Helsinki Philharmonic Orchestra.

== Discography ==
The Estonian conductor Eri Klas and the Finnish National Opera Orchestra and Chorus made the world premiere studio recording of the Hymn of the Earth in 1990 for Ondine. The table below lists this and other commercially available recordings:

No.	Conductor	Orchestra	Chorus	Rec. (Note: Refers to the year in which the performers recorded the work; this may not be the same as the year in which the recording was first released to the general public.)	Time (Note: All runtimes are official, as printed on CD or LP liner notes.)	Venue	Label	Ref.
1	Eri Klas	Finnish National Opera Orchestra	Finnish National Opera Chorus	1990	7:36	Roihuvuori Church	Ondine	(Note: E. Klas—Ondine (ODE 754-2) 1990)
2	Paavo Järvi	Estonian National Symphony Orchestra	Estonian National Male Choir	2002	7:41	Estonia Concert Hall	Virgin Classics	(Note: P. Järvi—Virgin Classics (7243 5 45589 2 4) 2003)
3	Osmo Vänskä	Lahti Symphony Orchestra	Dominante Choir	2004	5:47	Sibelius Hall	BIS	(Note: O. Vänskä—BIS (CD–1365) 2005)

== Notes, references, and sources ==
=== Sources ===
- Barnett, Andrew (2005). Sibelius: Song of the Earth (booklet). Osmo Vänskä, Lahti Symphony Orchestra, & Dominante Choir. BIS. BIS CD-1365. OCLC 62255940
- Barnett, Andrew (2007). Sibelius. Yale University Press. ISBN 9780300111590.
- Dahlström, Fabian [in Swedish] (2003). Jean Sibelius: Thematisch-bibliographisches Verzeichnis seiner Werke [Jean Sibelius: A Thematic Bibliographic Index of His Works] (in German). Wiesbaden: Breitkopf & Härtel. ISBN 3-7651-0333-0.
- Lascar, Pierre-Yves (2003). Sibelius: Cantatas (booklet). Paavo Järvi, Estonian National Symphony Orchestra, & Estonian National Male Choir. Virgin Classics. 7243 5 45589 2 4. OCLC 52897195
- Okkonen, Jukka (1990). Sibelius: Cantatas (booklet). Eri Klas, Finnish National Opera Orchestra and Chorus. Ondine. ODE 754-2. OCLC 26017670
