= The Origin of Fire =

Patriotic cantata by Jean Sibelius (1902/1910)

- Cantata by Jean Sibelius
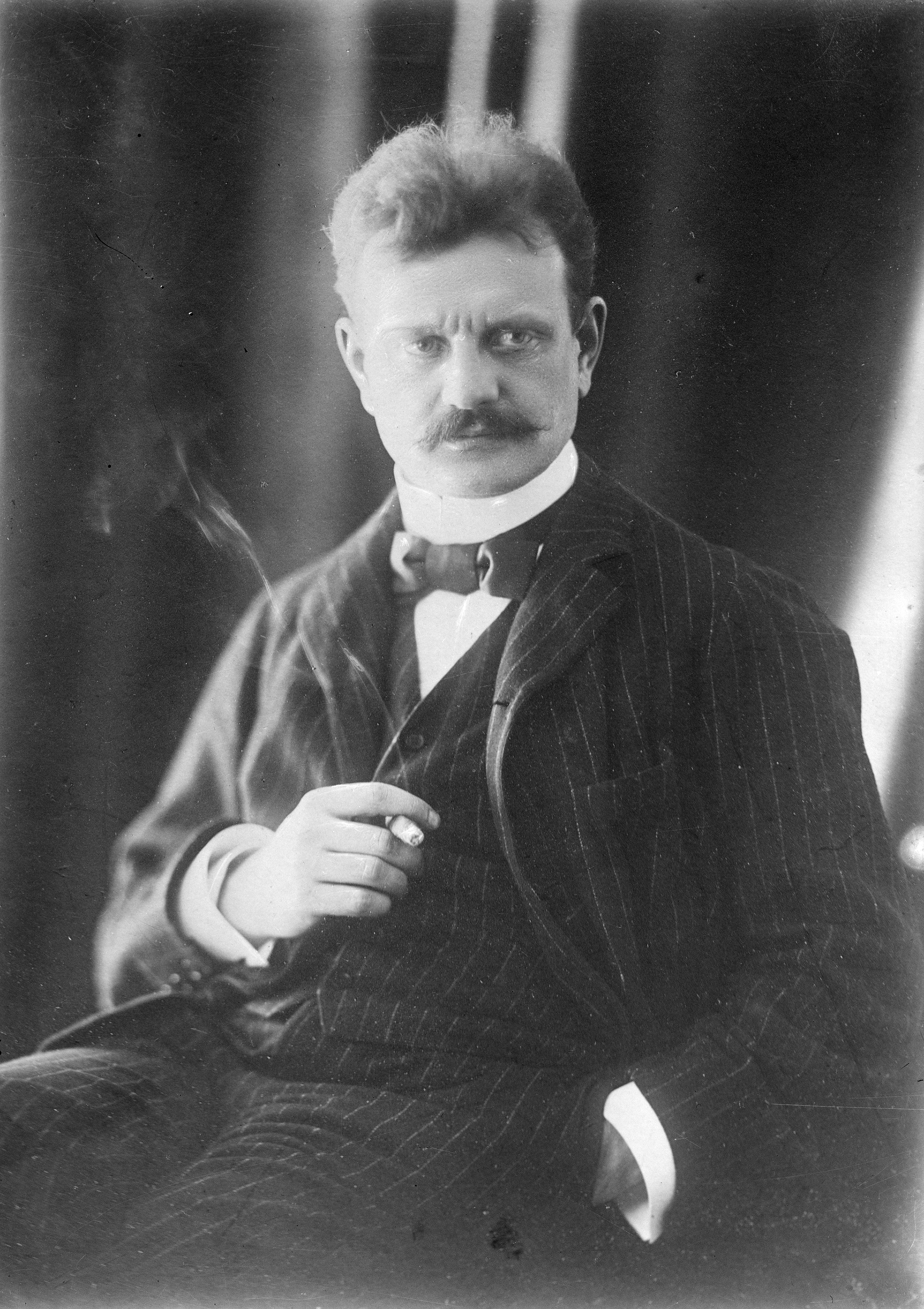
- The composer (c. 1902)
- Native name: Tulen synty
- Opus: 32
- Text: Kalevala (Runo XLVII)
- Language: Finnish
- Composed: 1902, rev. 1910
- Publisher: Breitkopf & Härtel (1912)
- Duration: 10 mins. (orig. 15 mins.)

Premiere
- Date: 9 April 1902
- Location: Helsinki, Grand Duchy of Finland
- Conductor: Jean Sibelius
- Performers: Helsinki Philharmonic Society; Abraham Ojanperä (baritone)

The Origin of Fire (in Finnish: Tulen synty), Op. 32, is a single-movement, patriotic cantata for baritone, male choir, and orchestra written in 1902 by the Finnish composer Jean Sibelius. The piece, which is a setting of Runo XLVII (lines 41–110) of the Kalevala, Finland's national epic, is chronologically the fourth of Sibelius's nine orchestral cantatas.

It premiered on 9 April 1902 at the opening of the Finnish National Theatre, conducted by the composer. It was later revised in 1910. Some of the sketches for the piece can be related back to 1893 to 1894.

== Instrumentation ==
The revised version of The Origin of Fire is scored for the following instruments and voices, organized by family (vocalists, woodwinds, brass, percussion, and strings):

- Baritone and male choir (TTBB)
- 2 flutes, 2 oboes, 2 clarinets, and 2 bassoons
- 4 horns, 2 trumpets, 3 trombones, and tuba
- Timpani, glockenspiel, bass drum, cymbals, and triangle
- Violins (I and II), violas, cellos, and double basses

The original version of the piece is scored identically, with the exception that triangle is omitted.

== Discography ==
The American conductor Thor Johnson and the Cincinnati Symphony Orchestra made the world premiere studio recording of The Origin of Fire in 1953 for Remington Records (later reissued by Varèse Sarabande); they were joined by the Finnish baritone Sulo Saarits and the YL Male Voice Choir (then the Helsinki University Chorus). The sortable table below lists this and other commercially available recordings:

No.	Conductor	Orchestra	Baritone	Chorus	Rec. (Note: Refers to the year in which the performers recorded the work; this may not be the same as the year in which the recording was first released to the general public.)	Time (Note: All runtimes are official, as printed on CD or LP liner notes.)	Venue	Label	Ref.
1	Thor Johnson	Cincinnati Symphony Orchestra	Sulo Saarits	YL Male Voice Choir (1)	1953	8:47	?	Varèse Sarabande	(Note: T. Johnson—Varèse Sarabande (VC 81041) 1978)
2	Paavo Berglund	Helsinki Philharmonic Orchestra	Jorma Hynninen	YL Male Voice Choir (2); Estonian National Male Choir	1985	8:34	Kulttuuritalo	EMI	(Note: P. Berglund—EMI (CDS 7 47496 8) 1985)
3	Neeme Järvi	Gothenburg Symphony Orchestra	Sauli Tiilikainen	Laulun Ystävät Male Choir	1985	9:54	Gothenburg Concert Hall	BIS	(Note: N. Järvi—BIS (CD–314) 1986)
4	Osmo Vänskä (1)	Lahti Symphony Orchestra (1)	Tommi Hakala (1)	YL Male Voice Choir (3)	2005	9:03	Sibelius Hall	BIS	(Note: O. Vänskä—BIS (CD–1525) 2007)
†	Osmo Vänskä (2)	Lahti Symphony Orchestra (2)	Tommi Hakala (2)	YL Male Voice Choir (4)	2005	11:20	Sibelius Hall	BIS	

† = original version (1902)

== Notes, references, and sources ==
Notes

Sources

- Barnett, Andrew (2007). Sibelius. New Haven: Yale University Press. ISBN 978-0-300-11159-0.
- Dahlström, Fabian [in Swedish] (2003). Jean Sibelius: Thematisch-bibliographisches Verzeichnis seiner Werke [Jean Sibelius: A Thematic Bibliographic Index of His Works] (in German). Wiesbaden: Breitkopf & Härtel. ISBN 3-7651-0333-0.
