= Väinämöinen's Song =

Patriotic cantata by Jean Sibelius (1926)

- Cantata by Jean Sibelius
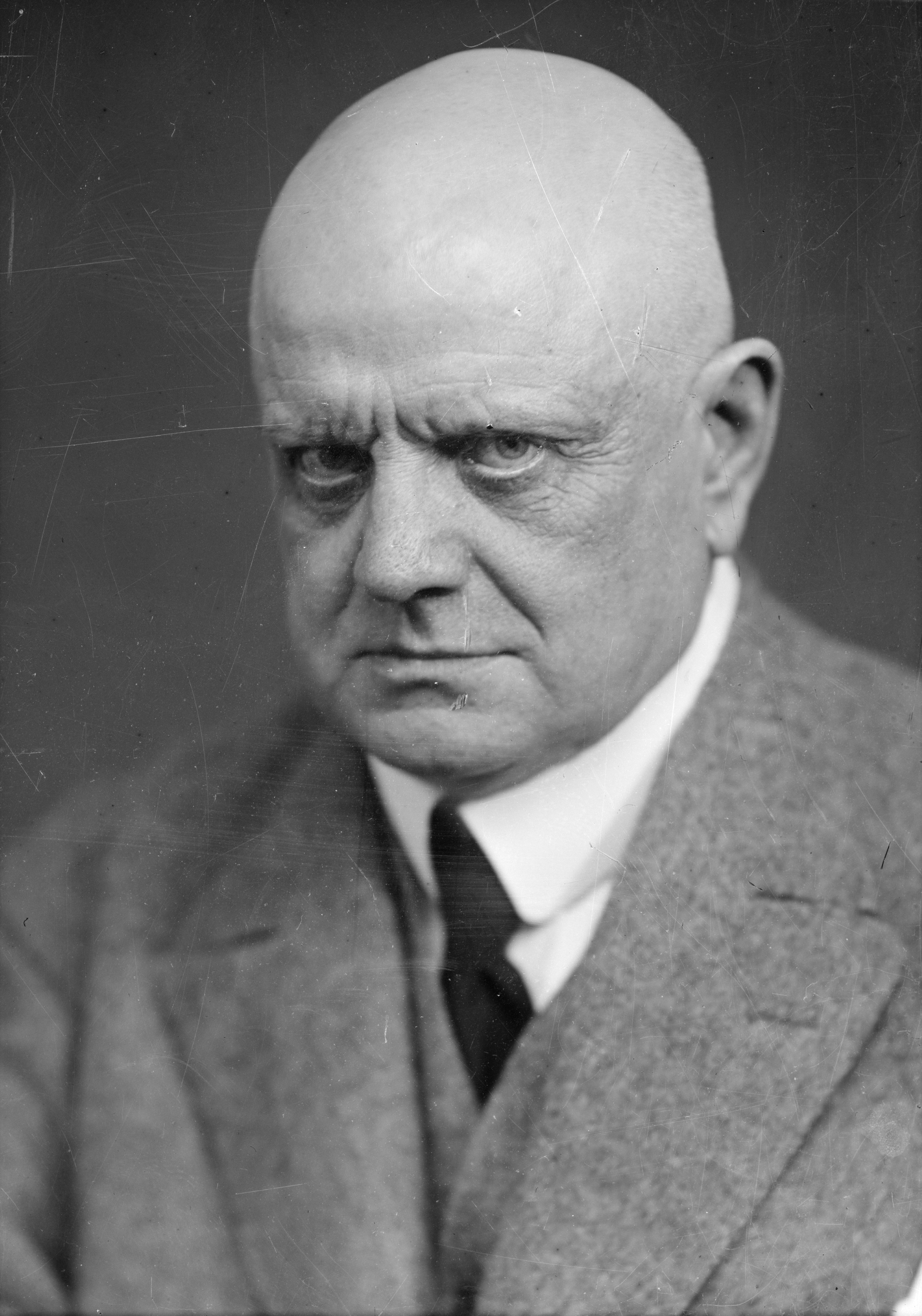
- The composer (c. 1927)
- Native name: Väinön virsi
- Opus: 110
- Text: Kalevala (Runo XLIII)
- Language: Finnish
- Composed: 1926
- Duration: 11 mins.

Premiere
- Date: 28 June 1926
- Location: Sortavala, Finland
- Conductor: Robert Kajanus

Väinämöinen's Song (in Finnish: Väinön virsi; sometimes translated to English simply as Väinö's Song), Op. 110, is a single-movement, patriotic cantata for mixed choir and orchestra written in 1926 by the Finnish composer Jean Sibelius. The piece, which is a setting of Runo XLIII (lines 385–434) of the Kalevala, Finland's national epic, is chronologically the final of Sibelius's nine orchestral cantatas; in particular, it belongs to the series of four "little known, but beautiful" cantatas from the composer's mature period that also includes My Own Land (Op. 92, 1918), Song of the Earth (Op. 93, 1919), and Hymn of the Earth (Op. 95, 1920). Väinämöinen's Song premiered on 28 June 1926 in Sortavala, Finland.

== Instrumentation ==
Väinämöinen's Song is scored for the following instruments and voices, organized by family (vocalists, woodwinds, brass, percussion, and strings):

- Mixed choir (SATB)
- 2 flutes, 2 oboes, 2 clarinets (in B♭), and 2 bassoons
- 4 horns (in F), 3 trumpets (in B♭), and 3 trombones
- Timpani, bass drum, triangle, and glockenspiel
- Violins (I and II), violas, cellos, and double basses

The cantata premiered on 26 June 1926 at a singing festival in Sortavala (then still part of Finland), with the Finnish conductor Robert Kajanus conducting.

== History ==
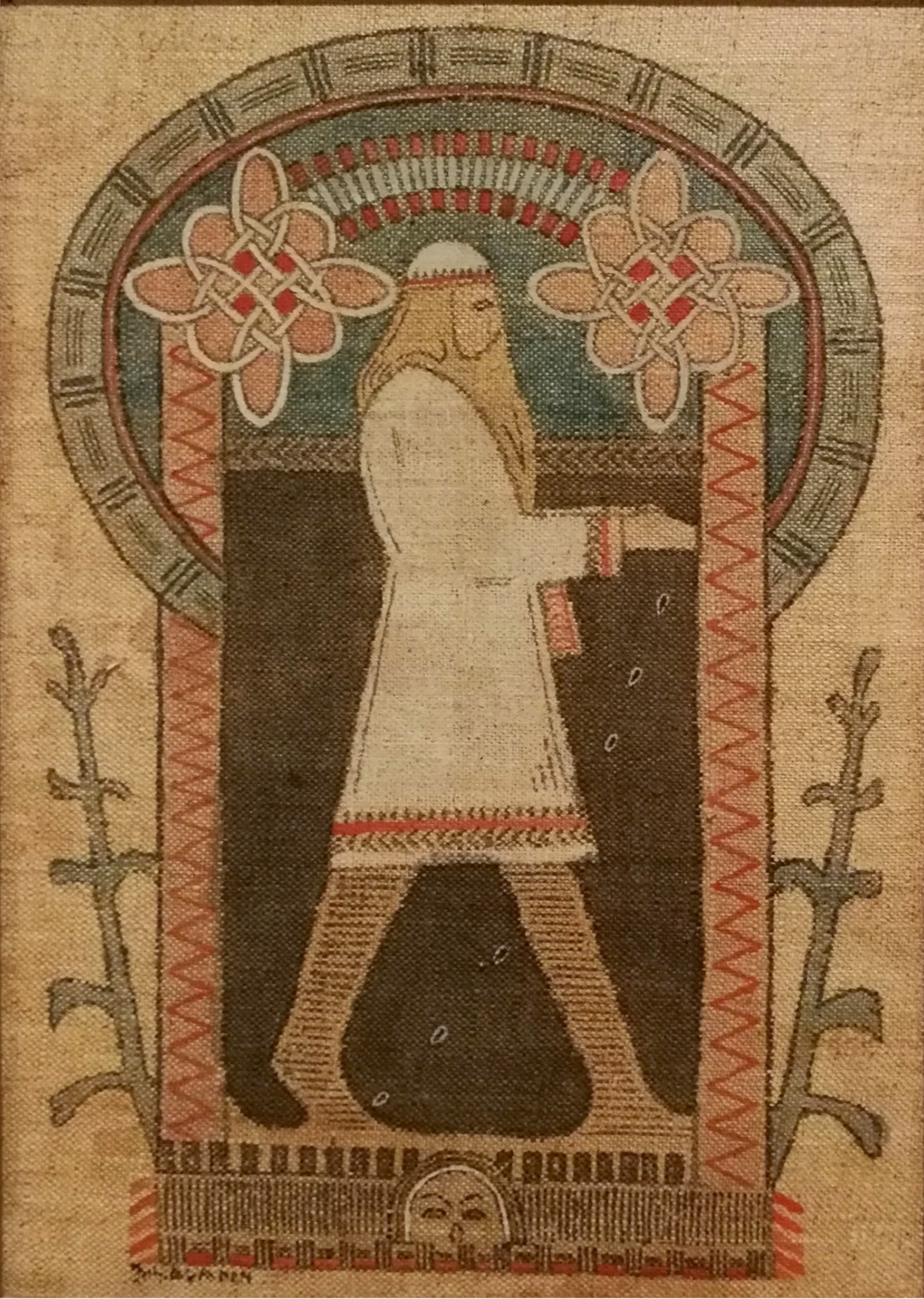
Sibelius's cantata tells a story from the Kalevala in which Väinämöinen collects the shards of the sampo that have washed upon the beach.

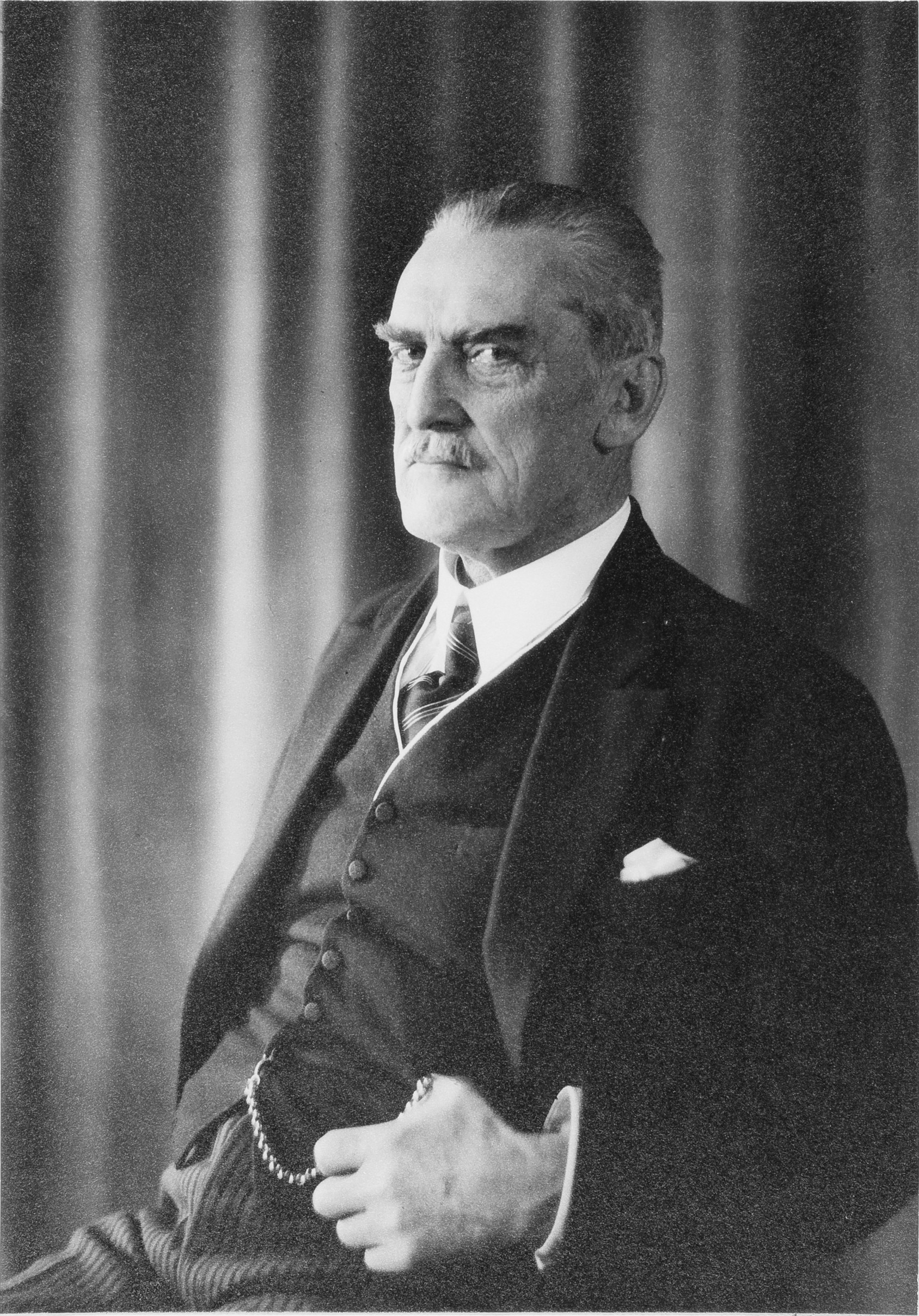
Robert Kajanus, Sibelius's long-time interpreter, conducted the premiere of Väinämöinen's Song in 1926.

== Text ==
Original Finnish

"Ole puolla poikiesi,
aina lastesi apuna,
aina yöllisnä tukena,
päivällisnä vartijana,
vihoin päivän paistamatta,
vihoin kuun kumottamatta,
vihoin tuulen tuulematta,
vihoin saamatta satehen,
pakkasen palelematta,
kovan ilman koskematta!

"Aita rautainen rakenna,
kivilinna liitättele
ympäri minun eloni,
kahen puolen kansoani,
maasta saaen taivosehen,
taivosesta maahan asti,
asukseni, ainokseni,
tuekseni, turvakseni [...]"

English translation (Note: This translation, by W. F. Kirby, is from the liner notes to the recording by Osmo Vänskä, the Lahti Symphony Orchestra, and the Dominante Choir.)

'O protect thy sons for ever,
May'st thou always aid thy children,
Guard them always in the night-time,
And protect them in the daytime,
Lest the sun should cease from shining,
Lest the moon should cease from beaming,
Lest the winds should cease from blowing,
Lest the rain should cease from falling,
Lest the Frost should come and freeze us,
And the evil weather harm us!

'Build thou up a fence of iron,
And of stone a castle build us,
Round the spot where I am dwelling,
And round both sides of my people,
Build it up from earth to heaven,
Build it down to earth from heaven,
As my own, my lifelong dwelling,
As my refuge and protection [...]'

== Discography ==
The Estonian conductor Eri Klas and the Finnish National Opera Orchestra and Chorus made the world premiere studio recording of the Väinämöinen's Song in 1990 for Ondine. The table below lists this and other commercially available recordings:

No.	Conductor	Orchestra	Chorus	Rec. (Note: Refers to the year in which the performers recorded the work; this may not be the same as the year in which the recording was first released to the general public.)	Time (Note: All runtimes are official, as printed on CD or LP liner notes.)	Venue	Label	Ref.
1	Eri Klas	Finnish National Opera Orchestra	Finnish National Opera Chorus	1990	9:40	Roihuvuori Church	Ondine	(Note: E. Klas—Ondine (ODE 754-2) 1990)
2	Paavo Järvi	Estonian National Symphony Orchestra	Estonian National Male Choir; Ellerhein Girls' Choir	2002	8:42	Estonia Concert Hall	Virgin Classics	(Note: P. Järvi—Virgin Classics (7243 5 45589 2 4) 2003)
3	Osmo Vänskä	Lahti Symphony Orchestra	Dominante Choir	2004	8:53	Sibelius Hall	BIS	(Note: O. Vänskä—BIS (CD–1565) 2006)

== Notes, references, and sources ==
=== Sources ===
- Barnett, Andrew (2005). Sibelius: Song of the Earth (booklet). Osmo Vänskä, Lahti Symphony Orchestra, & Dominante Choir. BIS. BIS CD-1365. OCLC 62255940
- Barnett, Andrew (2007). Sibelius. Yale University Press. ISBN 9780300111590.
- Dahlström, Fabian [in Swedish] (2003). Jean Sibelius: Thematisch-bibliographisches Verzeichnis seiner Werke [Jean Sibelius: A Thematic Bibliographic Index of His Works] (in German). Wiesbaden: Breitkopf & Härtel. ISBN 3-7651-0333-0.
- Lascar, Pierre-Yves (2003). Sibelius: Cantatas (booklet). Paavo Järvi, Estonian National Symphony Orchestra, & Estonian National Male Choir. Virgin Classics. 7243 5 45589 2 4. OCLC 52897195
- Okkonen, Jukka (1990). Sibelius: Cantatas (booklet). Eri Klas, Finnish National Opera Orchestra and Chorus. Ondine. ODE 754-2. OCLC 26017670
