= Snöfrid =

Melodrama by Jean Sibelius

- Melodrama by Jean Sibelius
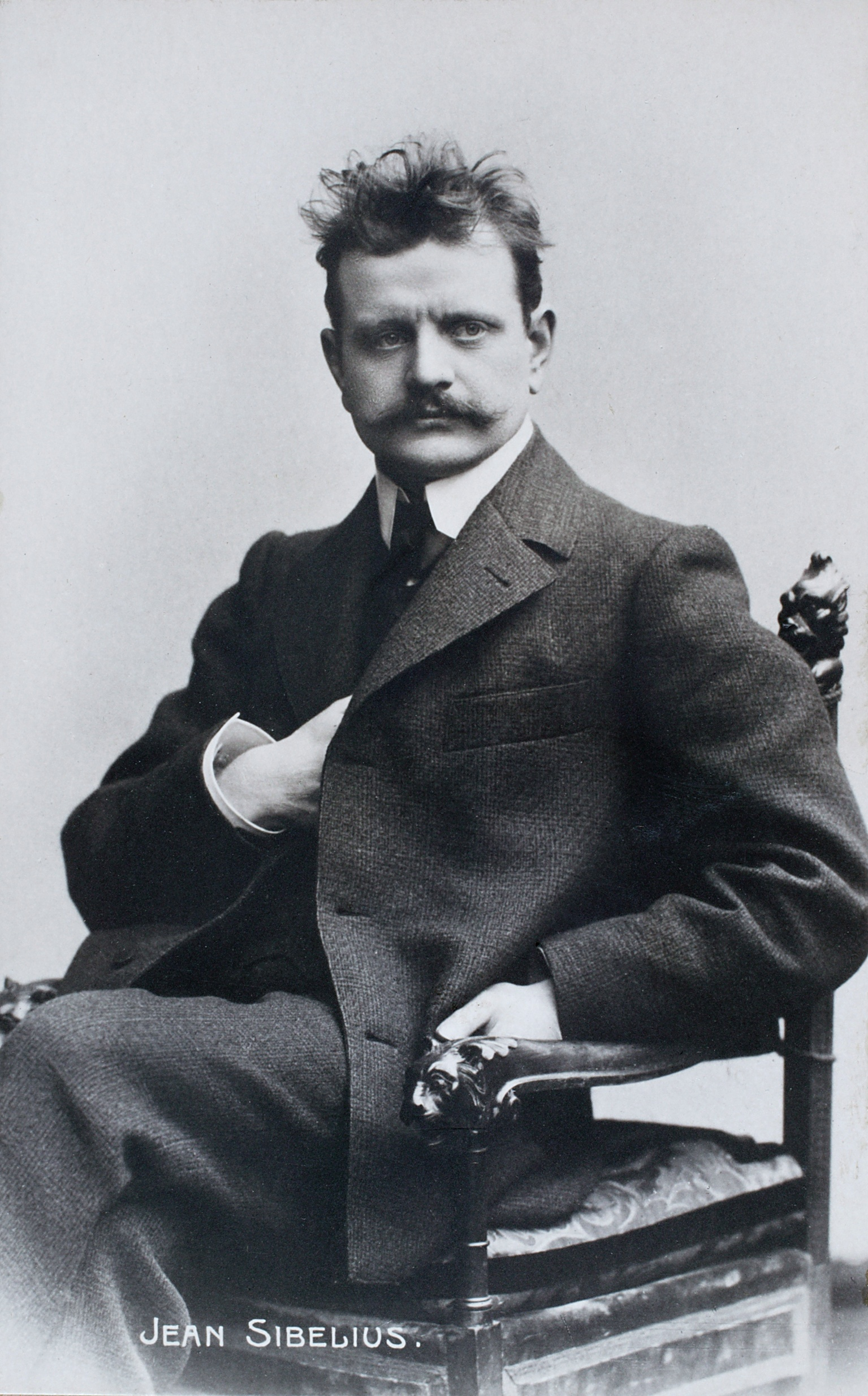
- The composer (c. 1900)
- Opus: 29
- Text: Snöfrid; by Viktor Rydberg
- Language: Swedish
- Composed: 1900
- Publisher: Hansen (1929)
- Duration: 13 mins.

Premiere
- Date: 20 October 1900
- Location: Helsinki, Grand Duchy of Finland
- Conductor: Jean Sibelius
- Performers: Helsinki Philharmonic Society; Katri Rautio (narrator)

Snöfrid, Op. 29, is a melodrama or "improvisation for narrator, mixed choir and orchestra" by Jean Sibelius. He completed it in 1900 on a text by Viktor Rydberg. It was first performed in Helsinki on 20 October 1900, with the Orchestra of the Helsinki Philharmonic Society, conducted by the composer.

== Instrumentation ==
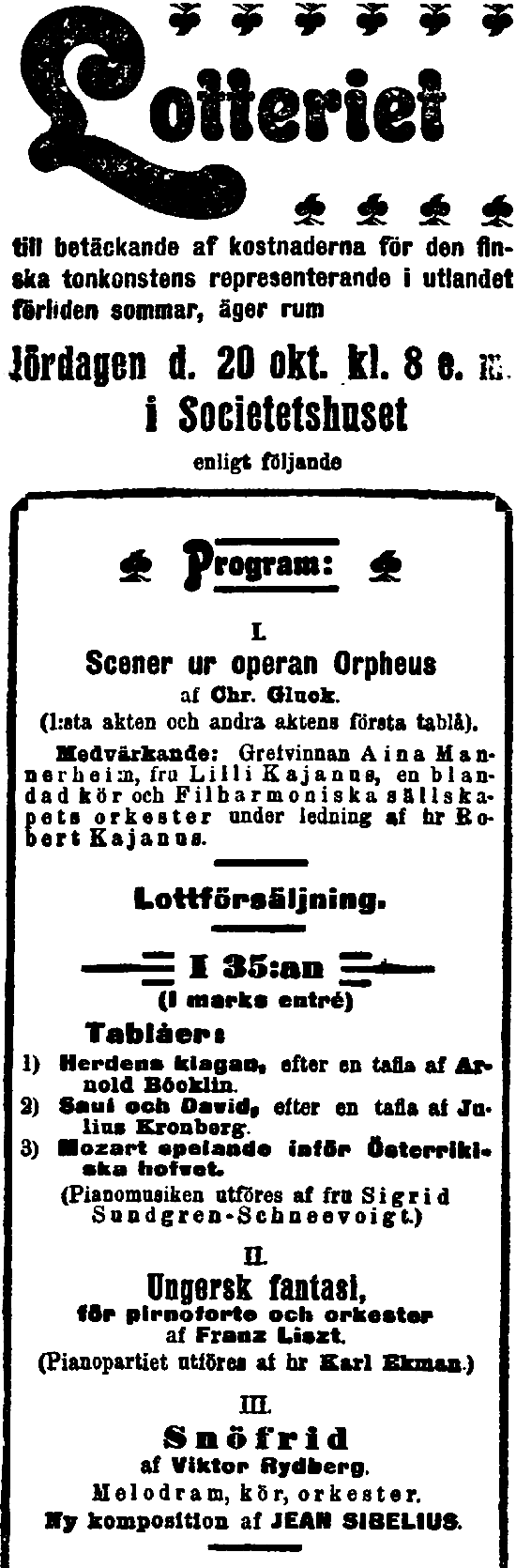
A newspaper advertisement (in Swedish) from Hufvudstadsbladet for the premiere of Snöfrid

Snöfrid is scored for the following instruments and voices, organized by family (vocalists, woodwinds, brass, percussion, and strings):

- Narrator and mixed choir (SATB)
- 2 flutes (one doubling piccolo), 1 oboe, 1 clarinet, 1 bass clarinet, and 1 bassoon
- 2 horns, 3 trumpets, and 1 trombone
- Timpani, glockenspiel, bass drum, and cymbals
- Violins (I and II), violas, cellos, and double basses

== History ==
The poem had previously been set in full by Wilhelm Stenhammar (Op. 5) in 1891. Sibelius composed the work in the fall of 1900 on a poem by Viktor Rydberg. He later noted: "I wrote Snöfrid more or less at one sitting after I came home from three days of lively celebrations." The plot on which it is based is inspired by old Scandinavian balladic stories. A female protagonist appeals to her compatriots, in particular a hero, to fight for freedom as a higher goal than fortune, fame, and pleasure. Sibelius was inspired by several works by Rydberg, including solo songs and Skogsrået (The Wood Nymph). He liked Rydberg's free verse, expressing both erotic and political ideas. The heroic element possibly appealed to his battles "with everybody and everything". Sibelius chose dramatic scenes from the poem, such as Snöfrid's "If you choose me, then you choose the tempest." The instrumental prelude depicts a storm at night, with whining strings, howling brass, thundering percussion, but "dominated by melodic and harmonic elements".

The work was first performed in Helsinki on 20 October 1900, with the Orchestra of the Helsinki Philharmonic Society, conducted by Sibelius. The occasion was a lottery to finance a tour of the orchestra to Paris. An unsigned review in the newspaper Päivälehti noted:

However, the most glorious piece of the whole evening was the last work in the programme, Sibelius's latest composition, a melodrama set to the words of Viktor Rydberg's "Snöfrid". ... This most recent of Sibelius's products marks a concrete advance in every respect, both as regards its warm, harmonious atmosphere and the use of visual arts and choir. The work as a whole makes such a warm, heartfelt impression and feels so lucid and inspired that it is indisputably one of Sibelius's masterpieces. Hopefully it will soon be performed again."

Later, Sibelius composed the last movement on a different text, Volter Kilpi's Ylistys taiteelle. This version was first performed on 9 April 1902.

== Discography ==
The Estonian conductor Eri Klas and the Finnish National Opera Orchestra and Chorus made the world premiere studio recording of the Snöfrid in 1990 for Ondine; the narrator was the Finnish-Swedish actress Stina Rautelin. The table below lists this and other commercially available recordings:

No.	Conductor	Orchestra	Chorus	Narrator	Rec. (Note: Refers to the year in which the performers recorded the work; this may not be the same as the year in which the recording was first released to the general public.)	Time (Note: All runtimes are official, as printed on CD or LP liner notes.)	Venue	Label	Ref.
1	Eri Klas	Finnish National Opera Orchestra	Finnish National Opera Chorus	Stina Rautelin	1990	12:31	Roihuvuori Church	Ondine	(Note: E. Klas—Ondine (ODE 754-2) 1990)
2	Osmo Vänskä	Lahti Symphony Orchestra	Jubilate Choir	Stina Ekblad	2001	14:15	Sibelius Hall	BIS	(Note: O. Vänskä—BIS (CD–1265) 2004)
3	Paavo Järvi	Estonian National Symphony Orchestra	Estonian National Male Choir	Sofia Joons	2002	11:23	Estonia Concert Hall	Virgin Classics	(Note: P. Järvi—Virgin Classics (7243 5 45589 2 4) 2003)

A review notes that the "galloping early pages" are reminiscent of the Second Symphony and continues:

It is an unusual piece with two turbulently majestic and sometimes idyllic choral sections framing an episode in which a female narrator speaks as the heroine Snöfrid. The orchestral fabric behind the closely-recorded voice is minimal (a soft dark breathing pulse from the brass) similar in approach to much of the instrumental underpinning in Luonnotar.
