= Song of the Earth (Sibelius) =

Patriotic cantata by Jean Sibelius (1919)

- Cantata by Jean Sibelius
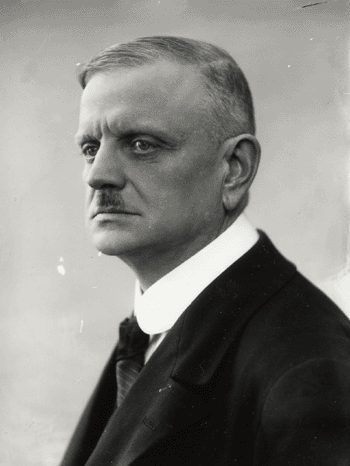
- The composer (c. 1918)
- Native name: Jordens sång
- Opus: 93
- Text: Jordens sång; by Jarl Hemmer
- Language: Swedish
- Composed: 1919
- Duration: 16 mins.

Premiere
- Date: 11 October 1919
- Location: Turku, Finland
- Conductor: Jean Sibelius
- Performers: Turku Musical Society; amateur choir

Song of the Earth (in Swedish: Jordens sång; subtitled "Cantata for the Inaugural Ceremonies of Åbo Akademi University 1919"), Op. 93, is a single-movement, patriotic cantata for mixed choir and orchestra written in 1919 by the Finnish composer Jean Sibelius. The piece, which is a setting of the Finnish author Jarl Hemmer's Swedish-language poem of the same name, is chronologically the seventh of Sibelius's nine orchestral cantatas; in particular, it belongs to the series of four "little known, but beautiful" cantatas from the composer's mature period that also includes My Own Land (Op. 92, 1918), Hymn of the Earth (Op. 95, 1920), and Väinämöinen's Song (Op. 110, 1926). Song of the Earth premiered on 11 October 1919 in Turku, Finland, with Sibelius conducting the Turku Musical Society and an amateur choir.

== Instrumentation ==
Song of the Earth is scored for the following instruments and voices, organized by family (vocalists, woodwinds, brass, percussion, and strings):

- Mixed choir (SATTBB)
- 2 flutes, 4 clarinets (or 2 oboes and 2 clarinets), and 2 bassoons
- 3 horns, 2 trumpets, and 2 trombones
- Timpani
- Violins (I and II), violas, cellos, and double basses

== History ==
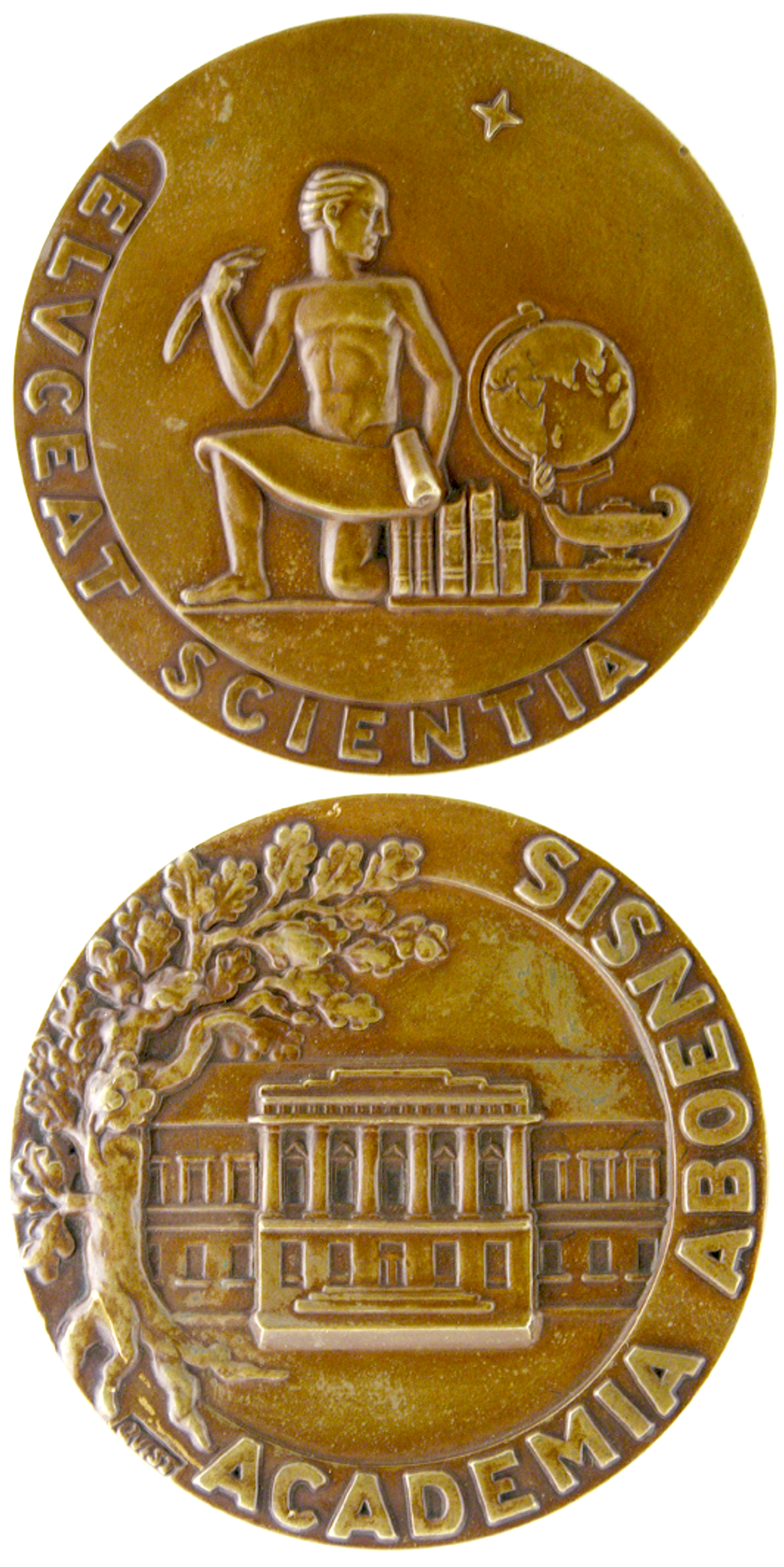
A medal commemorating the 1918 inauguration of Åbo Akademi University

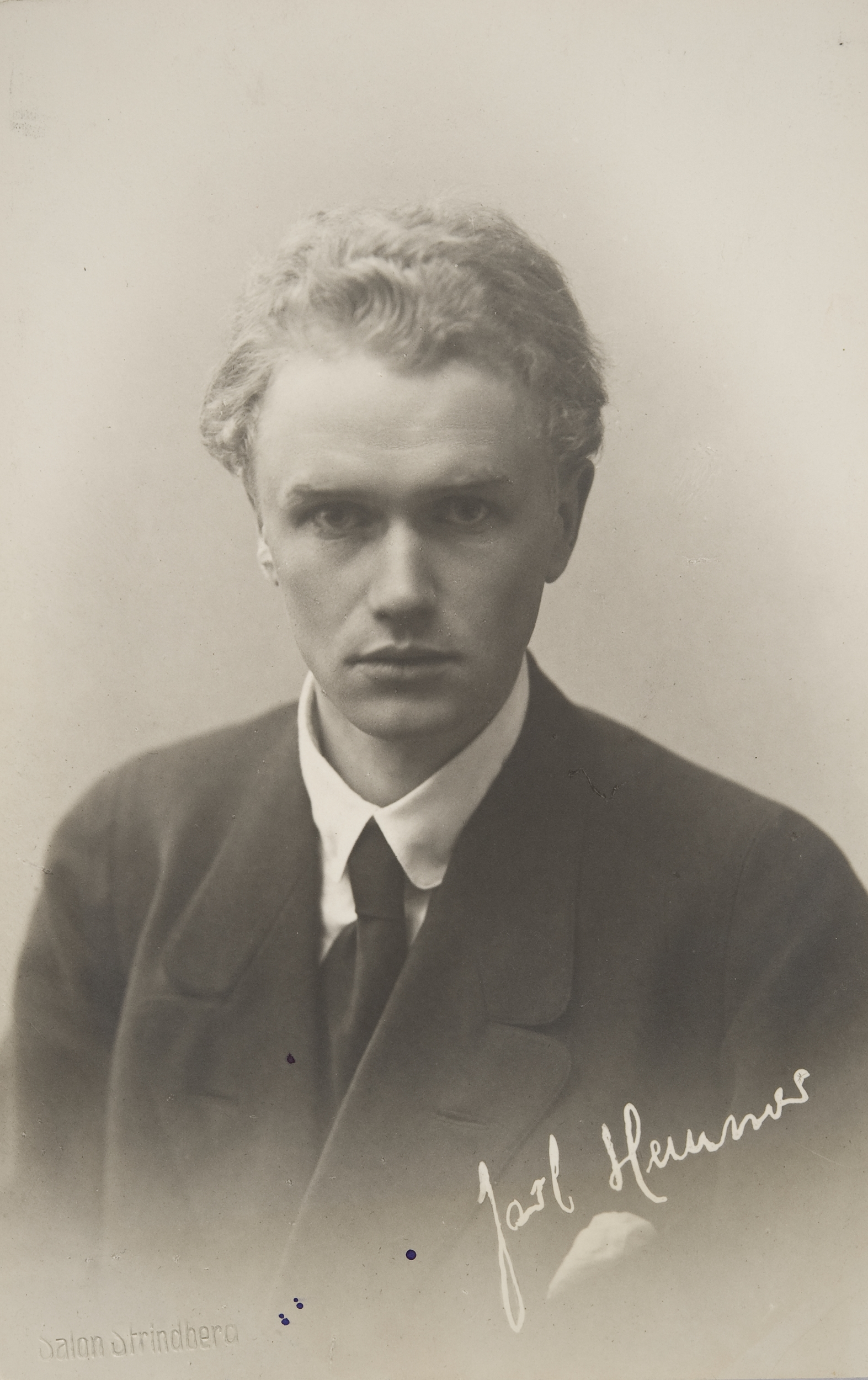
The Finnish author Jarl Hemmer (c. 1910s) wrote the text for Sibelius's cantata.

In 1918, Åbo Akademi University was founded; the university commissioned Sibelius to compose a piece for its inauguration, originally scheduled for the spring of 1919.

Original Swedish

Hur vita vila höga himlanejder!
Hur djupt är evighetens sus!
Men Jorden skakas av de bittra fejder,
som rasa i dess blodbestänkta grus. —
Och aldrig har ett släkte blött
och stridit och sargat så sin egen själ och lidit
som det, som nu står ropande på ljus. [...]

Själva måste vi bryta oss vägen
fram genom ondskans vallar av is,
själva måste vi här på vår egen
jord plantera vårt paradis.

English translation (Note: This translation is from the liner notes to the recording by Osmo Vänskä, the Lahti Symphony Orchestra, and the Dominante Choir.)

How white the lofty heavens stretch out!
How deep is the sigh of eternity!
But earth is shaken by the bitter feuds
That rage in its bloodstained, stony soil. —
And never has a race bled and fought
And harrowed its own soul and suffered
Like the one that now stands, calling for light. [...]

We ourselves must forge a path
Forward, through evil's icy ramparts,
We ourselves must plant our own paradise
Here on our own earth.

== Discography ==
The Ukrainian-American conductor Theodore Kuchar and the Turku Philharmonic Orchestra made the world premiere studio recording of Song of the Earth in April 1987 for MILS; they were joined by two academic choirs associated with Åbo Akademi University: Florakören (a female choir) and Brahe Djäknar (a male choir). The table below lists this and other commercially available recordings:

No.	Conductor	Orchestra	Chorus	Rec. (Note: Refers to the year in which the performers recorded the work; this may not be the same as the year in which the recording was first released to the general public.)	Time (Note: All runtimes are official, as printed on CD or LP liner notes.)	Venue	Label	Ref.
1	Theodore Kuchar	Turku Philharmonic Orchestra	Florakören and Brahe Djäknar	1987	15:52	Turku Concert Hall	MILS	(Note: T. Kuchar—MILS (MILS 9027) 1990)
2	Osmo Vänskä	Lahti Symphony Orchestra	Dominante Choir	2004	14:20	Sibelius Hall	BIS	(Note: O. Vänskä—BIS (CD–1365) 2005)

== Notes, references, and sources ==
Notes

Sources

- Barnett, Andrew (2005). Sibelius: Song of the Earth (booklet). Osmo Vänskä, Lahti Symphony Orchestra, & Dominante Choir. BIS. BIS CD-1365. OCLC 62255940
- Barnett, Andrew (2007). Sibelius. New Haven: Yale University Press. ISBN 978-0-300-11159-0.
- Dahlström, Fabian [in Swedish] (2003). Jean Sibelius: Thematisch-bibliographisches Verzeichnis seiner Werke [Jean Sibelius: A Thematic Bibliographic Index of His Works] (in German). Wiesbaden: Breitkopf & Härtel. ISBN 3-7651-0333-0.
- Lascar, Pierre-Yves (2003). Sibelius: Cantatas (booklet). Paavo Järvi, Estonian National Symphony Orchestra, & Estonian National Male Choir. Virgin Classics. 7243 5 45589 2 4. OCLC 52897195
