= Sibelius Museum =

Museum in Turku, Finland

Coordinates: 60.4537°N 22.2775°E

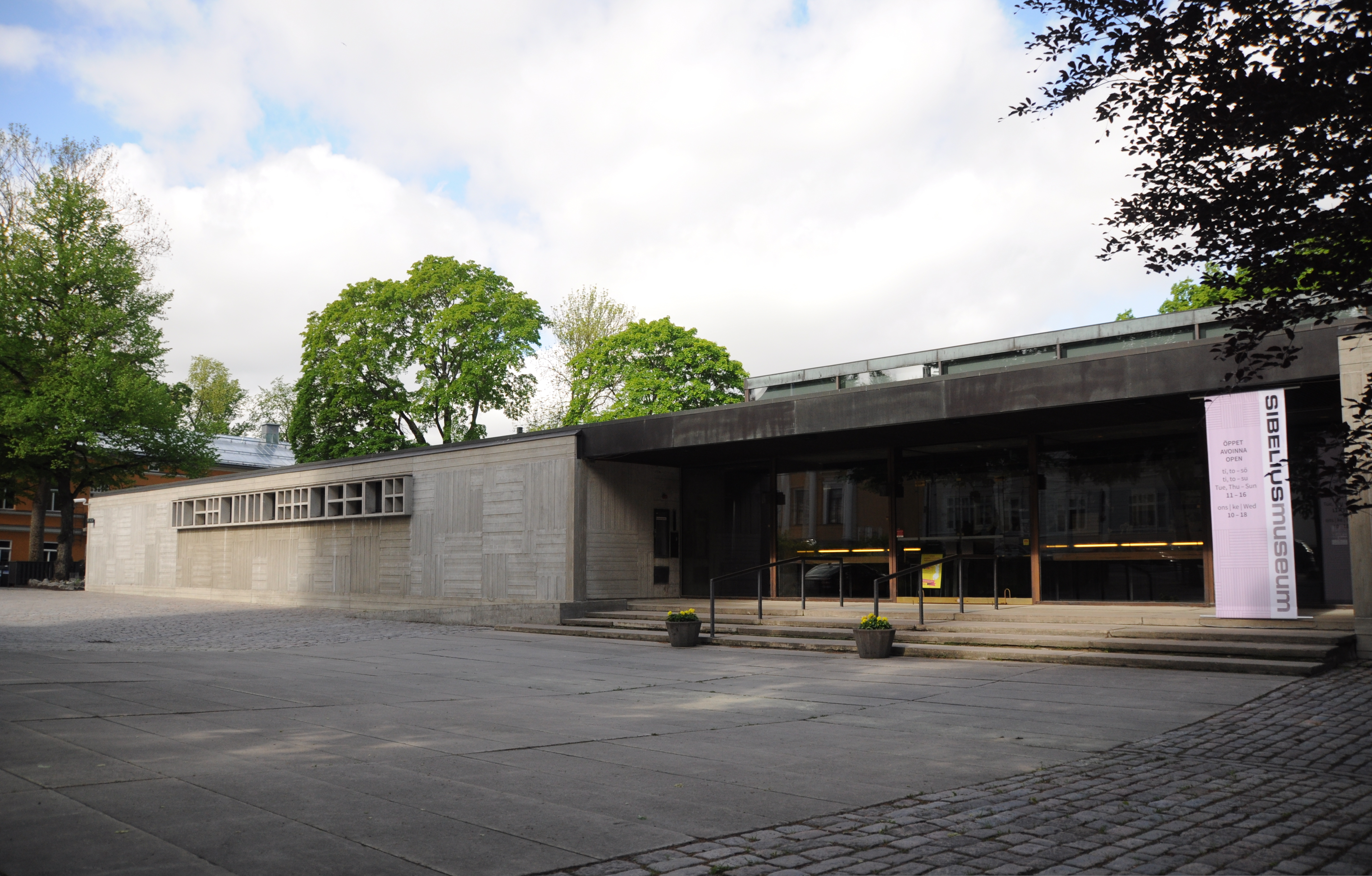
The main facade and entrance of the Museum

The Sibelius Museum (Finnish: Sibelius-museo, Swedish: Sibeliusmuseum) is a museum of music, named after the Finnish composer Jean Sibelius. The museum is located close to Turku Cathedral in the historical city centre of Turku on the southwest coast of Finland. It is the only museum devoted to music in Finland. The museum houses a wide collection of historical music instruments from around the world. The archives of the museum include documents (sheet music, manuscripts, recordings, photographs, concert programmes, etc.) The museum was first founded during the 1920s as a seminar for the Department of Musicology at Åbo Akademi University and has later developed into its own department. The Museum is currently organised and funded by the Åbo Akademi Foundation. The current building was built and opened in 1968, and it was designed by architect Woldemar Baeckman.

== General information ==
The museum consists of two primary exhibitions: the instrument collection and the Sibelius exhibition. The instrument collections circles around the concert hall of the museum, The Sibelius Hall, and continues to the second-floor downstairs. The Sibelius exhibition is located at the furthest left corner seen from the ticket counter. The museum also organises thematic exhibitions. In 2018, these exhibitions are "Sibbe50" and "A cantata for the doctors – Music at academic ceremonies". "´Sibbe50" celebrates the architecture of Woldemar Baeckman and the 50th anniversary of the current museum building. The exhibition "A cantata for the doctors – Music at academic" ceremonies covers music performed at conferment ceremonies in Finnish universities.

The Sibelius Museum also organises concerts at the museum, of which the most notable is the museum's own concert series, the Wednesday series that has been organised since 1968. In addition to these concerts, there are also other concerts organised at the museum. The programme of the concert varies depending on the performer, but mostly the music played at The Sibelius Museum is focused on jazz, folk music and classical chamber music.

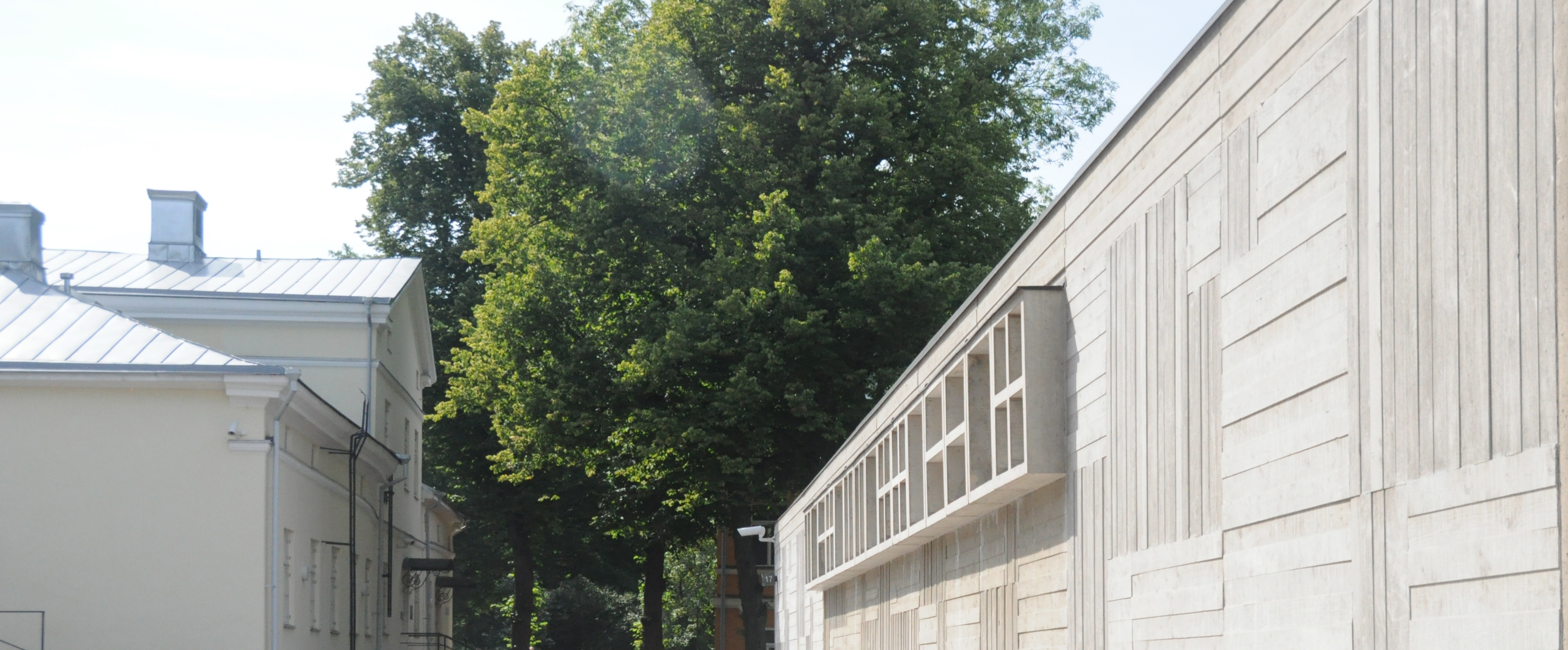
Details of the facade

The archives of The Sibelius Museum date back to the collections of professor Otto Andersson of the Musicological Department at Åbo Akademi University. The archives contain material from several different aspects of musical life in Finland, such as manuscripts, photographs and recordings. There are additionally several special collections in the archives. These collections include an extensive collection about Jean Sibelius, the Otto Andersson archival collection and the archive of the Musical Society of Turku.

In addition to the exhibitions and the archives, there are also a couple of auditoriums and classrooms in the premises of the museum. For instance, the auditoriums Brahe and Flora that have been named after the student choirs of Åbo Akademi University, Brahe Djäknar and Florakören.

== History ==
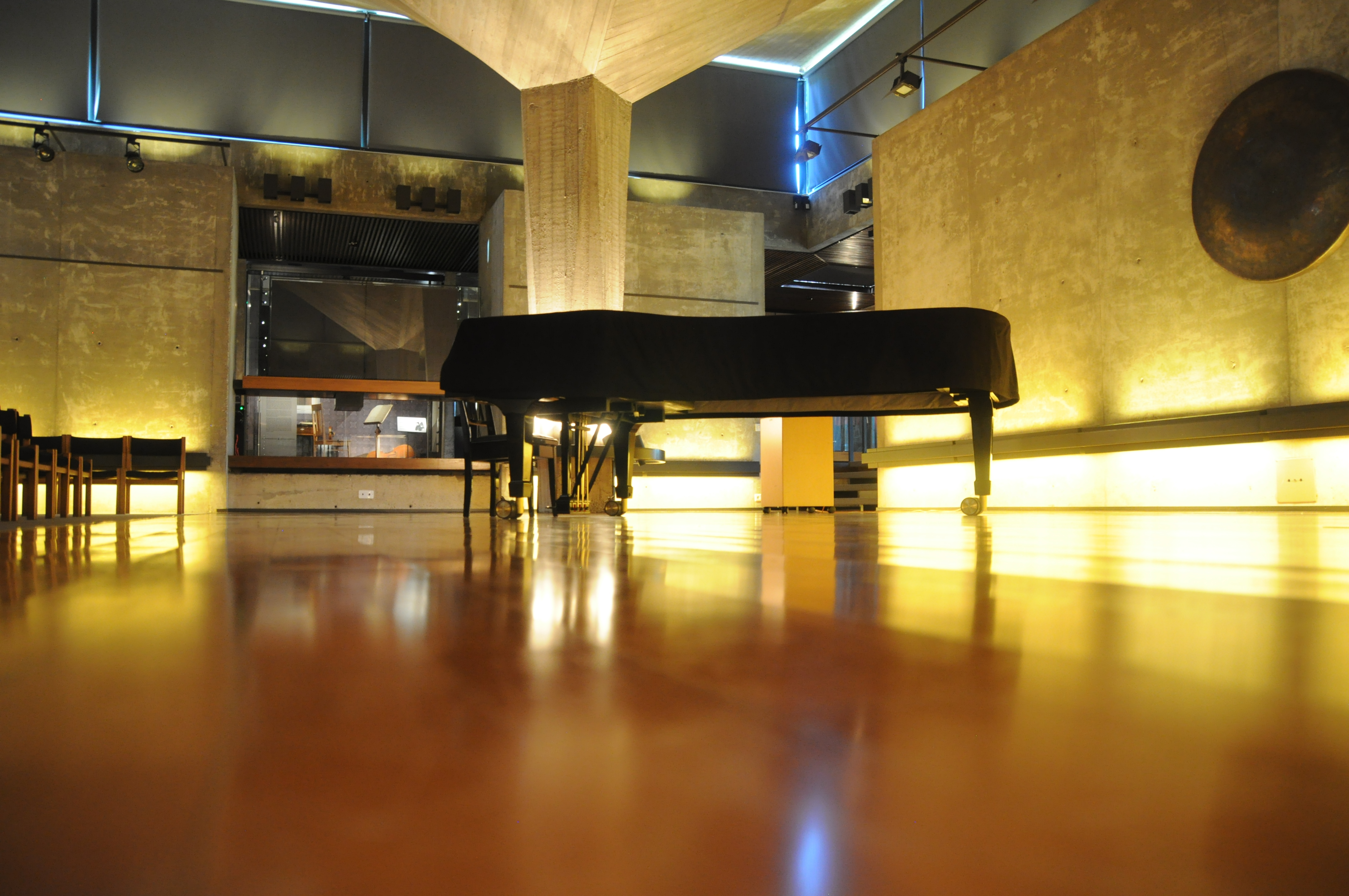
A grand piano in the Sibelius Hall

=== Time before the museum: Pehr Kalm and the botanical garden ===
At the site of The Sibelius Museum, the botanical garden of the Royal Academy of Turku (Swedish: Kungliga Akademien I Åbo, Finnish: Kuninkaallinen Turun Akatemia) was located. Pehr Kalm, a pupil of Carl von Linné, founded the garden in 1757. In the garden, he planted plants from his trips to North America and Russia. After the Great Fire of Turku in 1827, the only plant that survived was an Oak tree that stands between the bank of the river Aura and the current museum building. After the fire, printer Christian Ludvig Hjelt bought the site of the garden in 1831 and built a couple of wooden houses on the plot.

=== Åbo Akademi University ===
In 1923, Ellen and Magnus Dahlström donated the site of the garden to the Åbo Akademi Foundation in a will. Attempts to restore the garden to its original state were made during the 1930s, during which Justus Montell aimed at planting his collections next to the oak from Kalm's era. After he died in 1954 the attempts were ended, which lead to the decaying of the garden and demolitions of the houses built by Hjelt.

=== Otto Andersson as the founder of the Musicological Department and Archives ===
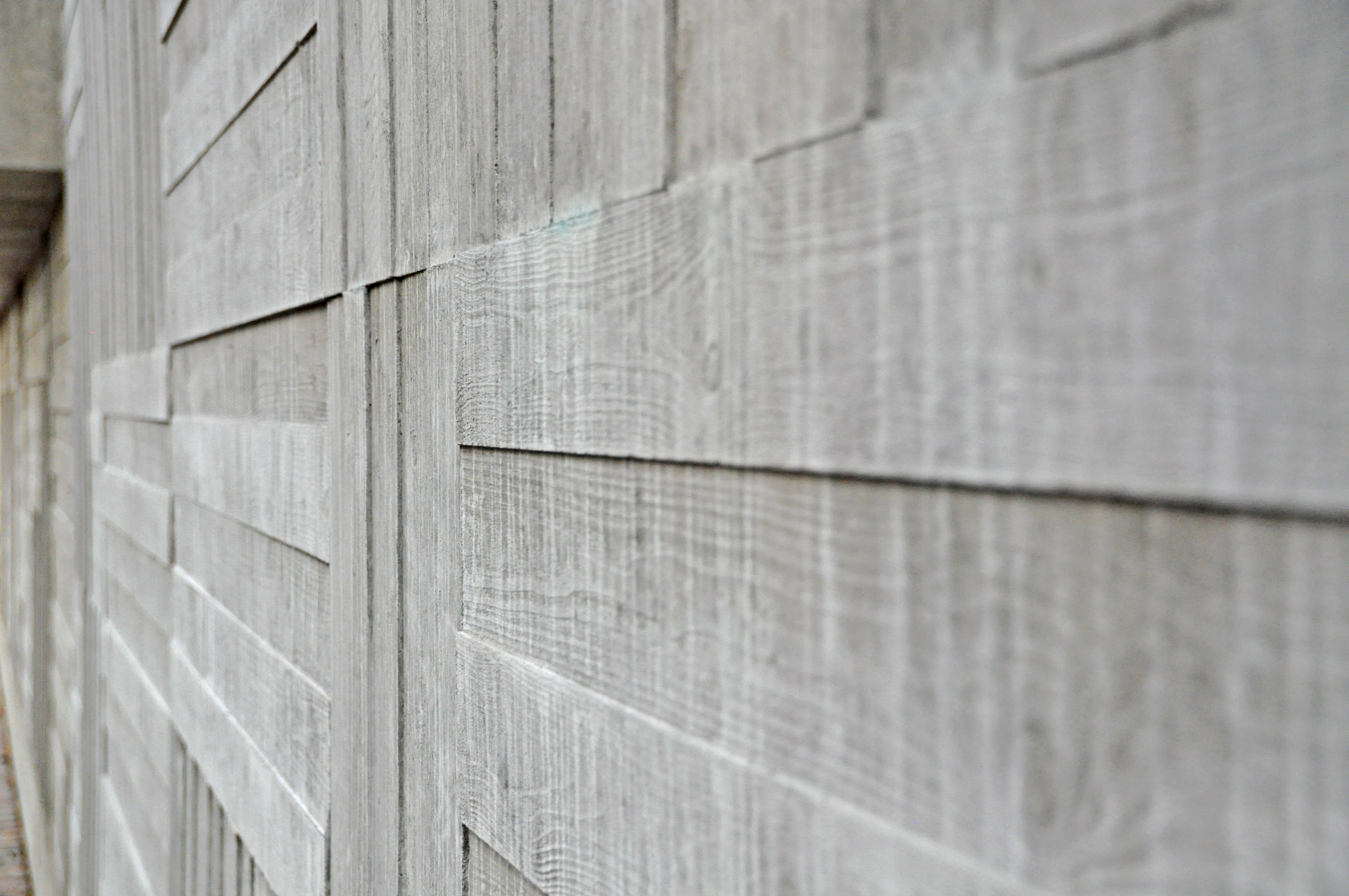
Further details on the wall

The foundations of the proper historical music museum were already made in 1926, when Otto Andersson was granted the professorship of the recently established Department of Musicology and Folklore at Åbo Akademi University. The ship-owner Robert Mattson donated the necessary funds to fund the professorship and to purchase materials for the collection and the seminar. Also, Mattson's son, Curt, had donated a notable collection of instruments from all around the world for the collections of professor Andersson. The original idea behind the collections was, however, to form a seminar for the Department of Musicology that would have as large of a library as possible.

=== The Museum receives its current name ===
Before the year 1949, The Sibelius Museum did not yet have a proper name, and it was simply known as "The historical music collections of Åbo Akademi University". In the late 1940s, an exhibition about the composer Jean Sibelius was organised. There were several items placed in the exhibition varying from sheet music to letters and manuscripts. Some journalist miscalled the exhibition "The Sibelius Museum", which aroused controversy between Professor Andersson and the rector of Åbo Akademi University G.O. Rosenqvist. To avoid any further confusion about the exhibition, Professor Andersson sent a letter to the composer, in which he asked a formal permission to use the name of Sibelius in official contexts. The composed replied on 16 January 1949 with the following words:

It is with great pleasure I agree on that the historical music collections of the school of Åbo Akademi shall bear the name "Sibelius Museum". To you, I am deeply grateful for the friendly interest you have always shown towards my life and my art. It has followed something unique from this; from that, Åbo Akademi University has the greatest collection in existence. It gives me pride and joy to accept this.

— Jean Sibelius

After the name change, the museum received its first permanent premises in the house that currently works as the restaurant Hus Lindman. In the manor at Piispankatu 15, "The Sibelius Museum" had seven rooms in use, to which the collections and the administrative areas were placed. At the same time, new acquisitions were increased. For example, Andersson travelled with these purposes in America during the 1950s. The years in this building turned out to be long and hard and hopes for an exclusive building for the museum had arisen.

=== The planning of the current building ===
Towards the end of the 1950s, several discussions were made between the city of Turku and Åbo Akademi University to build a joint museum about Jean Sibelius and Wäinö Aaltonen. The idea was put forward with the thought of using the site of the garden from Kalm's era as the base for the museum. This joint venture, however, dissolved and only the plans to build The Sibelius Museum advanced. Regardless of this, the city of Turku still funded the project. Architect Woldemar Baeckman was during the 1960s assigned to design the building for the museum for Åbo Akademi University. In his original plans, he had planned a separate wing for the choir activities of the university. Before the final plans, a couple of investigations were made in 1963 and 1966. The conclusion of these investigations was to give up this thought of building a separate wing and the focus was put on the main building. During the autumn of 1966, the final plans were finished and during the next year, the construction work started. The construction of the building was completed in February 1968, during which the building was put in use.

== Architectural design ==
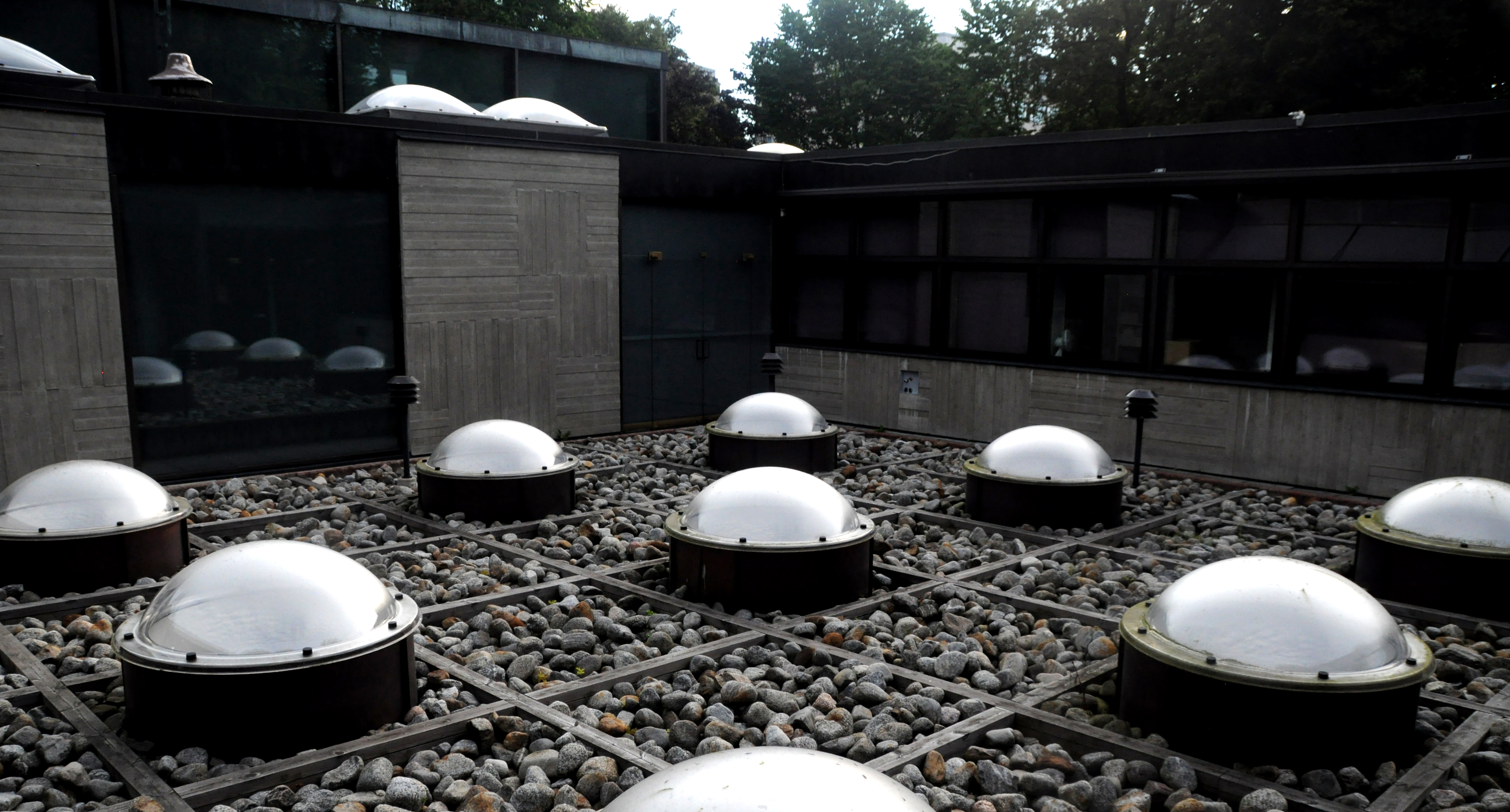
The Atrium of The Sibelius Museum

The building is a notable example of the Brutalist concrete architecture of its time, though Baeckman's earlier architecture was more classically modernist in style, most notably the extension to the Åbo Akademi University Library. The exterior architecture is notable for the grains of the timber formwork being visible in the prefabricated concrete facades. The interior is particularly notable for the large hyperbolic paraboloid-shaped concrete shell structure, said to have been influenced by the then contemporaneous architecture of the Mexican architect Félix Candela. In the centre of the building is a hidden courtyard which originally had a garden (since demolished) designed by noted Finnish garden designer Maj-Lis Rosenbröijer.

== See also ==
- List of music museums
