= Song of the Earth (disambiguation) =

Song of the Earth is a 1969 novel by Welsh writer Alexander Cordell.

Song of the Earth or The Song of the Earth may also refer to:

== Music ==
- Das Lied von der Erde ("The song of the Earth"), a composition by Austro-Bohemian composer Gustav Mahler
  - Song of the Earth (ballet), based on the composition
- Song of the Earth (Sibelius), a 1919 composition
- Song of the Earth (album), 2025, by Dirty Projectors

== Television ==
- The Song of the Earth, a 2000 BBC documentary

== See also ==
- Earth (disambiguation) § Songs
