= Florakören =

Finland-Swedish women's choir in Turku, Finland

Florakören vid Åbo Akademi
- Choir
- Origin: Turku, Finland
- Founded: 1944; 82 years ago
- Genre: Choral (female voice)
- Chief conductor: Hanna Kronqvist
- Headquarters: Turku, Finland
- Affiliation: Åbo Akademi University
- Associated groups: Brahe Djäknar; Akademiska Orkestern
- Website: florakoren.fi

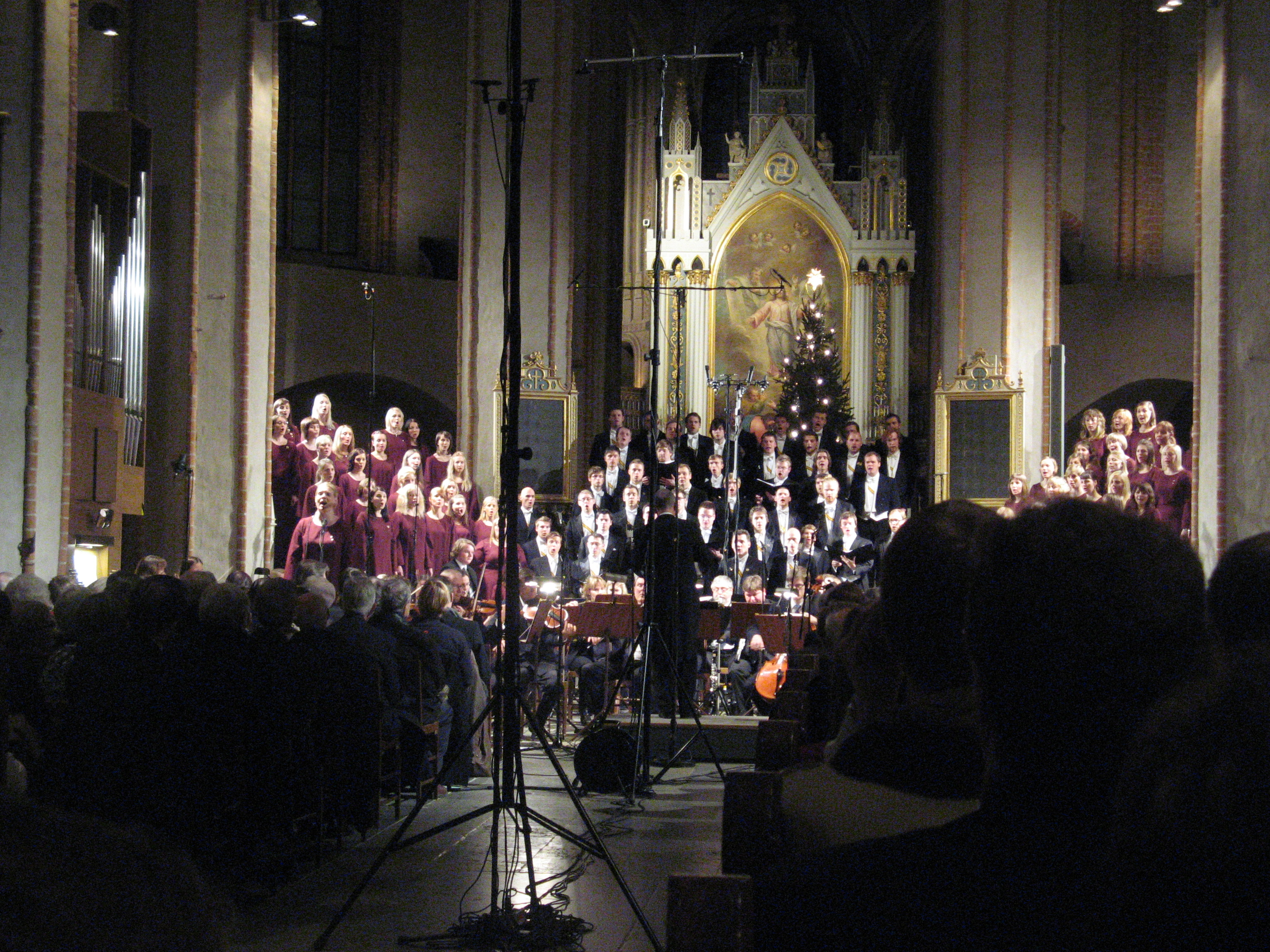
Advent concert in Turku Cathedral together with Åbo Akademi University male voice choir Brahe Djäknar and symphony orchestra Akademiska Orkestern

Florakören vid Åbo Akademi (Finland Swedish pronunciation: [ˈfluːrɑˌkœːren vid ˈoːbu ɑkɑdeˈmiː]), (Note: Literally "The Flora Choir at Åbo Akademi University".) also referred to as simply Florakören or Flora, is a Finland-Swedish academic women's choir in Turku, Finland.

== Overview ==
The choir was formed in 1944. The earliest incarnation of the choir was briefly known as Damkören Lyran.

Conductors
From	To	Name	Notes
Temporary conductors 1945–1948 (Note: The temporary conductors were Professor Otto Andersson (appointed honorary conductor in 1945 and honorary member in 1960), Professor John Rosas (appointed honorary member in 1965), Nils Holmqvist, Åke Weijola, and Bertel Engblom.)
Interregnum 1948–1956
1956	1990	Gottfrid Gräsbeck	Appointed honorary conductor in 1991
1991	2000	Ulf Långbacka	
2000	2001	Heikki Seppänen	
2001		Ulf Långbacka	Incumbent
2007	2007	Hanna Kronqvist	Interim conductor
2009	2009	Heidi Gräsbeck	Interim conductor
2009	2011	Anna Johnson née Rikberg	Interim conductor
2023		Hanna Kronqvist	
