= Dalia Stasevska =

Finnish conductor

- Born: 30 December 1984 (age 41); Kyiv, Ukrainian SSR, Soviet Union
- Education: Tampere Conservatory; Sibelius Academy; Royal Swedish Academy of Music
- Occupation: Conductor
- Spouse: Lauri Porra

Dalia Stasevska (Ukrainian: Даля Андріївна Стасевська; born 30 December 1984) is a Ukrainian-born Finnish conductor. She is currently principal guest conductor of the BBC Symphony Orchestra.

== Biography ==
Born in Kyiv, Ukrainian SSR, Soviet Union, Stasevska and her family subsequently moved to Tallinn, and later to Finland when she was five. Her family lived in Helsinki for a year, and then moved to Tampere. As a youth, Stasevska learned the violin, and later formally studied violin and composition at the Tampere Conservatory. She continued her musical studies in violin and viola at the Sibelius Academy in Helsinki. In her twenties, she developed a new interest in conducting, and pawned her violin to finance education in conducting. Stasevska studied conducting at the Royal Swedish Academy of Music, where her teachers included Jorma Panula, and at the Sibelius Academy, where her teachers included Leif Segerstam. She earned a diploma from the Sibelius Academy in 2012.

From 2010 to 2015, Stasevska was artistic director of the Kamarikesä Festival. From 2014 to 2016 she was an assistant conductor to Paavo Järvi at the Orchestre de Paris and in 2015 first guest-conducted the Lahti Symphony Orchestra (Sinfonia Lahti). On 10 December 2018, she conducted the Royal Stockholm Philharmonic Orchestra at the Nobel Prize Award Ceremony 2018, the second female conductor ever to conduct the orchestra at the Prize Award Ceremony.

Stasevska made her UK guest-conducting debut in 2018 with the orchestra of Opera North. In May 2018 she first guest-conducted the BBC Symphony Orchestra at a Maida Vale studio concert. On the basis of this appearance, in January 2019, the BBC SO announced the appointment of Stasevska as its next principal guest conductor, effective July 2019. Stasevska is the first female conductor ever to be named principal guest conductor of the BBC SO, and the second female conductor to have a titled post with a BBC orchestra. She made her public debut with the BBC SO at The Proms in July 2019. She conducted the Last Night of The Proms in September 2020, under social distancing conditions and without an audience in the wake of the COVID-19 pandemic, the second female conductor to conduct the Last Night and the third Last Night to feature a female conductor. In November 2020, the Royal Philharmonic Society announced Stasevska as the recipient of its 2020 Conductor Award. In July 2021, she conducted the First Night of The Proms, the second female conductor ever to conduct the First Night. She was scheduled to conduct the 2022 Last Night, but the death of Elizabeth II caused the cancellation of the concert. Stasevska again conducted the First Night in 2023. In January 2025, the BBC SO announced an additional extension of Stasevska's contract as its principal guest conductor through September 2027.

In May 2020, the Lahti Symphony Orchestra announced the appointment of Stasevska as its next chief conductor, effective from the 2021–2022 season, with an initial contract of three seasons. This appointment marks her first chief conductor post. Stasevska is the first female conductor to be named chief conductor of the Lahti Symphony Orchestra. In March 2023, the orchestra announced an extension of Stasevska's contract through 31 July 2025. She stood down from the Lahti Symphony Orchestra at the close of the 2024-2025 season.

Stasevska is married to the Finnish musician and composer Lauri Porra, the bassist for Stratovarius and the great-grandson of Jean Sibelius. The couple had their first child, a daughter, Aurora, in 2023.

Cultural offices
Preceded by Dima Slobodeniouk	Chief Conductor, Lahti Symphony Orchestra; 2021–2025	Succeeded by (post vacant)
