= Martin Segerstråle =

Finnish music director, pianist, conductor, and composer

- Born: August 31, 1984 (age 41); Turku, Finland
- Occupations: Music director, pianist, conductor, composer
- Years active: 2008-present

Martin Segerstråle BA MMus PGDip DipRAM LRAM, born August 31, 1984, in Turku, Finland, is a Finnish music director, pianist, conductor and composer.

Segerstråle studied Musical Direction and Coaching at the Royal Academy of Music in London and choral conducting and piano at the Sibelius Academy. He also studied musicology at Åbo Akademi University.

Segerstråle has conducted several choirs in Finland and was artistic leader of the Studentkören Brahe Djäknar student choir in 2010. Segerstråle was one of the founding members and first artistic leader of the chamber ensemble Ensemble Vida. He was also the bass principal of the internationally acclaimed chamber choir Key Ensemble for many years.

Segerstråle received the Finlands Svenska Sång- och Musikförbund conducting prize, Kurt-Erik Långbacka-priset, in October 2014. In the spring of 2015, he was awarded the Svenska Kulturfonden annual culture prize for outstanding contributions to the music life of Finland.

Segerstråle was the MD for Andrew Lloyd Webber's musical Cats in Tampere, Finland in 2017-2018 and also MD’d a production of Disney's The Hunchback of Notre Dame at the same venue in 2019-2020. He has also worked at the Finnish National Opera and the Swedish-speaking theatres in Helsinki, Svenska Teatern, and Turku, Åbo Svenska Teater.
