= YL Male Voice Choir =

YL Male Voice Choir (formerly: Helsinki University Chorus; Finnish: Ylioppilaskunnan Laulajat) was founded by P. J. Hannikainen in 1883 to become the choir of the Helsinki University. It is also the oldest Finnish-language choir. Nowadays the choir is not completely tied to the university, but all applicants are expected to have passed the matriculation exam or study at any university level. Up to June 2010, YL was conducted by Matti Hyökki. In July 2010, Pasi Hyökki began his tenure as conductor of the choir.

== Concerts ==
YL gives concerts regularly in Finland and abroad. The choir makes two short concert tours in Finland each year, and one or two tours yearly in the Asian, European or American continent. Recent years have seen YL tour in Norway (2009), Belgium and USA (2010) and China and Mexico (2011). The concert tour in USA had a grand finale in Carnegie Hall with Osmo Vänskä and the Minnesota Orchestra. Around 12 000 listeners attend YL's Christmas concerts in the churches of Helsinki each year, and thousands to hear the traditional songs celebrating First of May.
