= Ulf Långbacka =

Finland-Swedish conductor and composer

Ulf Långbacka (born 1957) is a Finland-Swedish conductor and composer.

Långbacka trained at the Sibelius Academy in Helsinki. He received his diploma in choral conducting in 1987. He has been the director of the chamber choir Cantabile, and since 1991 has been a lecturer in musicology at Åbo Akademi University and conductor of the Brahe Djäknar and Florakören choirs. Between 1993 and 1996, Långbacka was conductor with the Finnish Swedish Choir Federation. He has composed choral works and chamber music, including the cantata The Inner Light, written for Åbo Akademi's 80th anniversary in 1998. He has won prizes in several competitions for his choral compositions, among them second prize in the Turku Conservatory Nordic composition contest in 2007.

Långbacka has also worked as a teacher of choral conducting at the Sibelius Academy.

In 2011, his opera Henrik och Häxhammaren (Henrik and the Hammer of Witches) had its premiere at Turku Castle as part of Turku's year as joint European Capital of Culture.
