= Otto Andersson (musicologist) =

Finnish musicologist

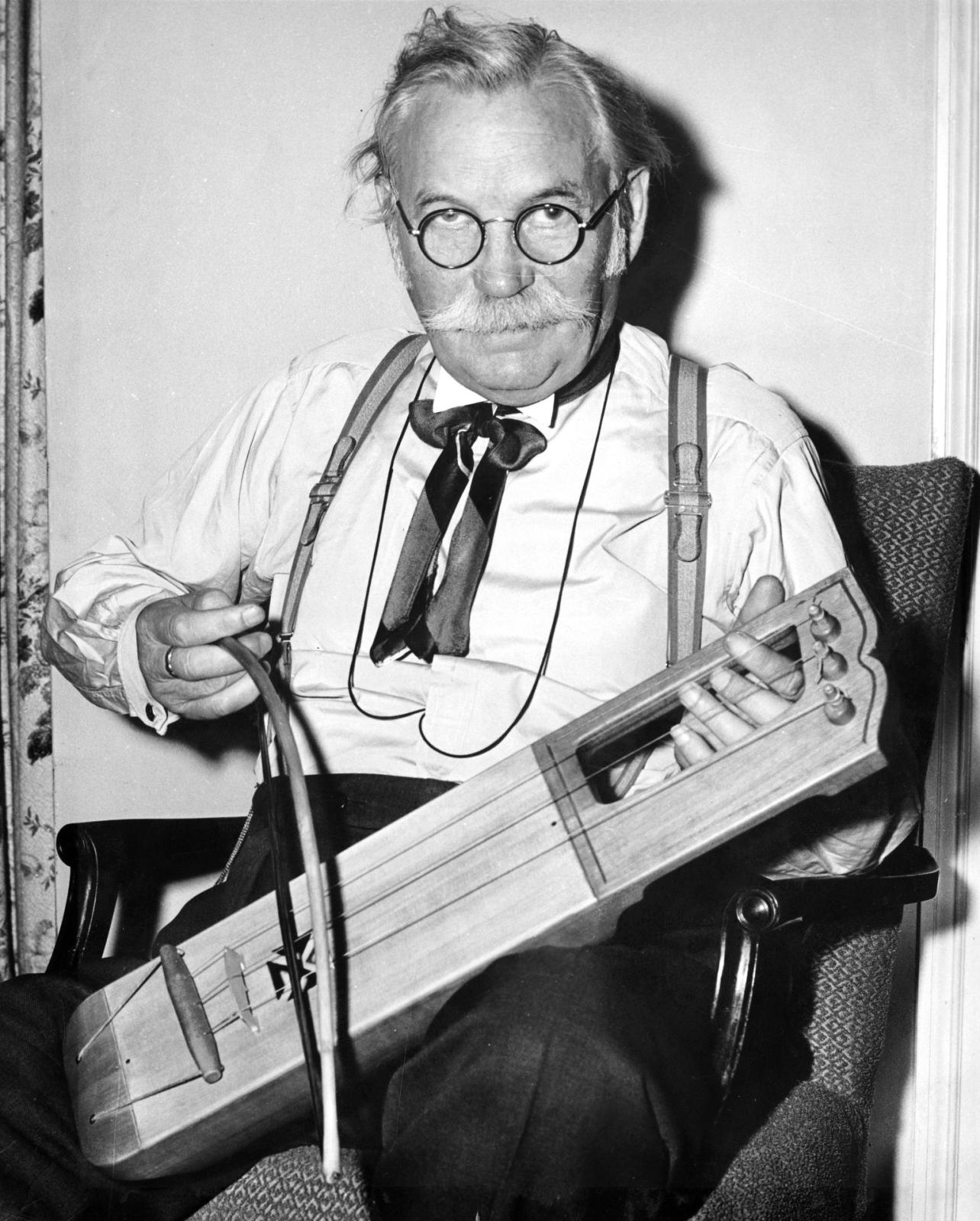
Otto Andersson in 1954 with a bowed harp.

Otto Emanuel Andersson (27 April 1879 – 27 December 1969) was a Finnish musicologist.

Andersson studied first at the Helsingfors musikinstitut (now the Sibelius Academy), becoming a teacher there. He studied folklore and music from 1908 onwards, and gained his Ph.D. in 1923 at the University of Helsinki. From 1926 on, he held the Robert Mattsons chair in musicology and folklore at the Åbo Akademi. In 1906, he formed the Brage Society, dedicated to Finland's Swedish folk music and culture, serving later as the group's chairman and choirmaster.

Andersson founded three music magazines, wrote a variety of valuable essays and collected and arranged traditional Swedish, Finnish and Estonian folk songs and dances. He also served as a contributor to the Svensk uppslagsbok dictionary, producing music-related entries.

== Selected works ==
- Violinists and Dance-tunes Among the Swedish Population of Finland Towards the Middle of the Nineteenth Century. Novello, 1912
- Svensk uppslagsbok (Swedish Dictionary). Lund 1929
- The bowed-harp: a study in the history of early musical instruments. W. Reeves, 1930
- On Gaelic Folk Music from the Isle of Lewis. 1953
- Ballad Hunting in the Orkney Islands. Budklaven, 1954
- The Shetland Gue, the Welsh Crwth, and the Northern Bowed Harp. 1956
