= Brahe Djäknar =

Finnish choir

Studentkören Brahe Djäknar
- Choir
- Emblem
- Origin: Turku, Finland
- Founded: 1937; 89 years ago
- Genre: Choral (male voice)
- Chief conductor: Hanna Kronqvist
- Headquarters: Turku, Finland
- Affiliation: Åbo Akademi University
- Associated groups: Florakören; Akademiska Orkestern
- Website: brahedjaknar.fi

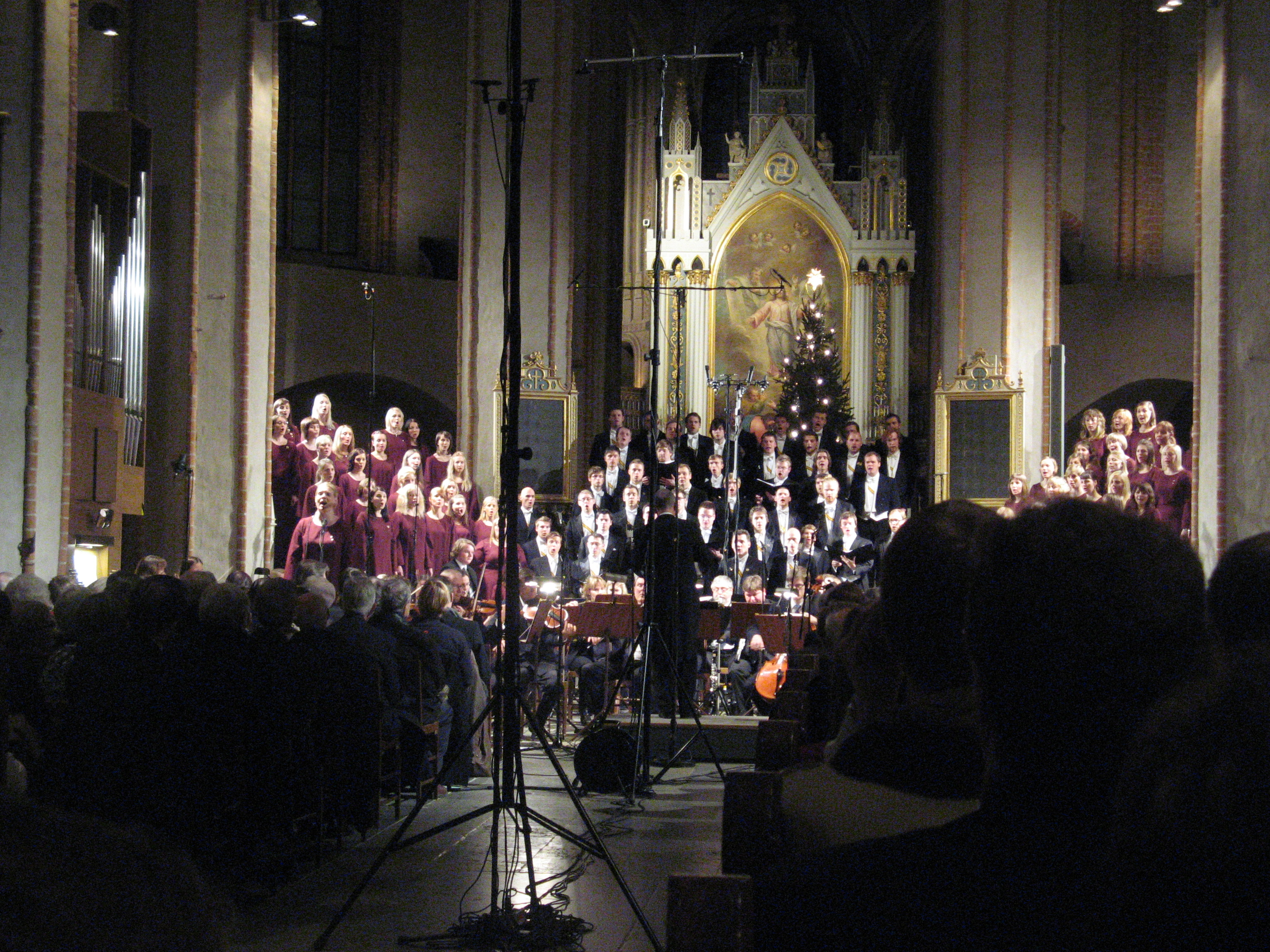
Advent concert in Turku Cathedral together with Åbo Akademi University female voice choir Florakören and symphony orchestra Akademiska Orkestern

Studentkören Brahe Djäknar (Finland Swedish pronunciation: [stʉˈdentˌkœːren ˈbrɑːhe ˈ(d)jeːknɑr]), also referred to as simply Brahe Djäknar, abbreviated BD, is a Finland-Swedish academic male voice choir in Turku, Finland.

== Overview ==
The choir was founded in 1937 and was directed by John Rosas until 1955. Rosas was succeeded by Gottfrid Gräsbeck, who was in turn succeeded by Ulf Långbacka in 1991.

The choir is known for its annual Christmas concerts around the first Sunday of Advent in the Turku Cathedral together with its Åbo Akademi University sister choir Florakören, and the Åbo Akademi University symphony orchestra Akademiska Orkestern. The choir also performs on 30 April every year to celebrate the coming of spring; these concerts have for many years been broadcast live on radio and TV.

The choir has toured abroad frequently, both on its own and together with Florakören, e.g. in Canada and the United States in 2005, in Norway in 2006, in Italy in 2007, in Poland in 2008, in France and Spain in 2009, in Austria in 2010, and in Japan in 2012, celebrating its 75th anniversary.

Conductors
From	To	Name	Notes
1937	1955	John Rosas	
1955	1990	Gottfrid Gräsbeck	
1991	2022	Ulf Långbacka	
2000	2001	Heikki Seppänen	Interim conductor
2010	2010	Martin Segerstråle	Interim conductor
2023		Hanna Kronqvist	Incumbent
