= Eri Klas =

Estonian conductor (1939–2016)

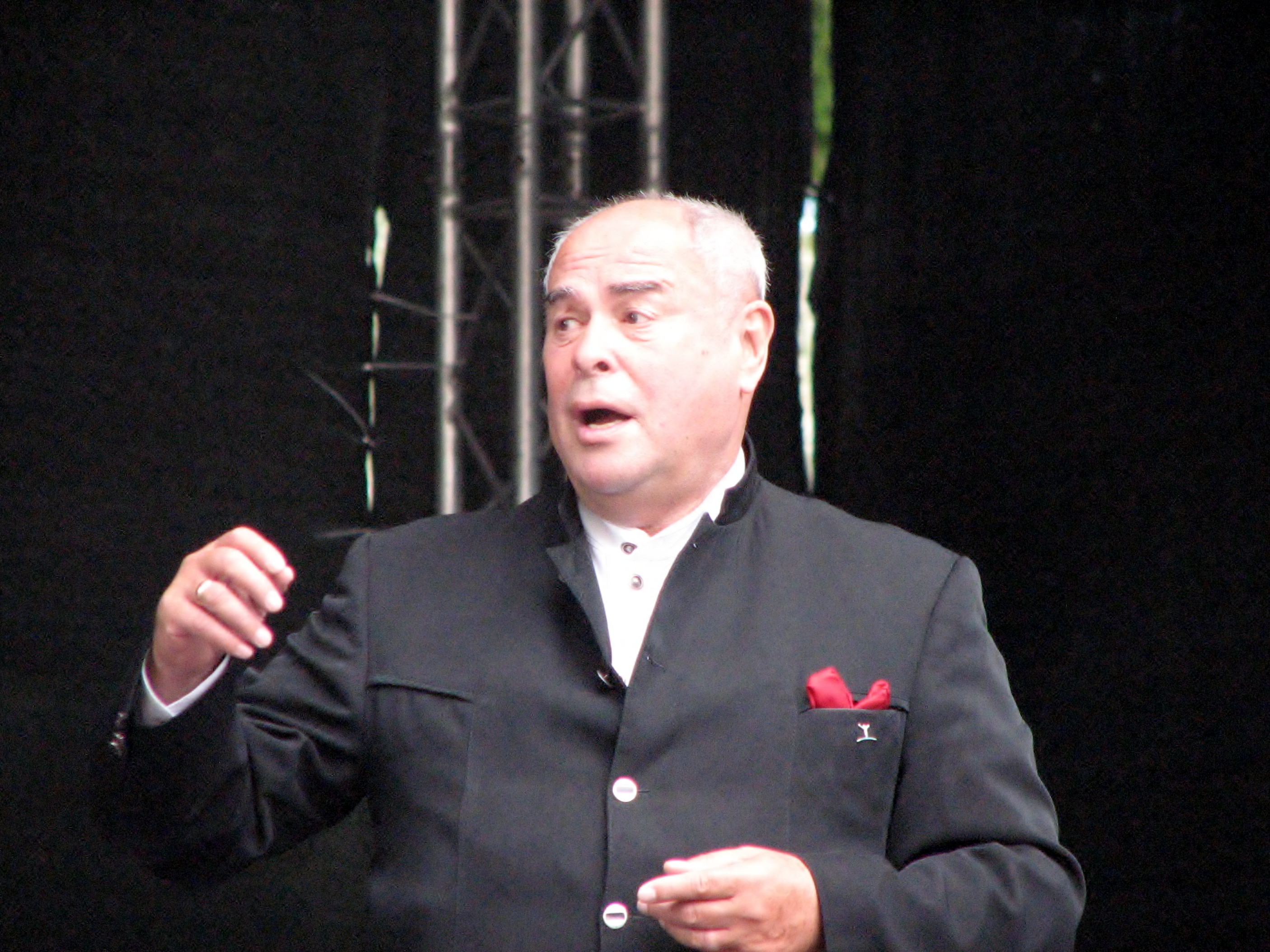
- Klas in 2012

Background information
- Born: June 7, 1939; Tallinn, Estonia
- Died: February 26, 2016 (aged 76) Tallinn, Estonia
- Genres: Classical
- Occupation: Conductor

Eri Klas (7 June 1939 – 26 February 2016) was an Estonian conductor. He conducted or served as artistic director for the Estonian National Opera, the Finnish National Opera, the Danish Symphony Orchestra, the Netherlands Radio Symphony Orchestra, the Tampere Philharmonic Orchestra, the Tallinn Philharmonic, and the Novaya Opera.

== Life ==
Klas was born in Tallinn on 7 June 1939 into a Jewish family. His mother was the concert pianist Anna Klas. His father, Eduard Klas, was killed in 1941, during the Holocaust.

Klas joined the Estonian State Symphony Orchestra in 1959, where he played percussion. He trained to be a choir conductor at the Tallinn Conservatory at the same time, graduating in 1964 to train in orchestra conducting at the Leningrad Conservatory. He left the Estonian State Symphony Orchestra in 1965 when he became conductor of the Estonian National Opera. He was made the opera's artistic director and principal conductor in 1975.

Klas became principal conductor of the Royal Swedish Opera in 1985, principal visiting conductor of the Finnish National Opera in 1990, and chief conductor of the Danish Symphony Orchestra in 1991. He also became chairman of the Estonian Cultural Committee in 1991. He became conductor laureate of the Estonian National Opera in 1994, and he left the Danish Symphony Orchestra in 1996 to become chief conductor of the Netherlands Radio Symphony Orchestra.

Klas became artistic director of the Tampere Philharmonic Orchestra in 1998. He founded the Eri Klas Special Foundation for young musicians the same year. He became artistic director of the Tallinn Philharmonic in 2000. He ended his tenure as chief conductor of the Netherlands Radio Symphony Orchestra in 2003, instead becoming its principal guest conductor.

Klas was made conductor laureate of the Tampere Philharmonic Orchestra in 2006. He became chief conductor of the Novaya Opera the same year.

== Music ==
Klas was among the most globally well-known Estonian conductors. He broke precedent by touring through Europe with the Estonia National Opera. He was the first conductor for many Estonian composers, including Arvo Pärt, Lepo Sumera, Eino Tamberg, Veljo Tormis, and Eduard Tubin. He taught at the Estonian Music Academy.

== Personal life ==
Klas was a lightweight boxer, winning as a junior champion, and he later served on the Estonian Olympic Committee. He was a UNICEF Goodwill Ambassador. From 1972 until 1991, he was married to ballet dancer, singer and actress Ülle Ulla.

Cultural offices
Preceded by Norman Del Mar	Chief Conductor, Aarhus Symphony Orchestra; 1991–1996	Succeeded by James Loughran
Preceded by Uri Mayer	music advisor, Israel Sinfonietta Beersheba; 1999–2001	Succeeded by Menachem Nebenhaus
Preceded by Kees Bakels	Chief Conductor, Netherlands Radio Symphony; 1996–2003	Succeeded by Hans Vonk
Preceded by Tuomas Ollila	Chief Conductor, Tampere Philharmonic Orchestra; 1998–2006	Succeeded by John Storgårds
