= Estonian National Male Choir =

Choir in Estonia

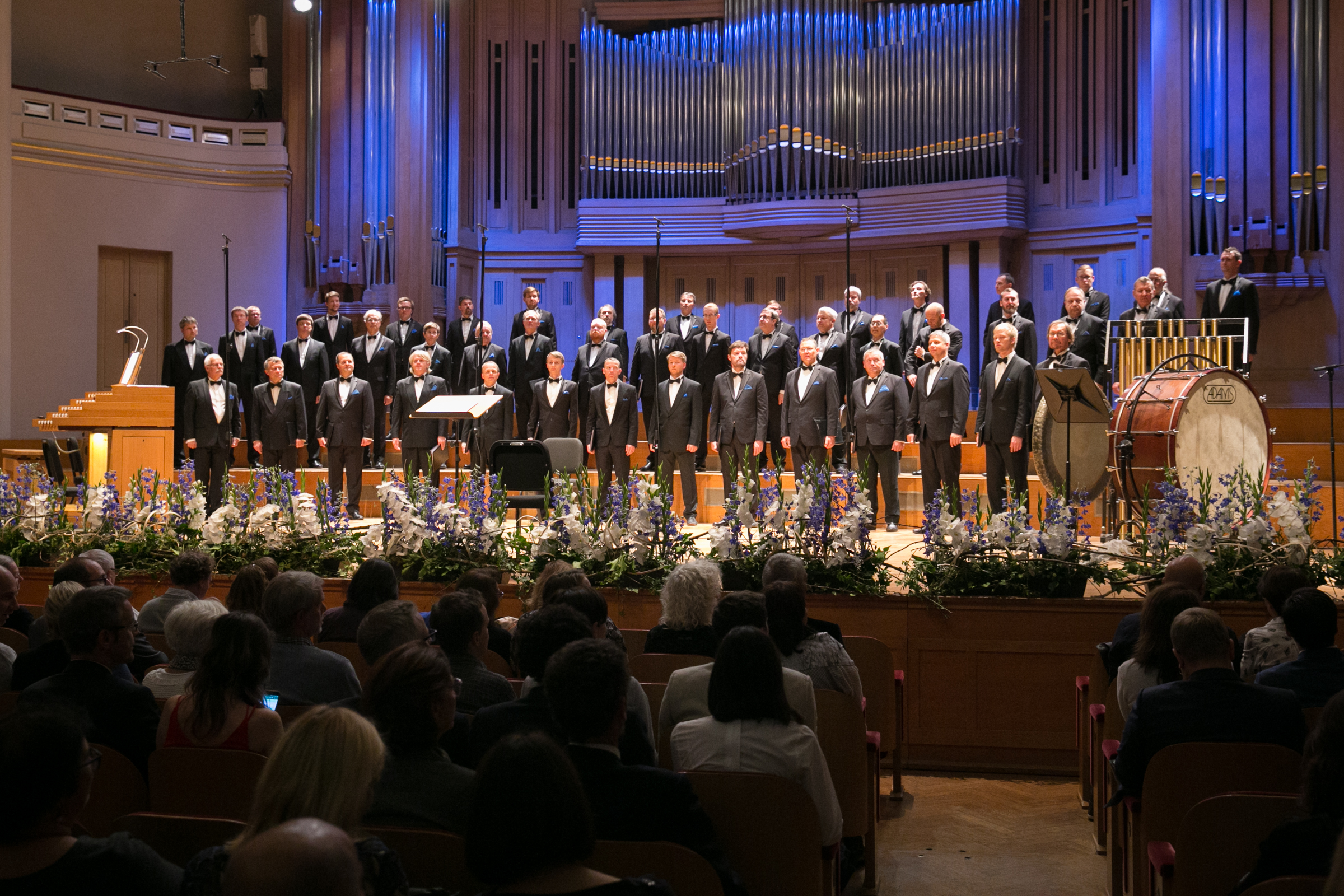
Estonian National Male Choir in Brussels (2017)

Estonian National Male Choir (Estonian: Eesti Rahvusmeeskoor) is an Estonian male choir. As of about 2020, it is the largest full-time professional male choir in the world.

The choir was founded in 1944 by Gustav Ernesaks. At the beginning, the choir was named as Estonian SSR State Philharmonic Male Choir. In 1953, the choir was named to State Academic Male Choir, and since 1989 the choir carries the name Estonian National Male Choir.

Chief conductors:

- 1944–1975 Gustav Ernesaks
- 1964–1991 Olev Oja
- 1966–1990 Kuno Areng
- 1991–1997 Ants Üleoja
- 1994–2005, 2008–2011 Ants Soots
- 2005–2008 Kaspars Putninš
- since 2011/2012 Mikk Üleoja

During its existence of over 60 years, the choir has given over 6000 concerts in Estonia and abroad.

Awards:

- 2004 Grammy Award in the category "Best Choral Performance"
- 2005 Orchestral Album of the Year, voted in BBC Music Magazine
