= Sibelius Hall =

Finnish concert hall

Coordinates: 60°59′42″N 025°39′04″E

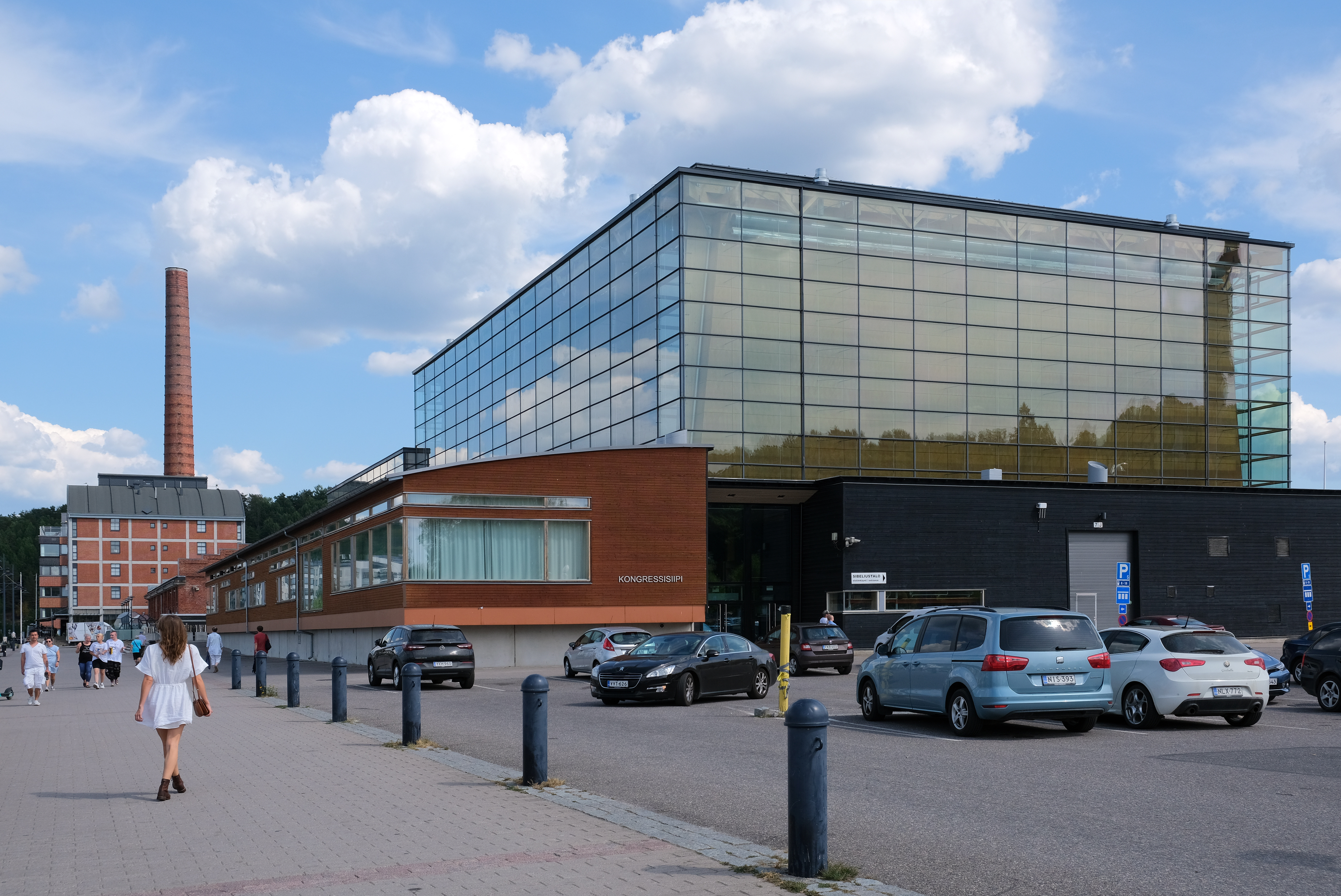
Sibelius Hall exterior

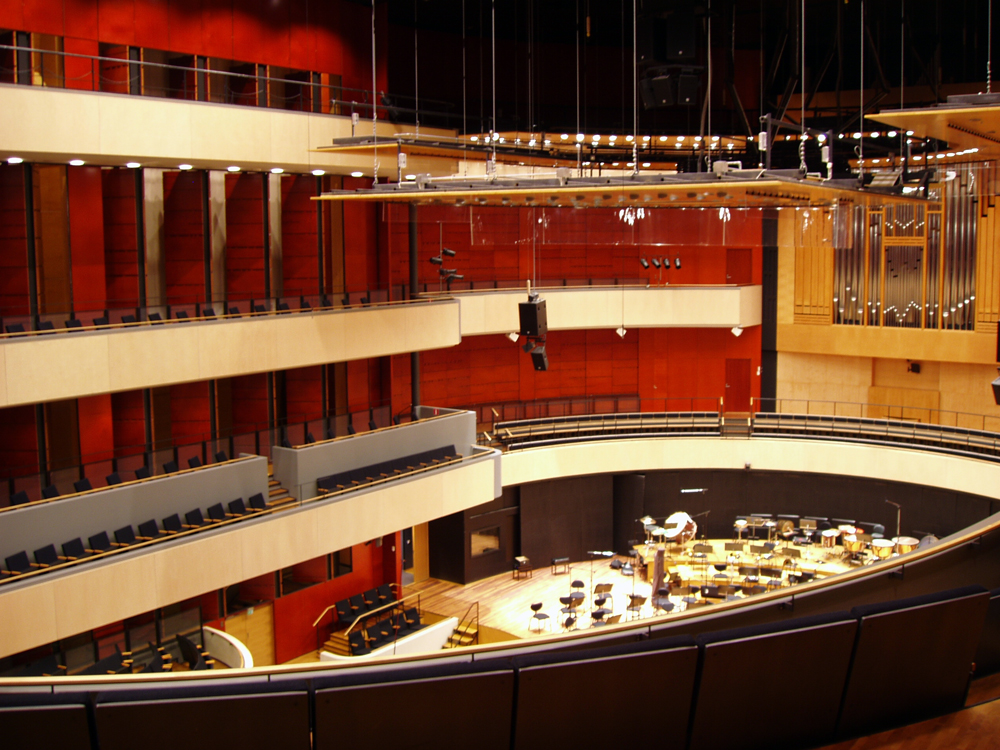
Sibelius Hall interior

The Sibelius Hall (Finnish: Sibeliustalo) is a concert hall in Lahti, Finland, named for the composer Jean Sibelius. The concert hall was completed in 2000. Architects Kimmo Lintula and Hannu Tikka designed the hall, which is made out of glulam. The acoustics were engineered by Artec Consultants, New York. Its acoustics are one of its strongest points, while the architecture follows the Scandinavian tradition of sophisticated design. The concert hall has a capacity of 1,250 seats.

The Sibelius Hall is home to the Lahti Symphony Orchestra.
