= Lahti Symphony Orchestra =

Finnish orchestra

- Symphony orchestra
- Native name: Sinfonia Lahti
- Founded: 1910; 116 years ago
- Location: Lahti, Finland
- Concert hall: Sibelius Hall
- Principal conductor: Nil Venditti (designate, effective autumn 2027)
- Website: Official website

The Lahti Symphony Orchestra (Finnish: Sinfonia Lahti) is a Finnish orchestra based in the city of Lahti in the picturesque Finnish Lakeland. The orchestra has a distinct focus on the works of Finnish composer Jean Sibelius, and has been resident at the acoustically-renowned Sibelius Hall since its completion in March 2000.

The orchestra was founded in 1910, and placed under the control of the Lahti municipality in 1949. It plays (during its regular season) approximately one major concert program per week, and organises annually the widely-regarded Sibelius Festival.

== History, Appointments, Artistic Leadership ==
Past chief conductors of the orchestra include Martti Similä (1951–1957), Urpo Pesonen (1959–1978), Jouko Saari (1978–1984) and Ulf Söderblom (1985–1988). Osmo Vänskä is the longest serving conductor of the orchestra: he became principal guest conductor in 1985, and took over from Soderblom as chief conductor in 1988. During his tenure, he and the orchestra achieved wide acclaim, particularly for their performances and recordings of the symphonies of Finnish composer Jean Sibelius. Other recordings by Vänskä and the orchestra include music of Robert Kajanus and Einojuhani Rautavaara. Vänskä concluded his tenure as Chief Conductor of the orchestra in 2008, and thereafter was made Conductor Laureate.

Jukka-Pekka Saraste served as artistic advisor to the orchestra from August 2008 to July 2011. In April 2009, the orchestra announced the appointment of Okko Kamu as its next chief conductor, from the autumn of 2011, after the conclusion of Saraste's tenure as artistic advisor. Kamu's initial contract was through the spring of 2014. In November 2012, the orchestra announced the extension of Kamu's contract through the end of July 2016, at which time Kamu concluded his tenure as principal conductor.

In August 2015, the orchestra announced the appointment of Dima Slobodeniouk as its next principal conductor, effective in the autumn of 2016, with an initial contract length of 3 seasons. In April 2018, the orchestra announced the extension of Slobodeniouk's contract with the orchestra through 31 July 2021, at which time he concluded his Lahti tenure.

In December 2018, Anja Bihlmaier first guest-conducted the orchestra. In September 2019, the orchestra announced the appointment of Bihlmaier as its next principal guest conductor, effective with the 2020–2021 season, with an initial contract of 3 seasons. Bihlmaier is the first female conductor named to the post.

In 2015, Dalia Stasevska first guest-conducted the orchestra. In May 2020, the orchestra announced the appointment of Stasevska as its next principal conductor, effective from the 2021–2022 season, with an initial contract of 3 seasons. Stasevska is the first female conductor to be named chief conductor of the Lahti Symphony Orchestra. In March 2023, Sinfonia Lahti announced an extension of Stasevska's contract through 31 July 2025. Stasevska concluded her tenure with the Lahti Symphony Orchestra at the close of the 2024–2025 season.

In October 2023, Nil Venditti first guest-conducted the orchestra. In January 2024, the orchestra announced the appointment of Hannu Lintu as its new artistic partner, effective from the autumn of 2025, on an open-ended contract. In September 2026, the orchestra announced the appointment of Venditti as its next chief conductor, effective with the 2027–2028 season, with an initial contract of three seasons.

Kalevi Aho was appointed composer-in-residence for the orchestra in 1992, and the orchestra has recorded many of his recent works.

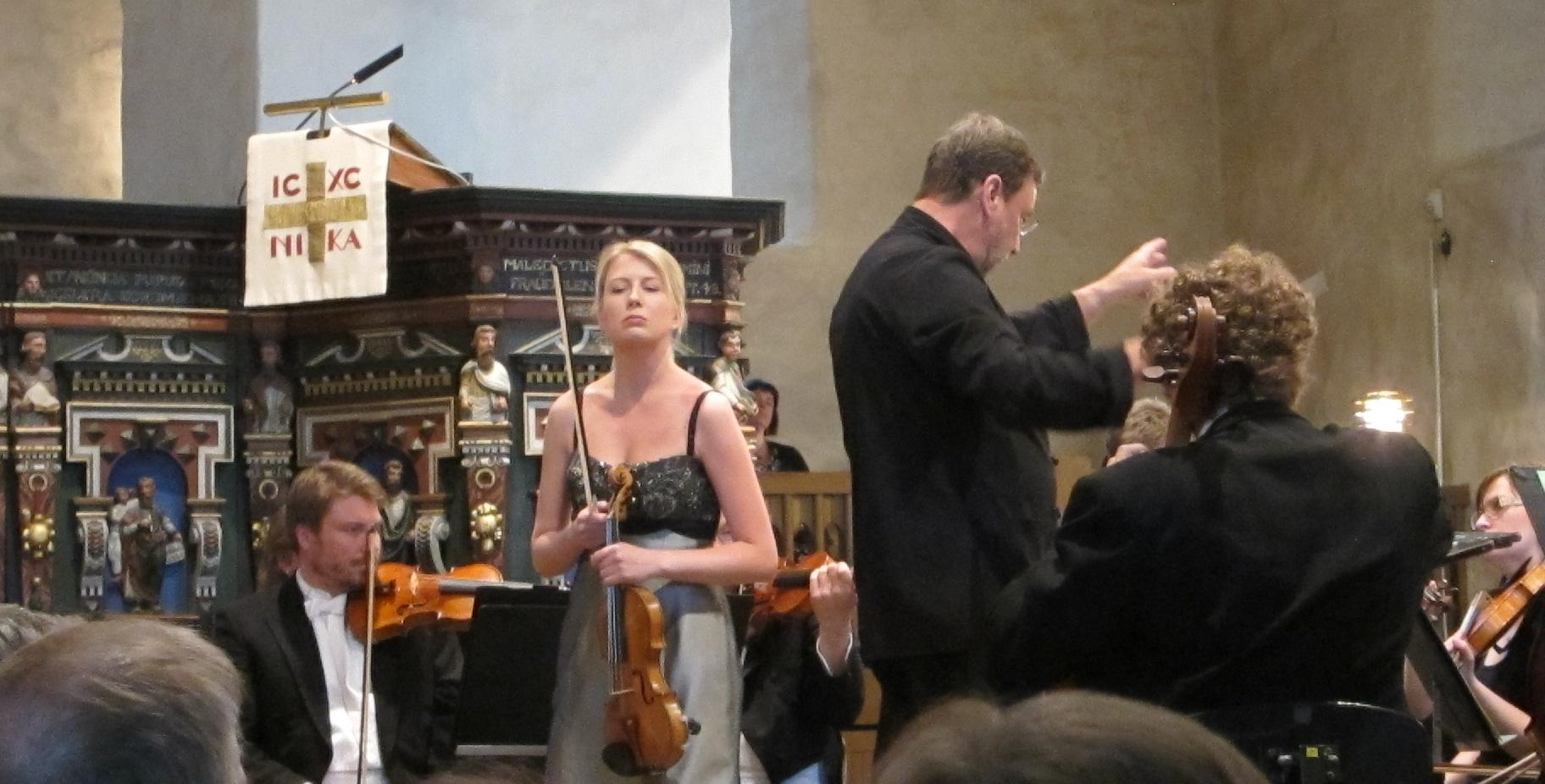
Lahti Symphony Orchestra in 2011

== Chief conductors ==
- Martti Similä (1951–1957)
- Urpo Pesonen (1959–1978)
- Jouko Saari (1978–1984)
- Ulf Söderblom (1985–1988)
- Osmo Vänskä (1988–2008)
- Okko Kamu (2011–2016)
- Dima Slobodeniouk (2016–2021)
- Dalia Stasevska (2021–2025)
- Nil Venditti (designate, effective autumn 2027)

=== Other conductors in leadership positions ===
- Jukka-Pekka Saraste (artistic advisor, 2008–2011)
- Hannu Lintu (artistic partner, 2025–present)
