= Osmo Vänskä =

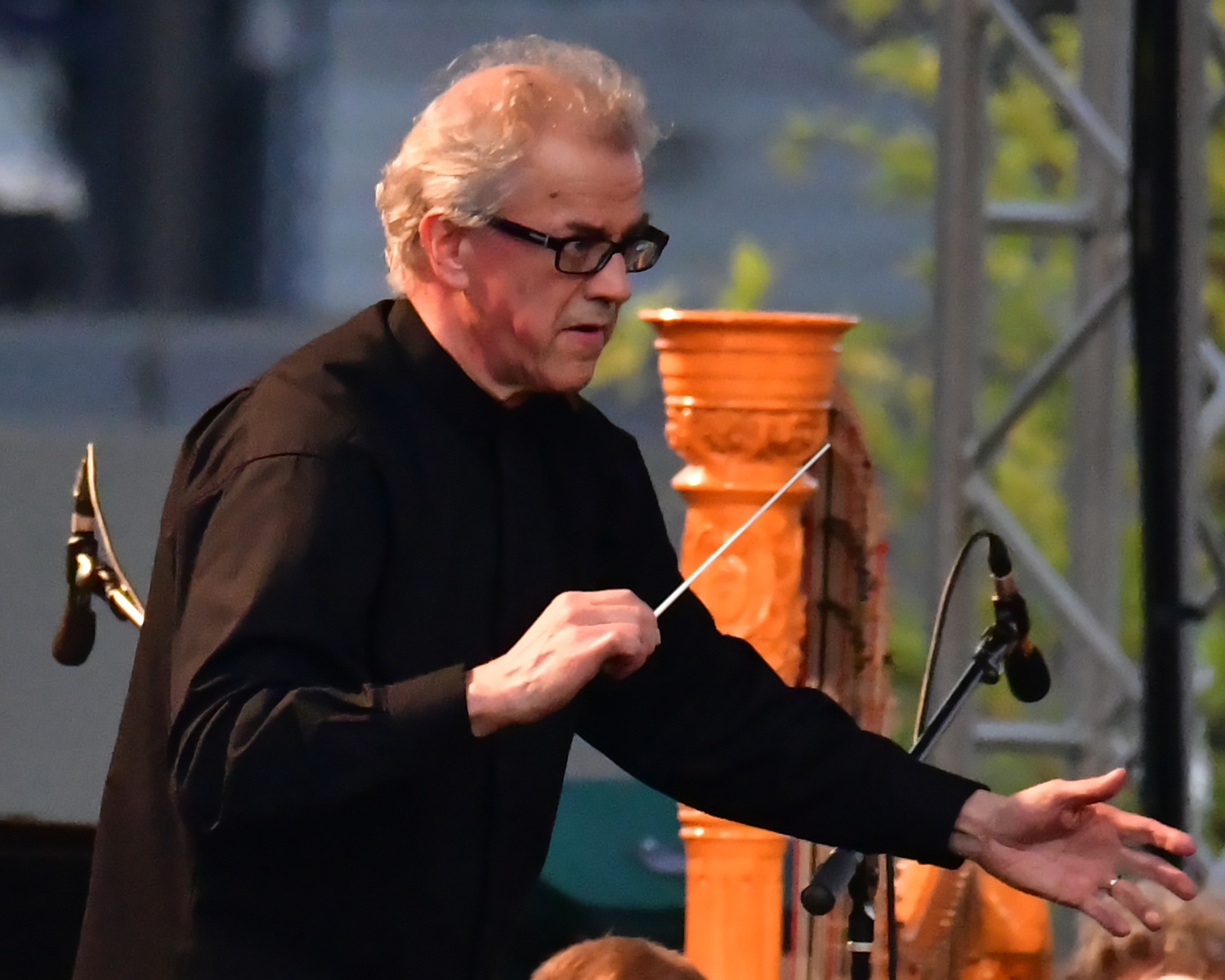
- Vänskä conducting a concert in Minneapolis in 2017

Background information
- Born: Osmo Antero Vänskä; 28 February 1953 (age 73); Sääminki, Finland
- Genre: Classical
- Occupations: Conductor, clarinetist, composer
- Instrument: Clarinet
- Years active: 1971–present
- Formerly of: Minnesota Orchestra Iceland Symphony Orchestra Lahti Symphony Orchestra BBC Scottish Symphony Orchestra Helsinki Philharmonic Turku Philharmonic Seoul Philharmonic

Osmo Antero Vänskä (born 28 February 1953) is a Finnish conductor, clarinetist, and composer.

== Biography ==
Vänskä started his musical career as an orchestral clarinetist with the Turku Philharmonic (1971–76). He then became the principal clarinet of the Helsinki Philharmonic from 1977 to 1982. During this time, he started to study conducting with Jorma Panula at the Sibelius Academy, where his classmates included Esa-Pekka Salonen and Jukka-Pekka Saraste. In 1982, he won the International Besançon Competition for Young Conductors.

Vänskä became principal guest conductor of the Lahti Symphony Orchestra in 1985, and chief conductor in 1988. He concluded his tenure with the Lahti Symphony Orchestra in 2008 and is now the orchestra's conductor laureate. His complete set of Sibelius symphonies with the Lahti Symphony Orchestra, also on the BIS label, has garnered widespread acclaim. He has recorded extensively with the Lahti orchestra for the BIS label, including music by Kalevi Aho, Einojuhani Rautavaara, Bernhard Crusell, Uuno Klami, Tauno Marttinen, Robert Kajanus, Sofia Gubaidulina, Joonas Kokkonen, Jan Sandström, Jean Sibelius, and Fredrik Pacius.

Vänskä was chief conductor of the Iceland Symphony Orchestra from 1993 to 1996. In 1996, he was appointed chief conductor of the BBC Scottish Symphony Orchestra (BBCSSO), and served in that capacity until 2002. With the BBCSSO, he made recordings of the complete Carl Nielsen symphonies for the BIS label. In June 2014, the Iceland Symphony Orchestra announced the return of Vänskä to the orchestra as its next principal guest conductor, effective with the 2014–2015 season.

In 2003, Vänskä became the music director of the Minnesota Orchestra. He and the orchestra have received critical praise, and he is regarded as having enhanced the quality of the orchestra. In 2004, Vänskä and the Minnesota Orchestra began a five-year project to record the complete Beethoven symphonies on the BIS label. In 2005, Vänskä signed a contract extension with the Minnesota Orchestra through at least 2011. In September 2009, the orchestra announced the extension of Vänskä's contract through the 2014–2015 season. He announced his resignation on 1 October 2013, one year after management locked out the musicians in a longstanding labor dispute. In January 2014 Vänskä and the Minnesota Orchestra won a Grammy for best orchestral performance for the album of Sibelius' Symphonies Nos. 1 and 4. He was re-appointed music director of the Minnesota Orchestra in April 2014 with a two-year contract, which was extended in May 2015 to last until August 2019. In July 2017, the orchestra announced a further extension of Vänskä's contract through the 2021–2022 season. In December 2018, the orchestra announced that Vänskä is to conclude his music directorship of the Minnesota Orchestra at the close of the 2021–2022 season. Vänskä is subsequently scheduled to take the title of conductor laureate with the Minnesota Orchestra.

In May 2008, an orchestral piece composed by Vänskä titled The Bridge was premiered by the Metropolitan Symphony Orchestra, led by William Schrickel, assistant-principal bassist of the Minnesota Orchestra, with Vänskä in attendance.

In April 2019, the Seoul Philharmonic Orchestra announced the appointment of Vänskä as its next music director, effective January 2020, with an initial contract of 3 years. Vänskä stood down as music director of the Seoul Philharmonic Orchestra at the end of 2022.

== Personal life ==
Vänskä has been married twice. He and his first wife Pirkko, a freelance drama critic, have three grown children, one of whom, Olli, plays violin in the Finnish folk metal band Korpiklaani. The couple separated in 2009. In April 2015, Vänskä married Erin Keefe, concertmaster of the Minnesota Orchestra. The couple reside in Minneapolis. In private life, one of his hobbies is riding motorcycles.

== Literature ==
- Michael Anthony: Osmo Vänskä: Orchestra Builder. Kirk House Publishers. ISBN 978-1-933794-20-4

Cultural offices
Preceded by Ulf Söderblom	Chief Conductor, Lahti Symphony Orchestra; 1988–2008	Succeeded by Jukka-Pekka Saraste (artistic advisor)
Preceded by Petri Sakari	Chief Conductor, Iceland Symphony Orchestra; 1993–1996	Succeeded by Petri Sakari
Preceded by Jerzy Maksymiuk	Chief Conductor, BBC Scottish Symphony Orchestra; 1996–2002	Succeeded by Ilan Volkov
Preceded by Myung-whun Chung	Music Director, Seoul Philharmonic Orchestra; 2020–2022	Succeeded by Jaap van Zweden (designate, effective 2024)
