= The Lizard (Sibelius) =

Incidental music by Jean Sibelius

- Incidental music by Jean Sibelius
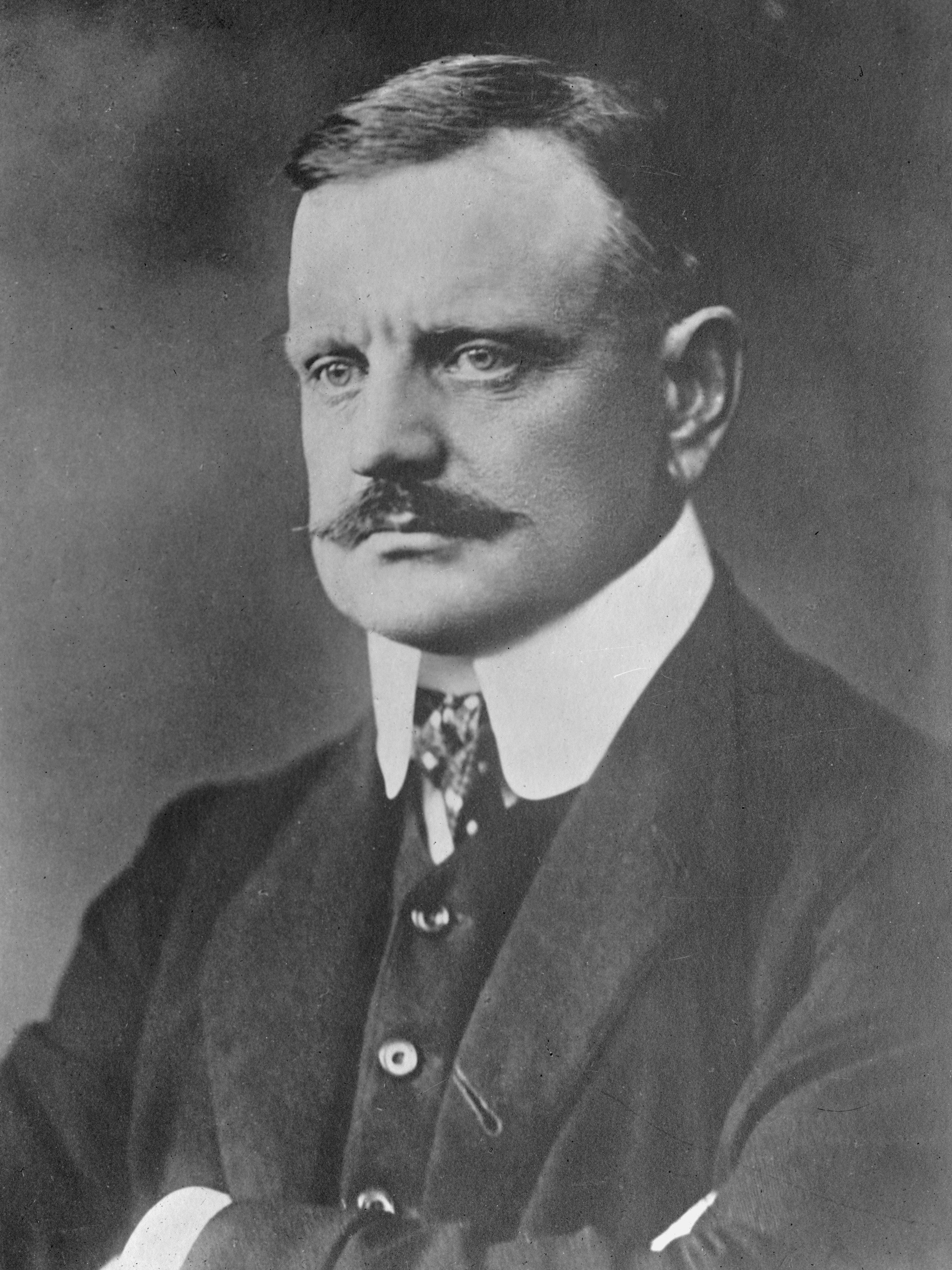
- The composer in 1913
- Native name: Ödlan
- Opus: 8
- Text: Ödlan by Mikael Lybeck
- Composed: 1909
- Publisher: Fazer (1997)
- Duration: Approx. 17 mins.

Premiere
- Date: 6 April 1910
- Location: Swedish Theatre; Helsinki, Grand Duchy of Finland
- Conductor: Jean Sibelius

The Lizard (in Swedish: Ödlan), Op. 8, is a theatre score for string ensemble—comprising six to nine musicians—by the Finnish composer Jean Sibelius; he wrote the music in 1909 to accompany the Finnish author Mikael Lybeck's 1908 three-act, Symbolist play (skådespel) of the same name. The story, which takes place at the Eyringe family estate, is a romantic triangle: Alban, an overly-sensitive nobleman with an artist's soul, is engaged to Elisiv, the tender and virtuous nurse who had cared for his late father; however, he struggles to resist the carnal advances of his older cousin Adla (her name is a near homonym for ödla, the Swedish word for lizard), a cunning temptress whose plot to seduce him turns lethal. Sibelius contributed music for two scenes in Act II: Tableau 1, in which Alban plays his violin at the family burial chapel, hoping to summon his deceased relatives; and Tableau 3, in which Elisiv during a fever dream hears "strange" music and, later with three Eyringe ghosts, ponders the thin line between life and death.

The play premiered on 6 April 1910 at the Swedish Theatre in Helsinki; Gustaf Molander and Karin Molander created the roles of Alban and Elisiv, respectively, while the Swedish actress Valborg Hansson guest starred as Adla. During Act II, Sibelius conducted the chamber ensemble, which for effect he positioned behind the stage. The critics praised Sibelius's music as having fit the mood of the play well. Nevertheless, the production folded after just six performances, and The Lizard was never revived in Sibelius's lifetime. Although it was Sibelius's habit to excerpt suites from his theatre scores (as he had with, for example, King Christian II in 1898, Pelléas et Mélisande in 1905, Belshazzar's Feast in 1907, and Swanwhite in 1908), he never did so with The Lizard. Scholars speculate that this is because the music is dependent on the play's action.

The composer thought highly of his contribution to The Lizard, describing it to his patron and confidant Axel Carpelan as "one of the most exquisite works I have written". Stylistically, Sibelius deploys chromaticism to achieve a darkly-colored and dream-like palette. The Lizard comes from Sibelius's "crisis period" (1908–1912) and is therefore a 'psychological' work comparable to the string quartet Voces intimae (1909) and the Fourth Symphony (1911).

In the intervening decades, The Lizard has entered neither the Finnish nor the international repertories, and its significance is therefore primarily as a historical curiosity: Sibelius's lone theatre score for chamber ensemble. Accordingly, it has been recorded only a few times, with Juha Kangas and the Ostrobothnian Chamber Orchestra having made the world premiere studio recording in 1994. A typical performance lasts about 17 minutes.

== History ==
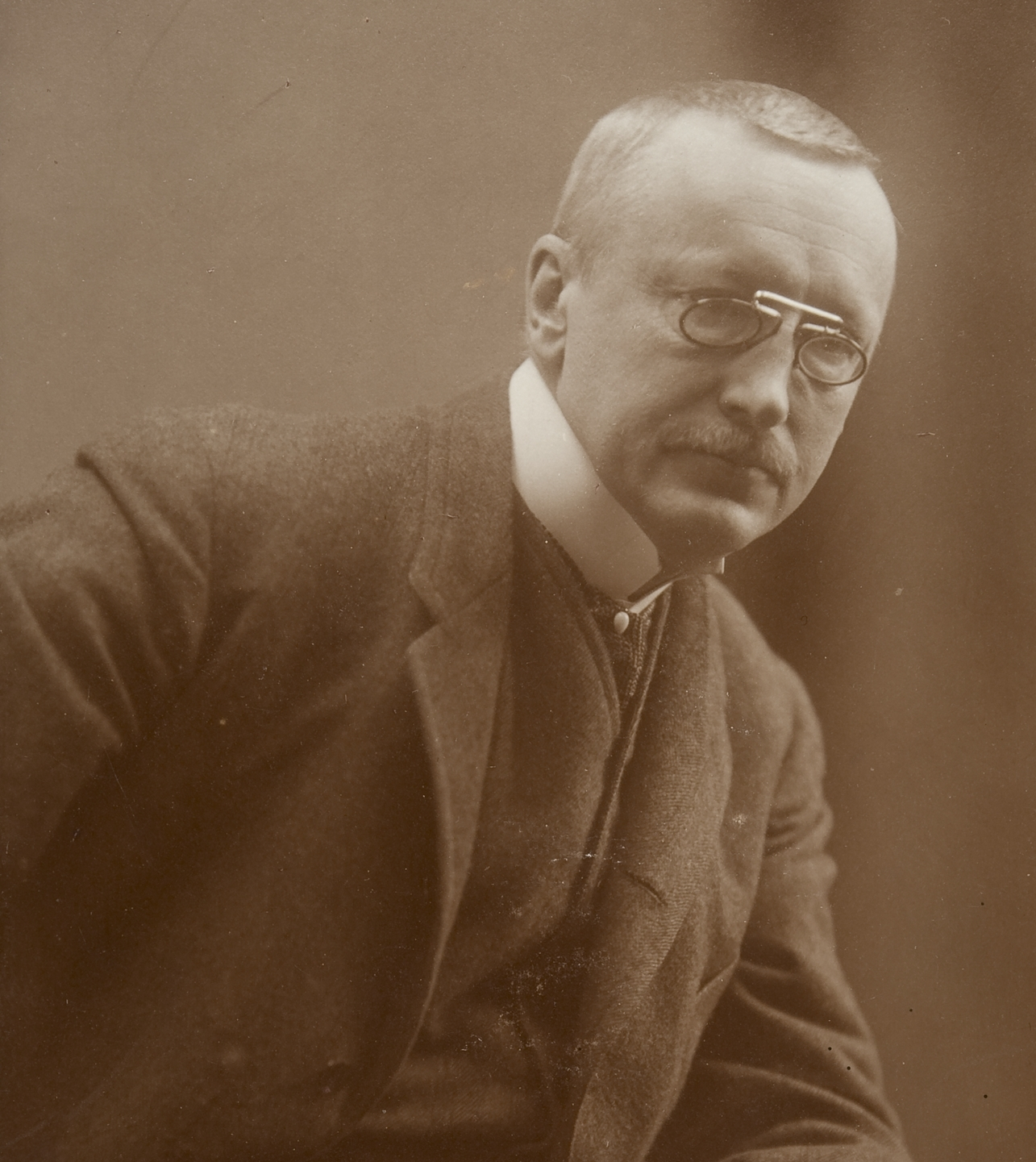
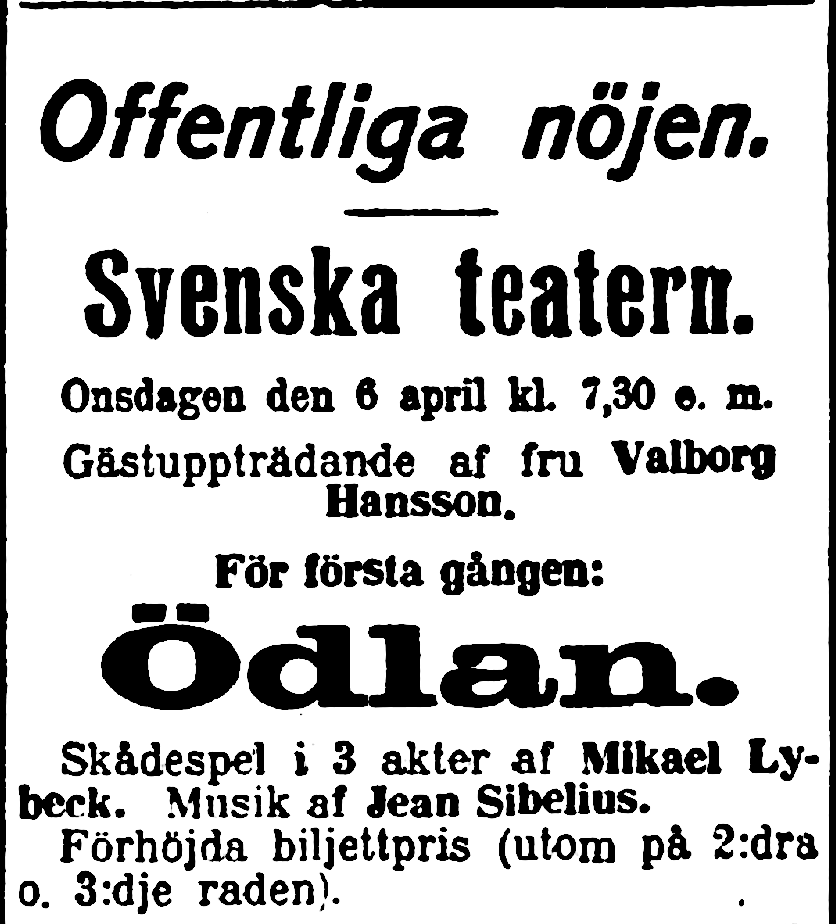
Mikael Lybeck

=== Composition ===
Lybeck began writing The Lizard in 1907 and completed it in 1908; published by Albert Bonnier (Stockholm), the book became available to the public on 20 November 1908. The Finnish literary critics received the play positively, praising in particular the author's concise prose and—surprisingly, given his inexperience in the genre—sure sense for the dramatic; nevertheless, several wondered whether The Lizard could be staged successfully, given its dreamlike scenes and Lybeck's extensive stage directions. Sibelius read the play with alacrity and wrote to Lybeck of its impact.

=== Premiere ===
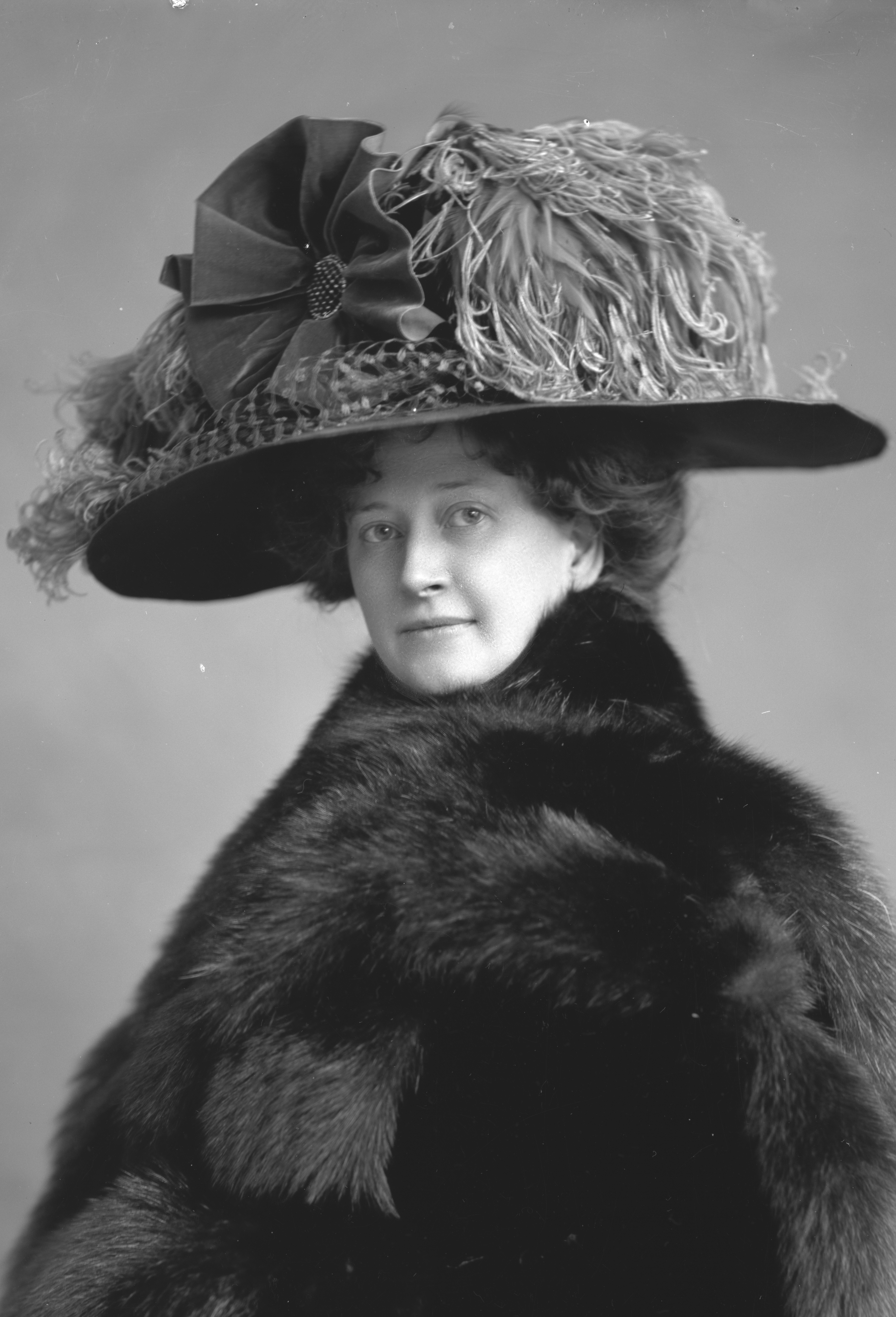
The Swedish actresses Valborg Hansson (left) and Karin Molander (right) created the roles of Adla and Elisiv, respectively, for the 6 April 1910 premiere at the Swedish Theatre.

The fact that Sibelius had contributed original music tended to increase any play's box office.

At the premiere, the ensemble consisted of seven musicians: two first violins (including Victor Carnier, who took the violin solo in Tableau 1), one second violin, one viola, two cellos (one of whom was Bror Persfelt), and one contrabass.

The contract Sibelius signed with Lybeck in 1909 stipulated that the latter would, in exchange for a fee, own the rights to the incidental music. As such, after The Lizard's six performances in 1910, Lybeck took possession of the autograph score and parts. With the playwright's death on 11 October 1925, the music became part of his estate, with which it remained until 1960 when his heirs donated the materials to the Sibelius Museum in Turku. The autograph score is an important historical document because it contains extensive rehearsal markings in the composer's hand. The Lizard finally was published—over 80 years after its premiere—in 1997 by Edition Fazer (now Fennica Gehrman); the publisher advertises the "delicate" score as "Sibelius at his most enchanting ... with "chromatic and whole note motifs and mysterious string tremolos [that] are a direct forerunner of Tapiola.

== Lybeck's play ==
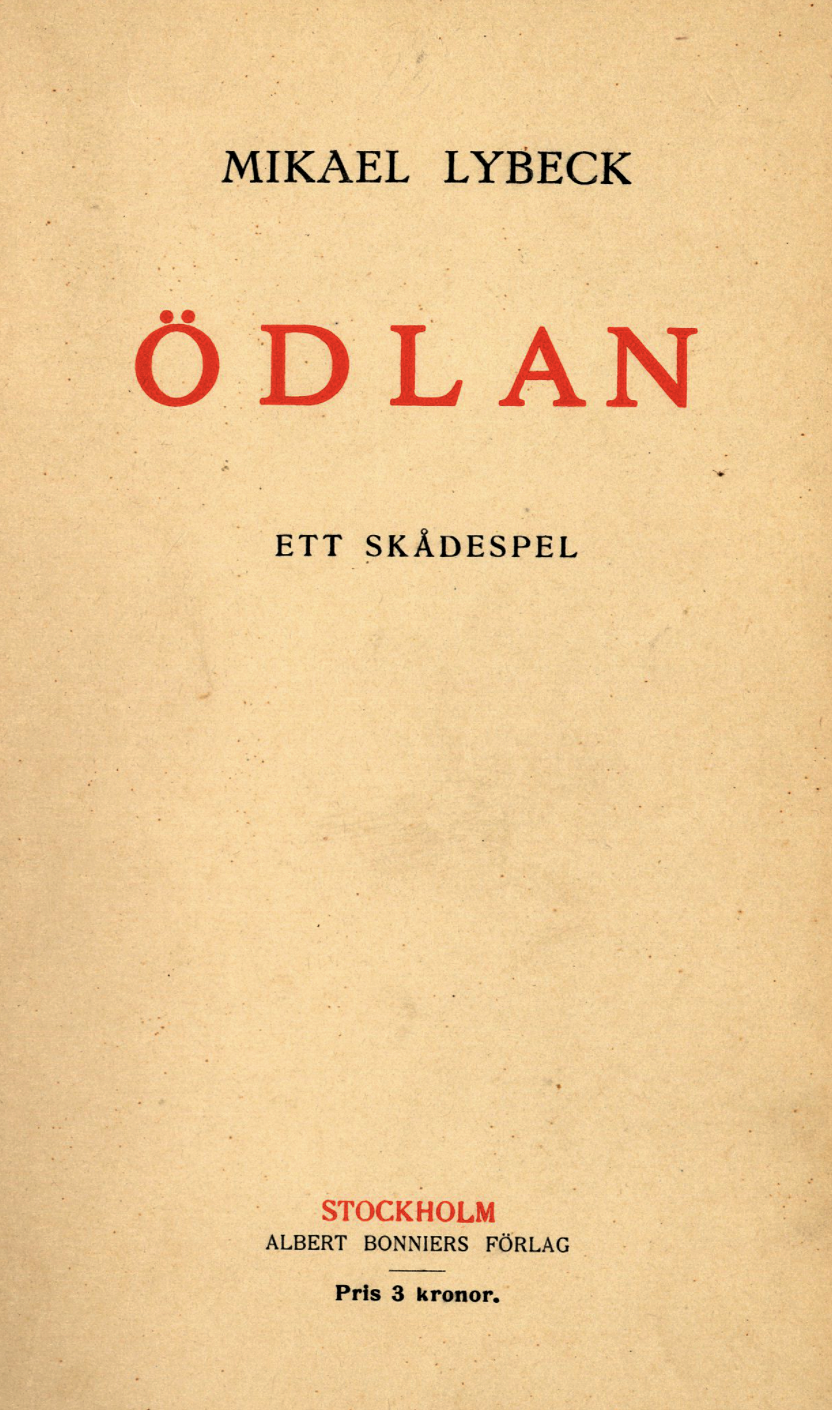
Ödlan, a Symbolist drama, was Lybeck's first play (1908); it earned positive reviews.

=== Structure and roles ===
The Lizard is a stage drama in three acts, of which Act II is subdivided further into three tableaux. Sibelius's incidental music is played in Tableau 1 (near the end of the scene) and Tableau 3 (the entirety of the scene). The play includes ten roles, three principal—Alban, Elisiv, and Adla—and seven minor. These are as follows:

Roles	Description	Appearances (Note: In Act II, Tableau 2, Alban does not appear on-stage, but his voice is heard off-stage. In Act III, Elisiv appears on-stage (bed-ridden, with eyes closed), but does not speak. Also in Act III, Leonard does not appear on-stage, but his voice is heard off-stage.)	Premiere cast (6 April 1910)
Alban	A young count, last of the Eyringe; fiancé of Elisiv	Acts I, II:1–2, III	Gustaf Molander
Elisiv	A young nurse; fiancée of Alban	Acts I, II:1–3, III	Karin Molander
Adla	Alban's older cousin and daughter of Elisabet	Acts I, II:2, III	Valborg Hansson
Baltsar	Uncle of Alban and brother of Alida	Acts I, II:2	Ernst Ahlbom
Bolivar	Uncle of Alban and brother of Alida	Acts I, II:2	Mauritz Svedberg
Ben	Uncle of Alban and brother of Alida; a doctor	Acts I, II:2, III	Albert Nycop
Leonard	An old, faithful servant	Acts I, II:2, III	"Herr Precht"
Ottokar	Father of Alban (appears as a ghost)	Act II:3	Hjalmar Peters
Elisabet	Mother of Alda and first wife of Ottokar (appears as a ghost)	Act II:3	Svea Peters
Alida	Mother of Alban and second wife of Ottokar (appears as a ghost)	Act II:3	"Fru Sjöblom"

The entire play takes place at the Eyringe family estate:

- Act I: The terrace room of the family mansion
- Act II, Tableau 1: The burial chapel^{†}
- Act II, Tableau 2: The terrace room
- Act II, Tableau 3: Within Elisiv's fever dream^{†}
- Act III: Elisiv's bedchamber

† Includes music by Sibelius.

=== Synopsis ===
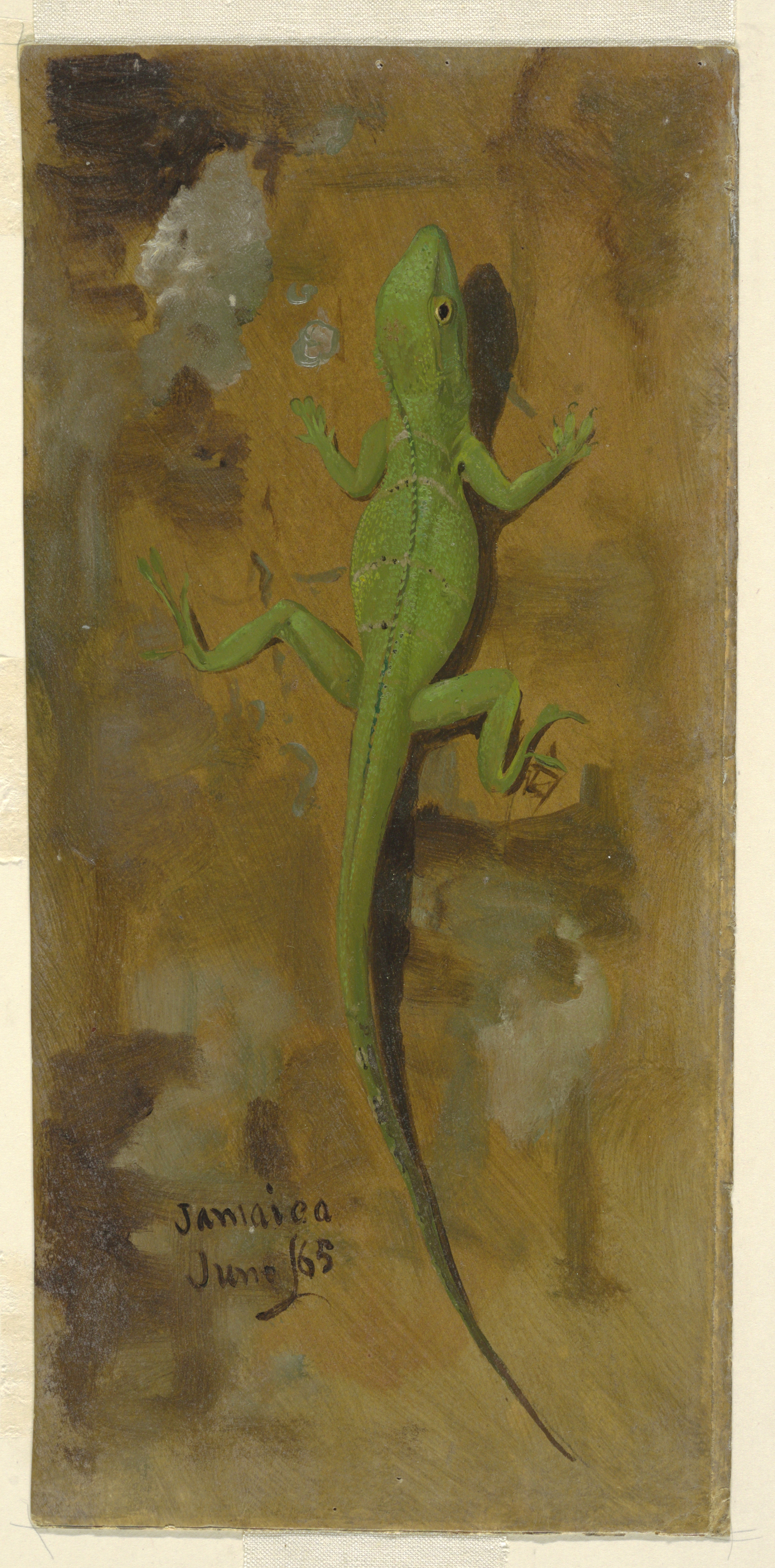
In the play, the green lizard—which features on the Eyringe coat of arms, surrounded by 16 white stars—symbolizes evil.

The principal character in the play, Count Alban, is engaged to Elisiv, who represents everything that is pure. But, Adla —word that resembles to Ödlan or lizard— symbolizes evil and arouses both fear and passion in Alban. Elisiv and Adla both struggle to keep Alban's soul on their side. Elisiv trips, falls, and perishes in the struggle, but in revenge, Alban kills the evil that exists within himself - i.e. Adla.

== Music ==
The Lizard is scored for violin solo and small string ensemble, consisting of a minimum of five additional players: 2 violins, viola, cello, and double bass. Sibelius also stipulated that there should be no more than nine players total.

- Adagio—Più adagio, to Act II, Tableau 1
- Grave—Adagio, to Act II, Tableau 3
Measures 1–6 of Tableau 1
Measures 1–5 of Tableau 3

== Discography ==
The Finnish conductor Juha Kangas and the Ostrobothnian Chamber Orchestra made the world premiere studio recording in the autumn of 1994 for Finlandia Records (now Warner Classics). (Note: Nevertheless, Finlandia did not release the Kangas recording until 1996. In the interim, Tapio Tuomela and Folkwang Kammerorchester Essen recorded The Lizard in January 1995, which Koch Schwann released the same year. As such, the Tuomela recording was the first to be available to the public.) Critics largely have received The Lizard positively. Erik Levi, who reviewed the Kangas recording for BBC Music Magazine, noted that the "strangely withdrawn" music to The Lizard was one of the few of Sibelius's compositions for strings to have "reach[ed] the compositional heights of the symphonies and tone poems". In his review of the Segerstam recording, Gramophone's Andrew Achenbach declared The Lizard a "fascinating discovery ... luminously scored ... containing much duskily beautiful and splendidly atmospheric invention, not to mention some fascinating harmonic and textural foreshadowings of Tapiola". Similarly, Rob Barnett of MusicWeb International found The Lizard—with its "inky expressionist caverns"—"fascinating ... sinister stuff ... likely to puzzle the Sibelian generalist". On the other hand, David Hurwitz with Classics Today characterizes The Lizard as "all atmosphere and repetition of brief melodic patterns ... something moody that never forces you to pay attention". As such, he concludes, Sibelius was probably wise to never fashion a concert suite from the incidental music: "It would have been nearly impossible ... There's very little actual music here". The sortable table below lists all commercially available recordings of The Lizard:

No.	Conductor	Ensemble	Rec. (Note: Refers to the year in which the performers recorded the work; this may not be the same as the year in which the recording was first released to the general public.)	Time	Recording venue	Label	Ref.
1	Juha Kangas	Ostrobothnian Chamber Orchestra (Note: The liner notes to this recording do not specify the name of the violin soloist in the first movement.)	1994	19:29	Kaustinen Church	Finlandia	(Note: J. Kangas–Finlandia (4509–98995–2) 1996)
2	Tapio Tuomela	Folkwang Kammerorchester Essen (Note: The violin solo is taken by Pekka Kauppinen.)	1995	13:39	Festhalle Viersen	Koch Schwann	(Note: T. Tuomela–Koch Schwann (3–1786–2) 1995)
3	—	Various performers (Note: The BIS recording utilizes the minimum ensemble size of six, as stipulated by Sibelius. The violin solo is taken by Laura Vikman, while the other instrumentalists are: Jaakko Kuusisto, violin I; Jyrki Lasonpalo, violin II; Anna Kreetta Gribajcevic, viola; Taneli Turunen, cello; and Eero Munter, double bass.)	2006	17:05	Kuusankoski Hall	BIS	(Note: BIS (CD–2065) 2013)
4	Leif Segerstam	Turku Philharmonic Orchestra	2014	25:50	Turku Concert Hall	Naxos	(Note: L. Segerstam–Naxos (8.573341) 2015)

== Notes, references, and sources ==
Notes

Books

- Barnett, Andrew (2007). Sibelius. New Haven, Connecticut: Yale University Press. ISBN 978-0-300-16397-1.
- Ekman, Karl [in Finnish] (1938) [1935]. Jean Sibelius: His Life and Personality. Translated by Birse, Edward. New York: Alfred A. Knopf. OCLC 896231.
- Goss, Glenda Dawn (2009). Sibelius: A Composer's Life and the Awakening of Finland. Chicago: University of Chicago Press. ISBN 978-0-226-00547-8.
- Grimley, Daniel (2021). Jean Sibelius: Life, Music, Silence. Reaktion Books. ISBN 978-1-78914-466-6.
- Johnson, Harold (1959). Jean Sibelius (1st ed.). New York: Alfred A. Knopf. OCLC 603128.
- Kallberg, Jeffrey (2011). "Theatrical Sibelius: The Melodramatic Lizard". In Grimley, Daniel (ed.). Jean Sibelius and His World. Princeton: Princeton University Press. pp. 74–88. ISBN 978-0-691-15281-3.
- Kurki, Eija (2001). "Sibelius and the Theater: A Study of the Incidental Music for Symbolist Plays". In Jackson, Timothy; Veijo, Murtomäki (eds.). Sibelius Studies. Cambridge: Cambridge University Press. pp. 76–9434. ISBN 978-0-521-62416-9.
- Lybeck, Mikael [in Finnish] (1908). Ödlan: Ett skådespel [The Lizard: A Drama] (in Swedish). Stockholm: Albert Bonnier.
- Rickards, Guy (1997). Jean Sibelius. (20th-century Composers Series). London: Phaidon. ISBN 978-0-714-83581-5.
- Tawaststjerna, Erik (2008a) [1972; trans. 1986]. Sibelius: Volume II, 1904–1914. Translated by Layton, Robert. London: Faber and Faber. ISBN 978-0-571-24773-8.
- Tawaststjerna, Erik (2008b) [1978/1988; trans. 1997]. Sibelius: Volume III, 1914–1957. Translated by Layton, Robert. London: Faber and Faber. ISBN 978-0-571-24774-5.

Liner notes

- Korhonen, Kimmo [in Finnish] (1996). Sibelius: Works for String Orchestra (CD booklet). Translated by Mäntyjärvi, Jaakko [in Finnish]. Juha Kangas & Ostrobothnian Chamber Orchestra. Finlandia. p. 4–6. 4509–98995–2. OCLC 38214359
- Wells, Dominic (2015). Sibelius: Swanwhite / The Lizard / A Lonely Ski Trail / The Countess' Portrait (CD booklet). Leif Segerstam & Turku Philharmonic Orchestra. Naxos. p. 3–4. 8.573341. OCLC 922995811

Journals and magazines

- Grandison, Emil [in Swedish] (1915). "Gustaf och Karin Molander" [Gustaf and Karin Molander]. In Roosval, Albin [in Swedish] (ed.). Scenisk Konst: Fjortonde Årgången [Scenis Art: Fourteenth Year] (in Swedish). Vol. 14. Stockholm: Fröleén and Co. p. 26.

Newspapers (by date)

- "Hj. L. [Lenning, Hjalmar] [in Finnish] (21 November 1908). "Mikael Lybecks skådespel Ödlan" [Mikael Lybeck's play The Lizard]. Hufvudstadsbladet (in Swedish). No. 319. p. 5.
- "E. Lds." [Lodenius, Elias] [in Finnish] (25 November 1908). "Mikael Lybecks nya bok" [Mikael Lybeck's new book]. Nya Pressen (in Swedish). No. 320. p. 3.
- "Habitué" [Hirn, Julius] [in Finnish] (5 April 1910). "Svenska teatern: Morgondagens premiär" [The Swedish Theatre: Tomorrow's premiere]. Nya Pressen (in Swedish). No. 75. p. 3.
- "Bis" [Wasenius, Karl] [in Finnish] (6 April 1910). "Jean Sibelius' musik till "Ödlan" af Mikael Lybeck" [The music of Jean Sibelius to "The Lizard" by Mikael Lybeck]. Hufvudstadsbladet (in Swedish). No. 91. p. 10–11.
- "Hj. L. [Lenning, Hjalmar] (7 April 1910). "Svenska teatern: Fru Valborg Hanssons gästspel, "Ödlan"" [The Swedish Theatre: Ms. Valborg Hansson's guest performance, "The Lizard"]. Hufvudstadsbladet (in Swedish). No. 92. p. 7.
- "Habitué" [Hirn, Julius] (7 April 1910). "Premiären af "Ödlan" på Svenska teatern" [The premiere of "The Lizard" at the Swedish Theatre]. Nya Pressen (in Swedish). No. 77. p. 4.

Websites

- "Musik till skådesspelet "Ödlan"" [Music for the Play "The Lizard"]. fennicagehrman.fi. Fennica Gehrman. 2015.
- Achenbach, Andrew (2015). "Sibelius: Swanwhite / The Lizard – Complete Incidental Music". gramophone.co.uk. Gramophone.
- Barnett, Rob (2014). "Review: The Unknown Sibelius". musicweb-international.com. MusicWeb International.
- Hurwitz, David. "Swanwhite Meets The Lizard". classicstoday.com. Classics Today.
- Kurki, Eija (2018). "Belshazzar's Feast and The Lizard: Exoticism, Snake Dances, Violin Playing and Ghosts". SibeliusOne.com. Sibelius One.
- Levi, Erik (2012). "Sibelius: The Lizard—incidental music; Suite in D minor, Op. 117; Rakastava". classical-music.com. BBC Music Magazine.
- Sirén, Vesa [in Finnish]. "Incidental music: Op. 8 Ödlan (The Lizard)". sibelius.fi. Finnish Club of Helsinki.
