= Overture in E major and Ballet Scene =

Abandoned early symphonic project by Jean Sibelius (1891)

Overture in E major & Ballet Scene
- Abandoned symphony by Jean Sibelius
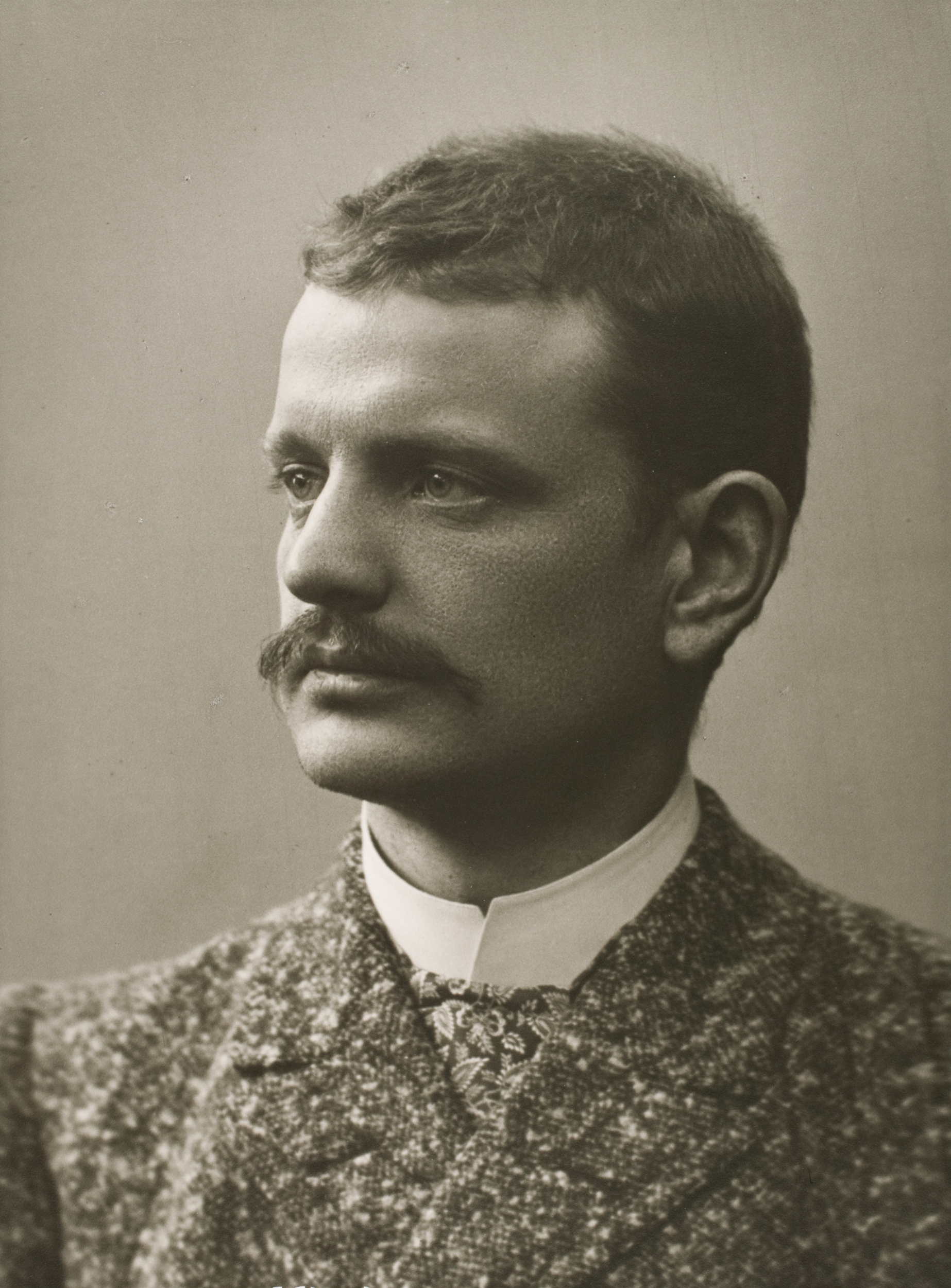
- The composer (c. 1891)
- Catalogue: JS 145 and 163
- Composed: 1891
- Publisher: Fazer Music (1997)
- Duration: 11 minutes (JS 145); 8 minutes (JS 163)

Premiere
- Date: 23 April 1891 (JS 145); 28 April 1891 (JS 163)
- Location: Helsinki, Grand Duchy of Finland
- Conductor: Robert Kajanus
- Performers: Helsinki Orchestral Association

The Overture in E major and Ballet Scene (in French: Scène de ballet), (Note: In Swedish: Ouvertyr and Balettscen; in Finnish: Uvertyyri and Baletti-osa.) respectively JS 145 and 163, are two single-movement works for orchestra written in 1891 by the Finnish composer Jean Sibelius while he was a postgraduate student studying in Vienna. The Overture received its premiere on 23 April 1891 in Helsinki with the Finnish conductor Robert Kajanus conducting the Helsinki Orchestral Association; five days later, Kajanus and his orchestra premiered Ballet Scene. Sibelius, who remained overseas, was unable to attend either concert. (Shortly after mailing the manuscripts to Finland, Sibelius was overcome with self-doubt and had written to Kajanus begging, to no avail, to have the pieces removed from the program.)

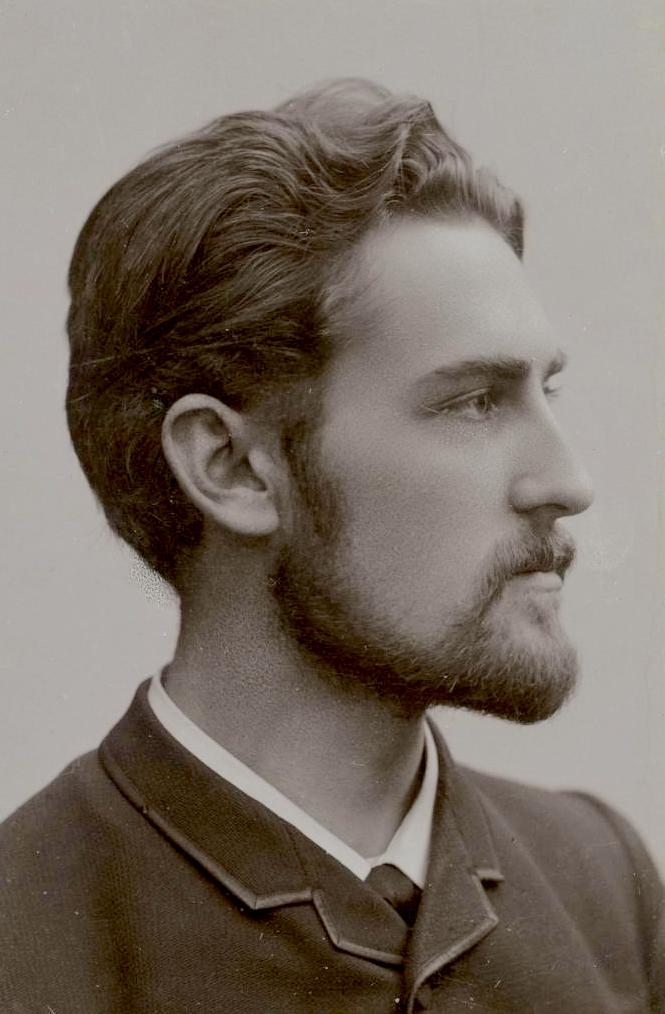
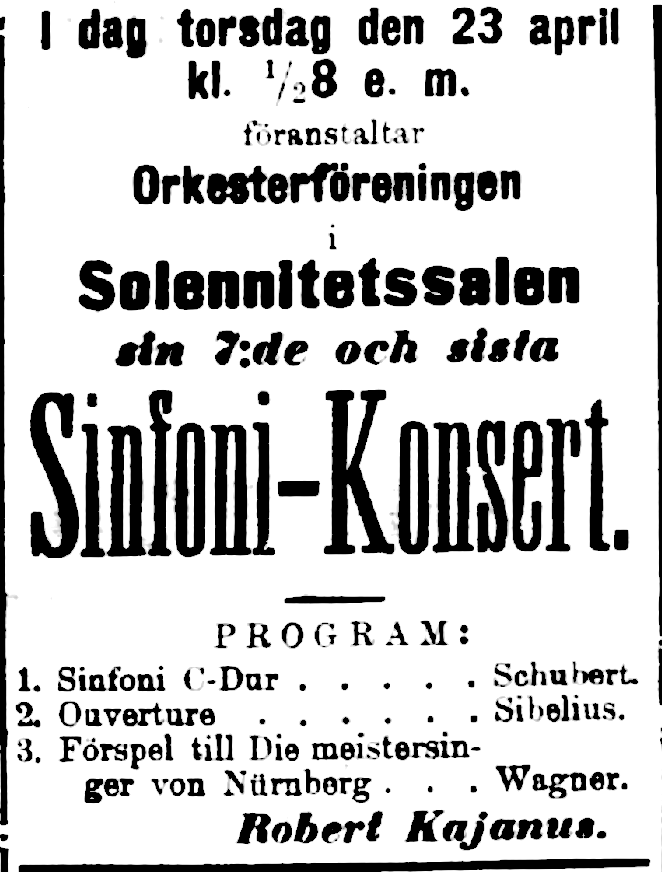
The Finnish conductor Robert Kajanus (left) premiered both the Overture in E major (ad right) and the Ballet Scene

The Overture and Ballet Scene are notable for two reasons. First, they are Sibelius's earliest compositions for orchestra (prior to them, he had mainly written chamber music, pieces for solo piano, and a few songs), which eventually became his chosen medium of artistic expression. Second, Sibelius had conceived of the two pieces as Movements I and II in a first symphony, although he abandoned this ambition in April 1891 and converted them into stand-alone concert items. The Overture and Ballet Scene thus demonstrate that, already in Vienna, Sibelius was thinking symphonically, and indeed, a year later in 1892, he premiered the five-movement choral symphony Kullervo (Op. 7). The Symphony No. 1 in E minor (Op. 39) arrived in 1899.

== Instrumentation ==
The Overture in E major is scored for the following instruments, organized by family (woodwinds, brass, percussion, and strings):

- 2 flutes, 2 oboes, 2 clarinets, and 2 bassoons
- 4 horns, 2 trumpets, 2 trombones, and tuba
- timpani, cymbals, and triangle
- violins (I and II), violas, cellos, and double basses

The Ballet Scene, on the other hand, is one of the most luxuriously scored orchestral works in Sibelius's oeuvre. To the forces listed above for the Overture, it subtracts timpani from the percussion section but adds castanets; moreover, both flutes double piccolo, while one oboist and one clarinetist switch, respectively, to cor anglais and bass clarinet.

== Discography ==
The Estonian-American conductor Neeme Järvi and the Gothenburg Symphony Orchestra made the world premiere studio recordings of the Overture in E minor and Ballet Scene (both then still in manuscript) in 1989 for BIS. The table below lists this and other commercially available recordings:

| No. | Ensemble | Conductor | Rec. (Note: Refers to the year in which the performers recorded the work; this may not be the same as the year in which the recording was first released to the general public.) | Runtime (Note: All runtimes are official, as printed on CD or LP liner notes.) | | Recording venue | Label | Ref. |
| No. | Ensemble | Conductor | Rec. | JS 145 | JS 163 | Recording venue | Label | Ref. |
|---|---|---|---|---|---|---|---|---|
| 1 | Neeme Järvi | Gothenburg Symphony Orchestra | 1989 | 10:40 | 7:46 | Gothenburg Concert Hall | BIS | (Note: N. Järvi–BIS (CD–472) 1990) |
| 2 | Atso Almila | Kuopio Symphony Orchestra | 1998 | 11:34 | 8:23 | Kuopio Music Centre | Finlandia | (Note: A. Almila–Finlandia (3984–23391–2) 1999) |
| 3 | Osmo Vänskä | Lahti Symphony Orchestra | 2004 | 11:17 | 8:36 | Sibelius Hall | BIS | (Note: O. Vänskä–BIS (CD–1565) 2006) |
| 4 | Leif Segerstam | Turku Philharmonic Orchestra | 2014 | 11:41 | 7:59 | Turku Concert Hall | Naxos | (Note: L. Segerstam–Naxos (8.573300) 2015) |

== Notes, references, and sources ==
Notes

Sources

- Barnett, Andrew (2007). Sibelius. New Haven: Yale University Press. ISBN 978-0-300-11159-0.
- Dahlström, Fabian [in Swedish] (2003). Jean Sibelius: Thematisch-bibliographisches Verzeichnis seiner Werke [Jean Sibelius: A Thematic Bibliographic Index of His Works] (in German). Wiesbaden: Breitkopf & Härtel. ISBN 3-7651-0333-0.
- Tawaststjerna, Erik (2008) [1965/1967; trans. 1976]. Sibelius: Volume I, 1865–1905. Translated by Layton, Robert. London: Faber and Faber. ISBN 9780571247721.
