= 2017 Turku attack =

Terrorist attack in Turku, Finland

- A police officer kneeling beside Abderrahman Bouanane at 16:24 after he was detained (Note: Time from the photograph's metadata and information from the following sources:)

- Turku (Finland)
- Location: 60°27′07″N 022°15′59″E; Between Market Square and Puutori, central Turku, Finland
- Date: 18 August 2017; 9 years ago 16:02 – 16:05 (EET (UTC+3))
- Target: Civilian pedestrians
- Attack type: Stabbing, Islamic terrorist attack
- Weapon: Two kitchen knives
- Deaths: 2
- Injuries: 9 (Including the perpetrator)
- Perpetrator: Abderrahman Bouanane
- Defender: Hassan Zubier
- Motive: ISIS-inspired Islamic extremism; revenge for Western airstrikes during the 2017 Battle of Raqqa
- Convictions: 2 counts of murder with terrorist intent; 8 counts of attempted murder with terrorist intent

On 18 August 2017, a mass stabbing took place in Turku, Finland. Two people were killed and eight others were injured before the perpetrator, 22-year-old Abderrahman Bouanane, was detained. In June 2018, he was found guilty of two counts of murder with terrorist intent and eight counts of attempted murder with terrorist intent, receiving a sentence of life imprisonment.

Boaunane, a Moroccan rejected asylum seeker, had been using the alias Abderrahman Mechkah, which was later discovered to be a false identity. Bouanane reportedly identified as a soldier of the Islamic State (ISIS). He had been radicalised three months before the stabbing took place. During the investigation, ISIS propaganda material and a video of him reciting a manifesto was discovered among his possessions. The attack was the first Islamic terrorist act in Finland as well as the first crime in the country to be legally classified as a terrorist incident.

== Background ==
Finland had not experienced terrorist attacks and had faced very little political violence since the end of World War II.

In June 2017, the Finnish Security Intelligence Service assessed the overall terrorist threat as level two ("elevated") on its four-tier scale. According to the Service, the most significant terrorist threat in Finland was at the time "posed by individual actors or small groups motivated by radical Islamist propaganda or terrorist organisations encouraging them." Europol's assessment of terrorism threats in the European Union (EU) in 2016 was similar to that of the Service:

The terrorist threat in the EU in 2016 emanated from remotely directed individuals operating alone or in small groups, and those that may have been inspired by terrorist propaganda, but not directed. The former are receiving direction and personal instruction from, and are possibly being facilitated by, a terrorist organisation. The latter are individual attackers, possibly but not necessarily being helped by family and/or friends as accomplices. They are inspired by jihadist propaganda and messaging, but not necessarily receiving personal direction or instruction from any group.

Between 1 January 2015 and 31 March 2017, Finland received 39,000 asylum applications.

Bouanane arrived in Finland at the beginning of 2016. He had previously lived as an illegal alien in Germany, residing in various cities in North Rhine-Westphalia and using several different identities from the end of 2015 until early 2016 without seeking asylum. He was arrested twice on assault charges in Neuss and Kerpen, and noted by immigration authorities in Hamburg for his unauthorized presence in the country. He had no prior convictions in Finland according to the Finnish Legal Register Centre, but the Finnish Security Intelligence Service confirmed receiving, in early 2017, a non-specific tip-off that Bouanane appeared to be becoming radicalised and was interested in extremist ideology. The tip-off did not contain information suggesting an actual attack. His asylum application had been rejected, which he was in the process of appealing.

According to persons interviewed at the Pansio asylum-seeker reception centre by national broadcaster Yle, Abderrahman Bouanane arrived at the centre in December 2016 and displayed radicalist behaviour during his stay, such as asking how he could join the Islamic State of Iraq and Syria (ISIS), listening to radicalist sermons on his phone and considering Finns to be infidels (kuffār). The interviewees warned the reception centre management of the behaviour in January 2017. Helsingin Sanomat published similar interviews afterward.

Yle also reported that the police were at the time monitoring approximately 100 young asylum seeker men in the Southwest Finland area and that police believed Bouanane had radicalized fairly quickly during August; for example, his behaviour and clothing style had changed. Bouanane was not one of the 350 individuals monitored by the Finnish Security Intelligence Service for terrorism-prevention purposes.

According to concluding remarks by the Finnish National Bureau of Investigation (NBI) after the case was closed, Bouanane told during his interrogations that he started having an interest in ISIS propaganda three months prior to the attack. Police believed he was a lone wolf and there was no evidence of direct contact between any terrorist organization and him. Bouanane possessed ISIS material, such as photos and videos, on his mobile phone and his computer; his close friends believed he displayed signs of radicalization. Bouanane saw himself as a soldier of ISIS and said one motive for his attack were airstrikes by the Western coalition during the 2017 Battle of Raqqa in Syria. According to NBI, his vision was to die in the attack as a martyr similarly to previous attacks in Europe that he admired. He hoped that ISIS would claim his attack—although this did not happen.

== Attack ==
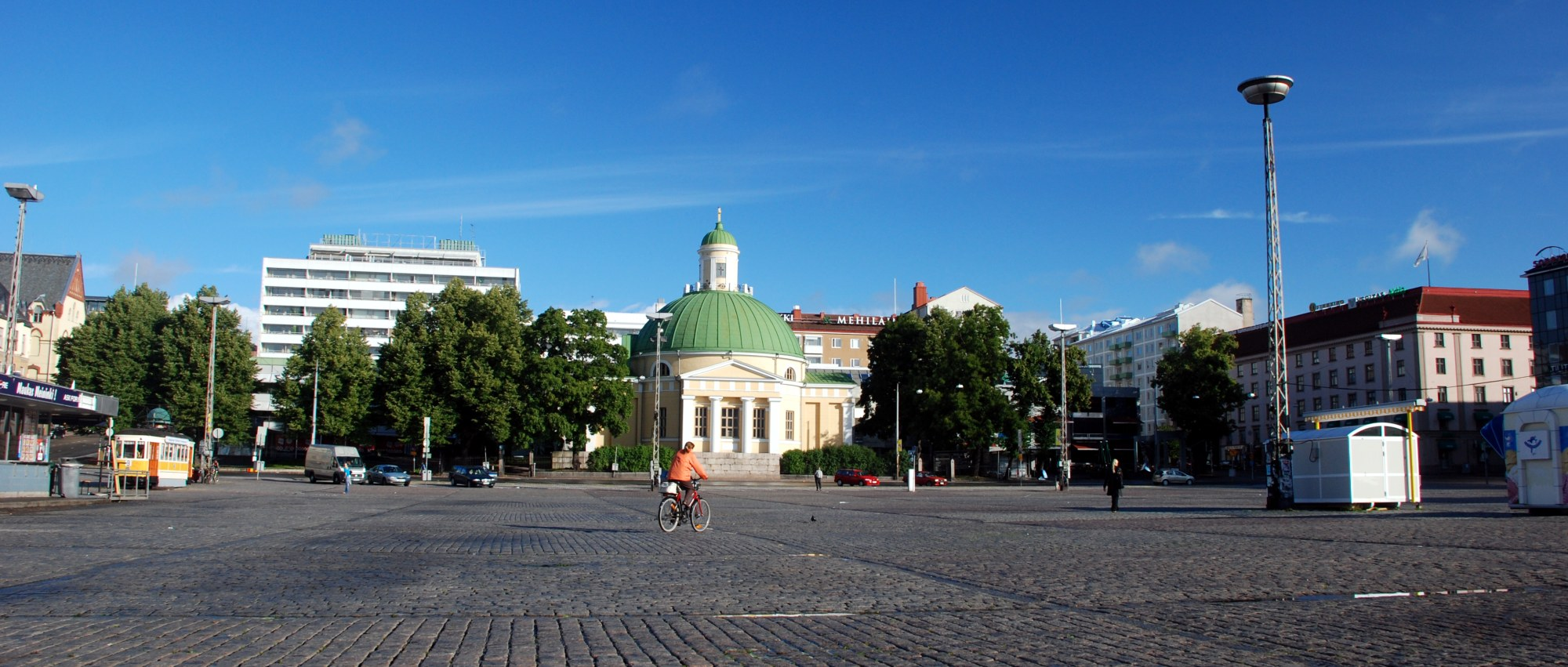
The attack started from the west corner of the Market Square on the left and continued across the square to the right and to the street beyond

Around noon of 18 August 2017, Abderrahman Bouanane took two kitchen knives with him and cycled from a friend's place in Kaarina to downtown Turku, where he attended a Muslim prayer at a mosque next to the river Aura. From there, he proceeded to a park outside Turku Cathedral and read a manifesto he had drafted on video. The manifesto was religiously inspired and contained, among others, discussion on the infidelity of Western nations as well as how oppressed Muslims should act. Bouanane disseminated the video to a group chat on an instant messaging service. Next, he moved to the local bus station where he intended to attack a military conscript, believing a soldier to be a valid target. Bouanane cancelled after other people arrived at the scene and he moved to Turku Market Square.

At around 16:02, Bouanane, armed with the two knives, stabbed four people at the west corner of Market Square. The Emergency Response Centre alerted all nearby police patrols to the incident. Bouanane stabbed six more people while yelling "Allahu akbar" and running towards Puutori, approximately 465 metres (1,526 ft) away. When police confronted Bouanane stabbing a victim at street address Brahenkatu 14 near Puutori, he ignored verbal orders and was immobilised with a single shot to the thigh and a taser at 16:05. He was given first aid and taken into custody.

== Casualties ==
Two people died as a result of the attack: one at the scene of the incident, and another in hospital. Eight victims were non-fatally wounded, six of whom were women and two men; three of them were critically injured. One of the victims was aged 15, the others were adults. Both of the fatalities were Finnish women, born in 1951 and 1986. Among the wounded there were a British man, an Italian woman, a Swedish man, and a 15-year-old Syrian girl who arrived in Finland as an asylum seeker. The Italian citizen did not receive critical injuries while the British citizen, Hassan Zubier, who was a paramedic living in Sweden, was injured four times as he tried to help a victim. Zubier, hailed as a hero by Finnish media, was open about the incident and appeared on national television to discuss it. He stated that after he had rushed to treat a bleeding woman injured during the attack, Bouanane stabbed him several times. Zubier suffered a severed spinal cord and severe nerve damage and lost his mobility. He was critical of some by-standers who took photos and videos of the scene instead of helping and partly blamed the media for this kind of behaviour. He was awarded the George Medal for his bravery.

The police suspected early on that the attacker had purposely chosen females as his victims, as the male victims were injured while trying to help other victims or stop the attacker. It was later discovered that the attacker had previously planned attacks at different sites, which would have included male casualties. Thus, police no longer had reason to believe that the casualties were picked based on their sex.

== Aftermath ==
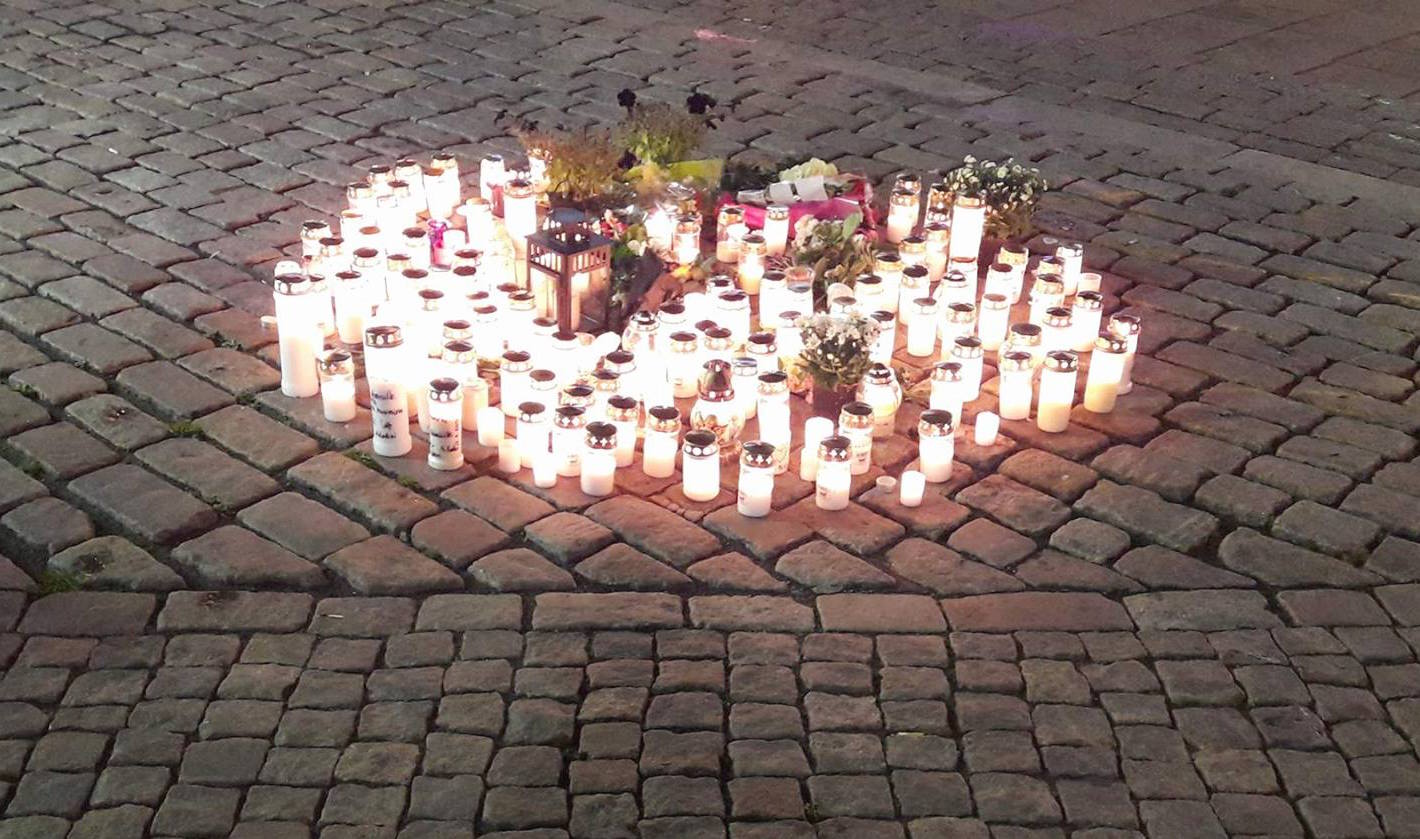
Candles at the Turku Market Square a few hours after the incident

Turku City Library and Hansa shopping centre were evacuated, and police initially advised people to avoid the city centre area. Finnish Prime Minister Juha Sipilä tweeted on 18 August 2017, at 17:09: "The Government is closely following the events in Turku and the on-going police operation. The Government will meet later today." Finnish police increased security across the whole nation, such as at Helsinki Airport and Helsinki Central railway station along with other transport hubs across Finland. A crisis service hotline and an on-site crisis service point were established in the Turku area and the number of on-call social workers was doubled. Flags were flown half-mast on 19 August and a national moment of silence was held at the Market Square on 20 August.

The attack prompted the Finnish Government, Members of Parliament and the President of Finland Sauli Niinistö to discuss fast-tracking the intelligence and surveillance bill in motion to prevent future attacks. The bill proposed to enhance national security against serious threats with both civilian and military intelligence; it included new surveillance powers such as network traffic surveillance and intelligence gathering abroad. Prime Minister Juha Sipilä commented on the need for intelligence gathering reform that "it should be obvious from a constitutional standpoint that the right to life is a more precious fundamental right than the right to privacy in light of the Turku event." Similarly, the event sparked discussion on adjusting asylum and immigration policies, such as returning rejected asylum seekers more rigorously and increasing judicial deterrent on illegal stays. Director of the Finnish Security Intelligence Service Antti Pelttari believed deportation centres for rejected asylum seekers and intensified returns would be beneficial from a security point of view. Interior Minister Paula Risikko did not find the suggestion feasible—as the residents of such centres are not placed under constant surveillance, but are only required to check in regularly.

A photo taken by press photographer Liisa Huima depicting a police officer kneeling beside the lying Abderrahman Bouanane after his detainment at 16:24 was chosen as the news photo of the year in Finland. It was considered to be an illustration of the police officers' response during an exceptional event as well as a reminder of how important freedom of the press is. According to the jury, it is "a classical photograph of an event where the news are currently in motion" and it summarizes the most important news story of the year "straightforwardly and without aesthetics".

In December 2017, a Facebook fundraiser was launched to financially support Hassan Zubier who was injured while assisting another victim of the attack. On 25 June 2018, Zubier became the first foreign person to be awarded Finland's Life Saving Medal for helping a victim and protecting others during the attack. On 19 July 2018, he was also presented the George Medal for his actions.

Zubier applied for Finnish state pension based on injuries he suffered during the attack, but admitted in August 2018 to benefits fraud by forging work history in his application. Prior, the Finnish State Treasury (Finnish: Valtiokonttori) discovered that he had not worked at the designated ambulance company during the dates specified in his application. Furthermore, the signee on the documentation provided by Zubier was not an employee of the company.

== Investigation ==
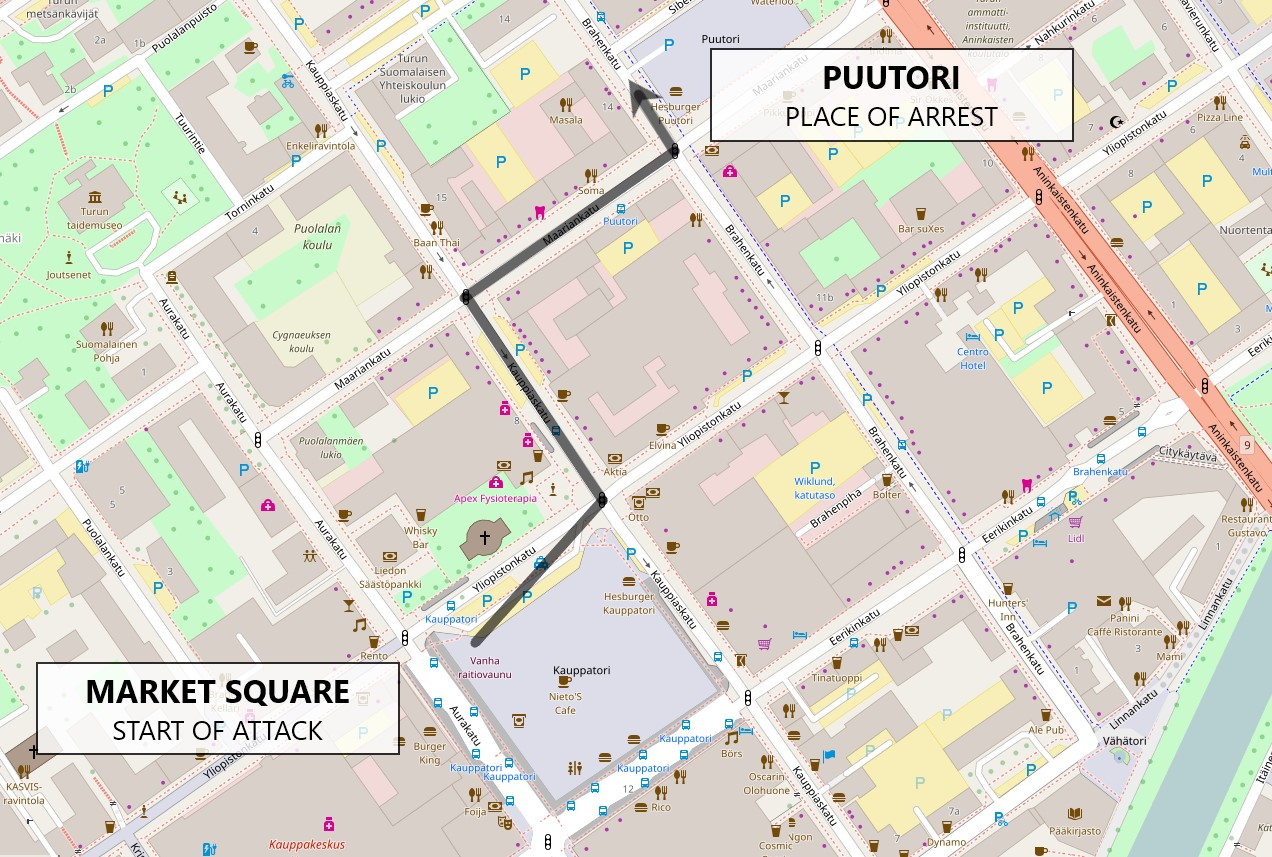
Map of the attack route

=== 18–20 August ===
At 19:00 on 18 August 2017, the police held a press conference where they reported that the nature of the attack had not yet been established. On 19 August at 14:00, the Finnish National Bureau of Investigation (NBI) announced that the arrested main suspect was an 18-year-old Moroccan man, and that the case was suspected to be a terrorist attack. NBI reported that police had raided a flat in the Varissuo suburb of Turku, home to a large immigrant population, and an asylum-seekers' reception centre in the Pansio suburb of Turku overnight between 18 and 19 August. Four additional Moroccan nationals were arrested while one person was placed under an international arrest warrant. A white Fiat Ducato belonging to one of the suspects was seized during the raids.

The Finnish Security Intelligence Service deemed that the terrorist threat assessment level would remain unchanged from level two ("elevated"). According to the Service's assessment at the time, Bouanane's profile was similar to that of several other recent radical Islamist terrorist attacks that have taken place in Europe and the Service considered the incident to be the first suspected terrorist strike in Finland. On the morning of 20 August, NBI conducted an approximately 45-minute re-enactment of the event at Market Square and Puutori as a normal method of investigating serious crimes. Additional locations were searched in the Runosmäki suburb of Turku and persons connected to the case were interviewed. NBI gathered photographic and video evidence from the public through a WhatsApp account.

=== 21–25 August ===
On 21 August, Bouanane was named by authorities as Abderrahman Mechkah—although the name was subsequently shown to be false. He remained in hospital on 21 August, but no longer in intensive care. NBI requested he be remanded during pre-trial investigations. Bouanane and three of the suspected associates were remanded into pre-trial detention on 22 August by the district court of Southwest Finland (Finnish: Varsinais-Suomen käräjäoikeus) on suspicion of two counts of murder with terrorist intent and eight counts of attempted murder with terrorist intent. He admitted to causing the deaths and injuries, but denied that they constituted murder with terrorist intent. The motive of the attack was still unclear according to NBI. Investigators cancelled the remand hearing of one of the five originally arrested and cleared the person from any charges. NBI was at the time investigating the case in cooperation with Europol and Interpol and focusing on background issues, such as whether the attack was conducted in isolation or whether an organization guided the suspects as well as trying to locate the sixth suspect outside of Finland. On 23 August, two more suspects were detained on suspicion of preparing to commit crimes with terrorist intent. The two were subsequently interviewed; and one of them released and cleared of charges later on. As of 24 August, four suspects were in pre-trial detention, one arrested, one under an international arrest warrant and two cleared.

=== 26 August – 7 February ===
On 26 August, NBI reported that they had released the second suspect arrested on 23 August and cleared the person of all charges. On 27 August, it was reported that Abderrahman Mechkah was not the main suspect's real name, nor was he 18 years old as previously thought. He was later confirmed to be Abderrahman Bouanane (born 25 October 1994). Two of the remanded suspects were released and cleared of all charges on 31 August. Reports also described the suspect placed under an international arrest warrant as a 23-year-old Finnish citizen born in Uzbekistan suspected of supporting Bouanane's radical thoughts. (As of September 2018, the wanted suspect had contacted NBI with the intent to clear the matter, but he had not been questioned nor was his exact location known.) NBI commented that the investigation will continue for months in part due to the need to translate Arabic material.

The fourth remanded accessory suspect was released from detention and cleared of charges on 1 September, leaving Bouanane as the only one remaining in custody. Bouanane was ordered on 12 October by the district court to undergo a psychiatric evaluation—a request he had made early into the investigation; the results determined that Bouanane was fully aware of his actions. On 19 October, the Finnish Government established an independent inquiry team to investigate the stabbing and provide recommendations on how new attacks could be prevented. NBI held a press conference on 7 February 2018 to report that the investigation was concluded and the material, spanning some 1,400 pages, would be forwarded to the Finnish Prosecution Office. During the same press conference, the Finnish Security Intelligence Service reiterated that there was no apparent need to change the terrorist threat level from level two ("elevated").

== Trial ==
Bouanane was charged by the prosecution with two counts of murder with terrorist intent and eight counts of attempted murder with terrorist intent on 27 February 2018. According to the relevant authorities, the defendant had been acting compos mentis and was therefore competent to stand trial. The case came before the district court of Southwest Finland, the court of first instance under whose jurisdiction Turku comes. The preliminary hearing began on 20 March. The actual trial started on 9 April, and was expected to last until mid-May.

On 15 June, Bouanane was found guilty of murder with terrorist intent on two counts, and of attempted murder with terrorist intent on eight counts. He was sentenced to life in prison. The verdict was described as the first time anybody had been sentenced for a terrorist crime in Finland. Reuters wrote after the ruling that the stabbing represented the "first militant Islamist attack" in Finland and Finnish Jihadism researcher Atte Kaleva iterated that "the ruling confirms radical Islamist terrorism's entry into Finland." Bouanane appealed the court's decision on the last possible day for appeals. However, in January 2019, Bouanane withdrew his appeal.

== Reactions ==
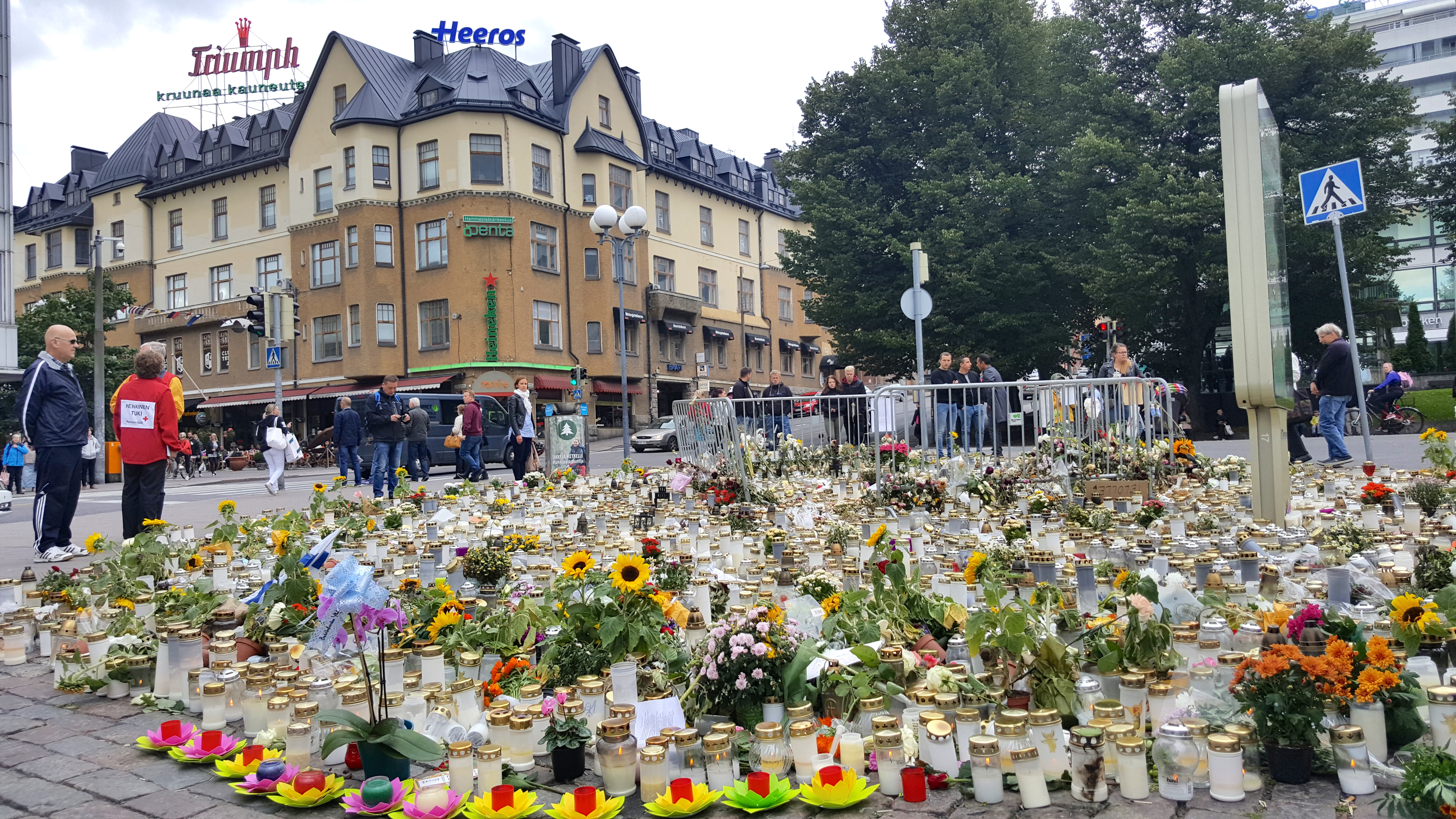
Candles and flowers near the attack start point on 26 August 2017

Prime Minister Juha Sipilä remarked during a press conference on 19 August 2017: "If the criminal charge is confirmed to be terror-related murder, that would be a first in Finland. We have feared this. The day before in Barcelona and now in Turku. We are no longer an island." He added: "This act was cowardly and reprehensible. The killing of innocent people is a violation of humanity and of religions' principles. We are however all in the same boat and we must defend humanity so that hate is not answered with hate." Interior Minister Paula Risikko said on Twitter on 19 August: "Terrorists want to pit people against each other. We will not let this happen. Finnish society will not be defeated by fear or hatred." On 19 August, protesters from anti-immigration and anti-racism groups staged demonstrations near the site of the stabbing. The Islamic Council of Finland and the Moroccan Forum in Finland strongly condemned the attack and denounced the use of violence and hatred on 20 August. Several international leaders offered their condolences to the victims of the attacks.

== See also ==
- 2017 Barcelona attacks
- 2017 Stockholm truck attack
- 2017 Medborgarplatsen stabbing
- List of terrorist incidents in August 2017
- Stabbing as a terrorist tactic
