= Pétur Sakari =

Finnish organist

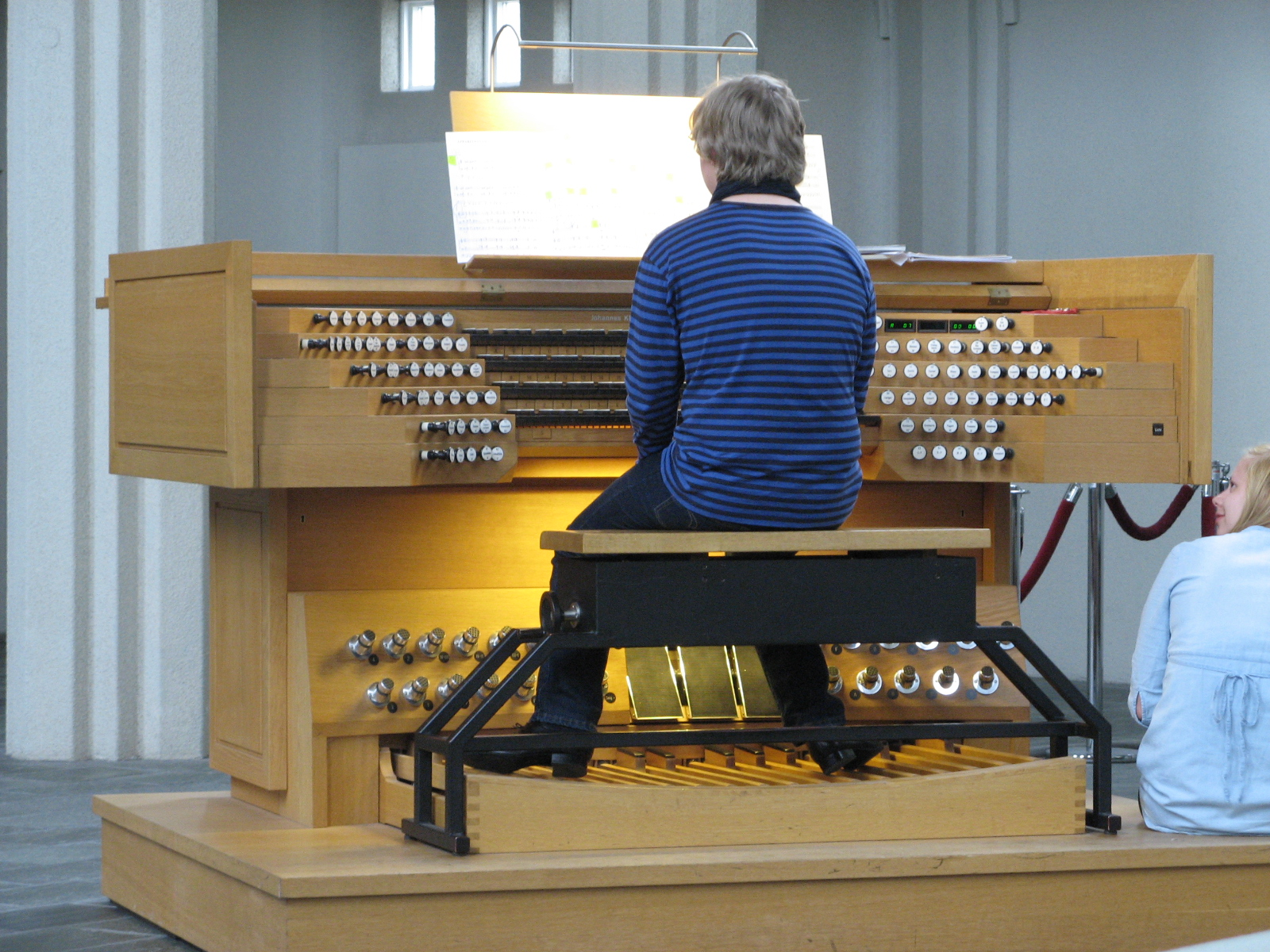
Pétur Sakari at the organ

Pétur Sakari (born 1992) is an international concert organist from Finland.

== Early life and education ==
Sakari studied folk music at the Sibelius Academy in Helsinki. He studied organ playing in Paris with the organists Vincent Warnier (repertoire) and Thierry Escaich (improvisation). Sakari performed his first concert at age 13. At 17 years old, he was named Young Artist of the Year at the Lahti International Organ Week.

== Career ==
Sakari began performing internationally in his teens. His first CD, Première, was published in 2010, when he was 18 years old. He recorded an album with the Turku Philharmonic Orchestra (2011), conducted by his father Petri Sakari.

Sakari signed a record deal with the international label BIS (Sweden). His first album for BIS, French Organ Music, was recorded in Saint-Étienne-du-Mont, Paris, was released in 2014, and includes French romantic music by composers such as Vierne, Franck and Duruflé. The CD was well received by critics in the media; it earned five stars by the French music magazine Diapason. and full points in a review by the German music magazine Klassik Heute. With this cd Pétur Sakari was the first Nordic organist to record in Paris.

Pétur Sakari has been selected as Young organist of the Year at several organ festivals in Finland. He performs in Finland and in a number of countries abroad, including Iceland, France and the United States. He has played solo concerts as well as with several orchestras, and has accompanied soloists, bands, dancers, silent films and choirs.
