= Swanwhite =

Swanwhite may refer to:

- Svanevit, a play by August Strindberg (1901)
- Swanwhite (Sibelius), incidental music written by Jean Sibelius for Strindberg's play (1908)
- a character in The Chronicles of Narnia by C. S. Lewis (1950–56)
