= Mikko Heiniö =

Finnish composer and musicologist

Mikko Kyösti Heiniö (born 18 May 1948) is a Finnish composer and musicologist.

== Life ==
Mikko Heiniö was born in 1948 in Tampere, and studied composition with Joonas Kokkonen and piano with Liisa Pohjola at the Sibelius Academy in Helsinki from 1971 to 1975, and then studied composition with Witold Szalonek in West Berlin from 1975 to 1977 while at the same time beginning studies in musicology at the University of Helsinki. He earned a diploma in composition from the Sibelius Academy in 1977, and a doctorate in musicology in 1984 from the University of Helsinki, where he lectured between 1977 and 1985 (Murtomäki 2001). He was appointed professor of musicology at the University of Turku in 1986–2005 and he is composer-in-residence of the Turku Philharmonic Orchestra since 1997. Heiniö has been a member of the Board of Teosto (the Finnish Composers’ Copyright Bureau) and he has served as Chairman of the Society of Finnish Composers in 1992–2010.

Heiniö's compositions include nine piano concertos, three symphonies and numerous chamber works for various instrument combinations. He has written four operas: the church opera Riddaren och draken (The Knight and the Dragon, 2000), Käärmeen hetki (The Hour of the Serpent), premièred in September 2006, and Eerik XIV (Erik XIV), premièred in November 2011, and Johanna (2018). His work list also includes solo works as well as vocal and choral music.

Heiniö is also a noted writer on music, specialising in the subject of new Finnish music. He has written twelve books and over two hundred articles. His music has been recorded on the BIS, Finlandia and Sony labels, among others.

== Work list ==
Operas

- Riddaren och draken (2000)
- Käärmeen hetki (2006)
- Eerik XIV (2008–2010)
- Johanna (2016–2018)

Orchestral Works

- Framtidens skugga (The Shadow of the Future) (1980) for soprano and 4tpt/4tbn/tba
- Concerto for piano and orchestra no 3, op 39 (1981)
- Vuelo de alambre, op 43 (1983) for soprano and orchestra
- Genom kvällen (Through the evening), op 48 (1986), Concerto for piano and orchestra no 4, for solo piano, mixed choir and string orchestra
- Possible Worlds – a Symphony, op 49 (1987/99)
- Concerto for Piano and Orchestra no 5, op 53 (1989)
- Wind Pictures (Tuulenkuvia), op 56 (1991) for mixed choir and orchestra
- Dall'ombra all'ombra, op 58 (1992), seven variations, theme and coda for orchestra and synthesizer
- Hermes (Piano concerto no 6) for piano, soprano and string orchestra, op 61 (1994) (Dance Pictures)
- Trias, op 62 (1995) de "O quam mundum" (Piae Cantiones 1582: lxxi)
- Minne, op 64 (1996) for string orchestra
- Symphony no 2 "Yön ja rakkauden lauluja" ("Songs of Night and Love"), op 66 (1997)
- On the Rocks, op 68 (1998)
- Khora (Piano concerto no 7) (2001) (Dance images for piano and five percussionists)
- Envelope (2002) for Haydn's trumpet concerto in eb (for solo trumpet and orchestra)
- Sonata da chiesa (2005) for 4hn, 3trp, 3trb, tba, cel, timp, 3perc
- Alla madre (2007), for solo violin and orchestra
- Moon Concerto (Kuukonsertto, 2008) (Piano concerto no 8) for piano, mezzo-soprano and orchestra
- Maestoso, Variations of a Fragment by Eric XIV (2008) for orchestra
- Syyskesän laulu (Late Summer Song) (2008) for voice and orchestra
- Nonno (Piano concerto no 9) (2011) for amplified piano and big band
- Concerto for Organ and Orchestra (2013)
- Syvyyden yllä tuuli (Wind above the Depths) (2019) for barytone, mixed choir and orchestra

Chamber Music

- Duo per violino e pianoforte (1979)
- Brass mass (1979) for 4tpt/4tbn/tba(ad lib)
- Piano trio (1988)
- In g for cello and piano (1988)
- Piano quintet (1993)
- Relay for violin and cello (1998)
- Sextet (2000) for baritone and ensemble: fl, cl, vl, vc, pf
- Treno della notte, for clarinet, cello and piano (2000)
- Café au lait, for flute, clarinet, violin, cello and piano (2006)
- Canzona per trio d'archi (2006)
- Piano Quartet (The voice of the tree/Puun ääni) (2006)
- Duo per violino e pianoforte (1979)
- Brass mass (1979) for 4tpt/4tbn/tba(ad lib)
- Piano trio (1988)
- In G for cello and piano (1988)
- Piano quintet (1993)
- Relay for violin and cello (1998)
- Sextet (2000) for baritone and ensemble: fl, cl, vl, vc, pf
- Treno della notte, for clarinet, cello and piano (2000)
- Café au lait, for flute, clarinet, violin, cello and piano (2006)
- Canzona per trio d'archi (2006)
- Piano Quartet (The voice of the tree/Puun ääni) (2006)
- Mot natten (Towards Night) (2018) for cello and guitar

Choral Works

- Kolme kansanlaulua (Drei Finnische Volkslieder), for double mixed choir (1977)
- Landet som icke är, for children's or women's choir and piano (1980)
- Luceat, for mixed choir (1992)
- Non-Stop, for mixed choir (1995)
- Juhlamarssi hiljaisille miehille, for male choir (1996)
- Pikavuaro Turkku, for mixed choir (2002)
- Tomumieli, for male choir and two djembe drums (2003)
- The Bishop's Spring Dream, for five male voices (5 or 15 singers) (2005)
- Maria Suite, for mixed choir (2011)
- Evening, for mixed choir (2015)
- Amen, for male choir and tubular bell (2016)

Works for other instruments

- Five Preludes for Guitar (2015)
- Through Green Glass (2014)
