= Kun ystävyyssuhteet solmitaan =

Sculpture by Wäinö Aaltonen (1948)

Coordinates: 60°27′19.0″N 22°16′11.5″E

Kun ystävyyssuhteet solmitaan (in Finnish) När vänskapsbanden knytes (in Swedish)
- Artist: Wäinö Aaltonen
- Year: 1948
- Type: Bronze
- Location: Gothenburg/Turku

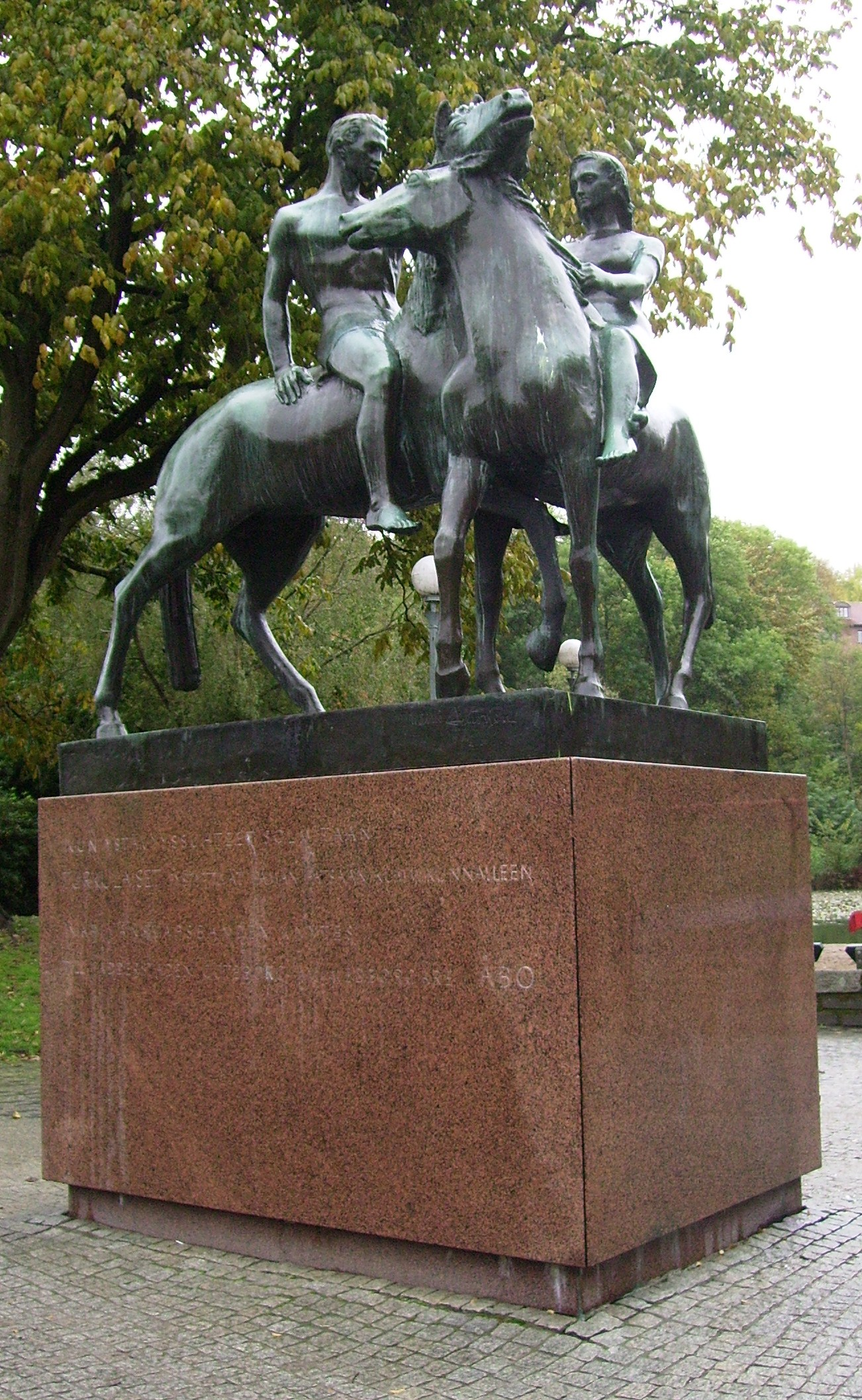
När vänskapsbanden knytes in Gothenburg

Kun ystävyyssuhteet solmitaan (Finnish) or När vänskapsbanden knytes (Swedish, "When Friendships are Made") is a sculpture erected by Wäinö Aaltonen, located in the Puutori market square in Turku, Finland. It symbolises the twin town partnership of Turku and Gothenburg. There are two sculptures, the original in Gothenburg and its duplicate at Aninkaistenkatu 12 in Turku.

The City of Turku commissioned Aaltonen to make the sculpture for Gothenburg as a thank you for aiding Turku during wartime. The statues were ready in 1948 and their unveiling was in 1955, first in Gothenburg on 8 may and then in Turku on 21 May. Commercial counsellor Leo Wainstein donated the duplicate, that is located in Turku, to the city.

Kun ystävyyssuhteet solmitaan itself is made of bronze and stands 2.95m high. The base of the sculpture is made of red granite and stands 1.7 meters, or 5.6 feet, high. The sculpture depicts a man and a woman, both on horseback, meeting each other, symbolising the friendship between the two cities.
