= Puutorin Vessa =

Pub in Turku, Finland

Coordinates: 60°27′19″N 22°16′9″E

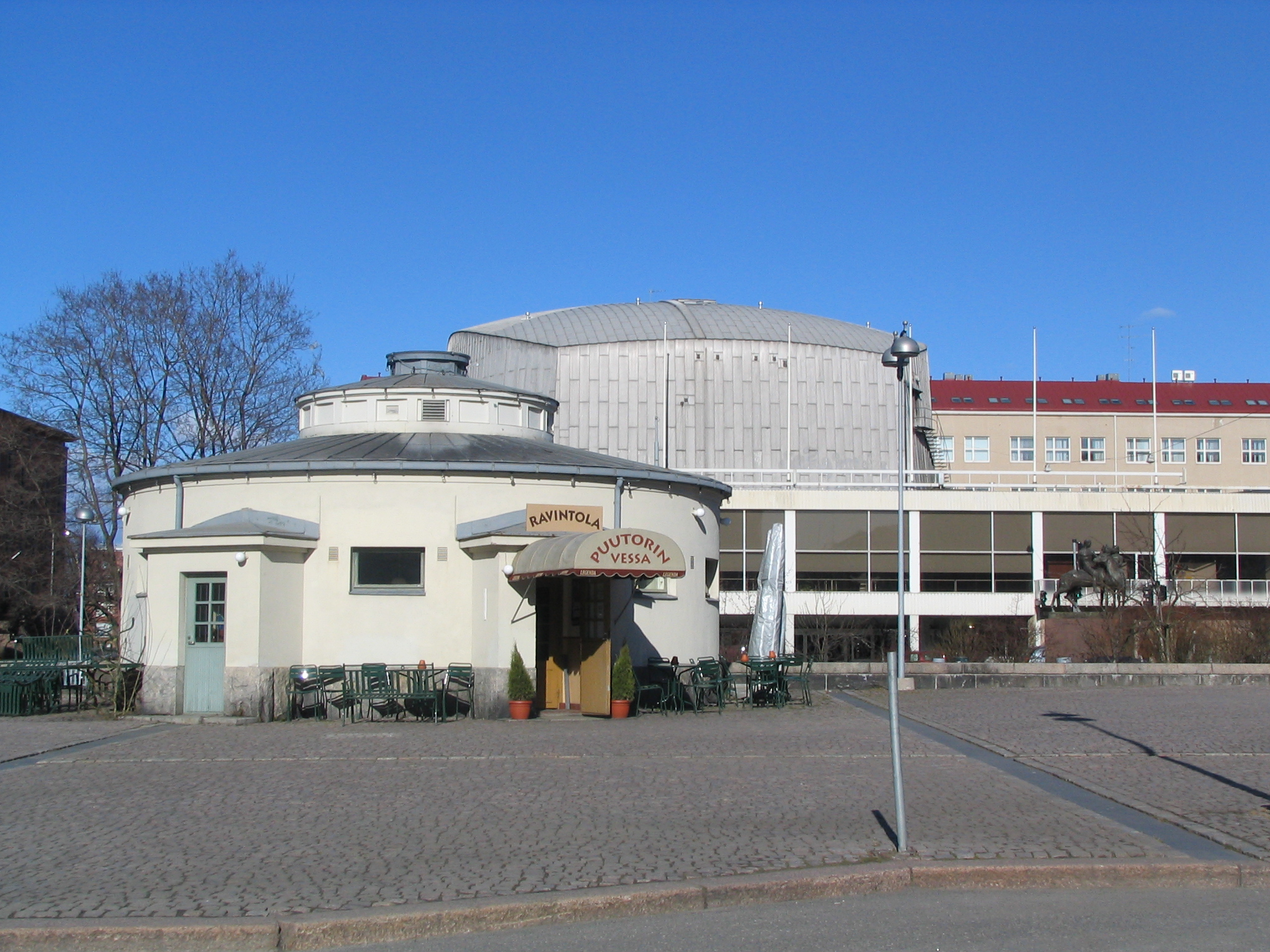
The WaterLoo Pub

Puutorin Vessa (lit. 'The timber market square's toilet' is a pub in the City of Turku, Finland. The circular building sits on the Puutori square, and it once served as a public restroom.

== History ==
The building was completed in 1933 and it was designed by Totti Sora to serve as the weigh house for the bus station operating at the square. The building was open as a public restroom until 1986.

Markku Heikkilä and Kaija Väisänen renovated the building and it became a restaurant under the name "Puutorin Vessa". The restaurant opened on 6 June 1997. It was operated by Heikkilä until 2007; it was then operated by Lasse Laaksonen. The restaurant declared bankruptcy in 2014, when it was taken over by Tim Glogan, who opened it as the pun, WaterLoo Pub.

At the end of 2018, Tim Glogan sold the business to Kenneth Forsström, owner of the Merihelmi Pub Boat on the River Aura. He reopened it in February 2019 under its original name, Puutorin Vessa.
