= Fennica Gehrman =

Finnish music publishing company

Fennica Gehrman Oy Ab is a Finnish music publishing company founded in 2002 and a subsidiary of Gehrmans Musikförlag Ab of Stockholm. It is the publisher of classical catalogues earlier owned by Edition Fazer and Warner/Chappell Music Finland as well as the classical works published by Edition Love. Fennica Gehrman publishes contemporary names such as Einojuhani Rautavaara, Kalevi Aho, Kimmo Hakola, Mikko Heiniö, Olli Kortekangas, Lotta Wennäkoski, Matthew Whittall and Veli-Matti Puumala. Fennica Gehrman’s catalogue includes also works by Jean Sibelius, Leevi Madetoja, Uuno Klami, Armas Järnefelt among other Finnish composers.

== History ==
Fennica Gehrman’s roots stretch back for a hundred years of publishing Finnish music. Fazer Music was founded by the Swiss businessman K. G. Fazer in November 1897 when he purchased Anna Melan’s music shop in Helsinki together with R. E. Westerlund. The following year they turned to publishing.
