= Mikael Lybeck =

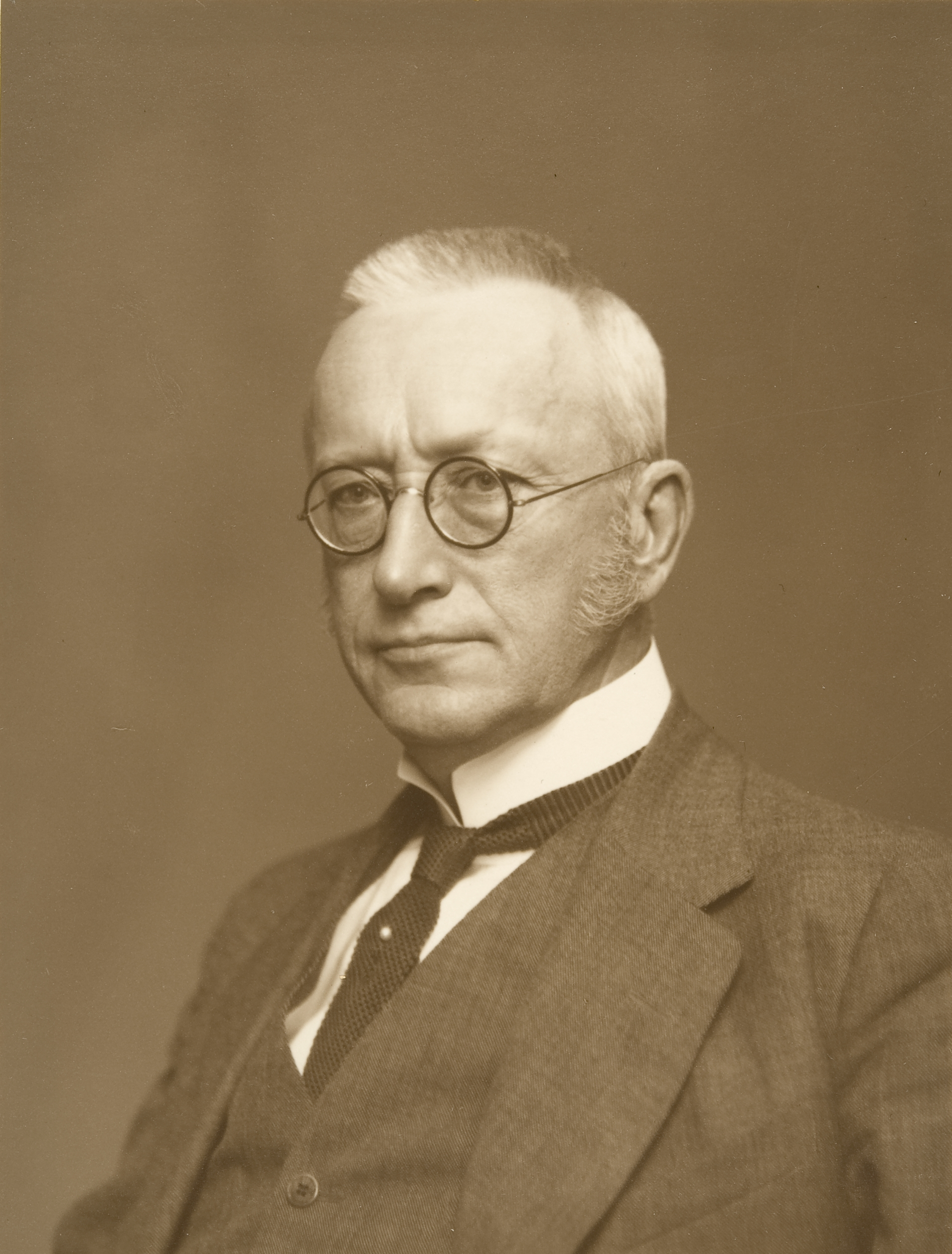
- Born: 18 March 1864; Nykarleby
- Died: 11 October 1925 (aged 61); Kauniainen
- Occupation: Poet

Karl Mikael Lybeck (18 March 1864 – 11 October 1925) was a Finland-Swede poet, novelist, and playwright.

== Background and studies ==
Lybeck's parents were city councillor Johan Adolf Lybeck and Isabella Augusta Lindqvist. In 1875 Lybeck left his home for Helsinki, where he went to the Swedish-speaking Helsingfors lyceum together with his brother Paul Werner. Lybeck matriculated in 1882 and then studied literature at the University of Helsinki, earning his BA in 1887. After graduation, Lybeck continued his studies of literature in Germany between 1888 and 1889.

== Career ==
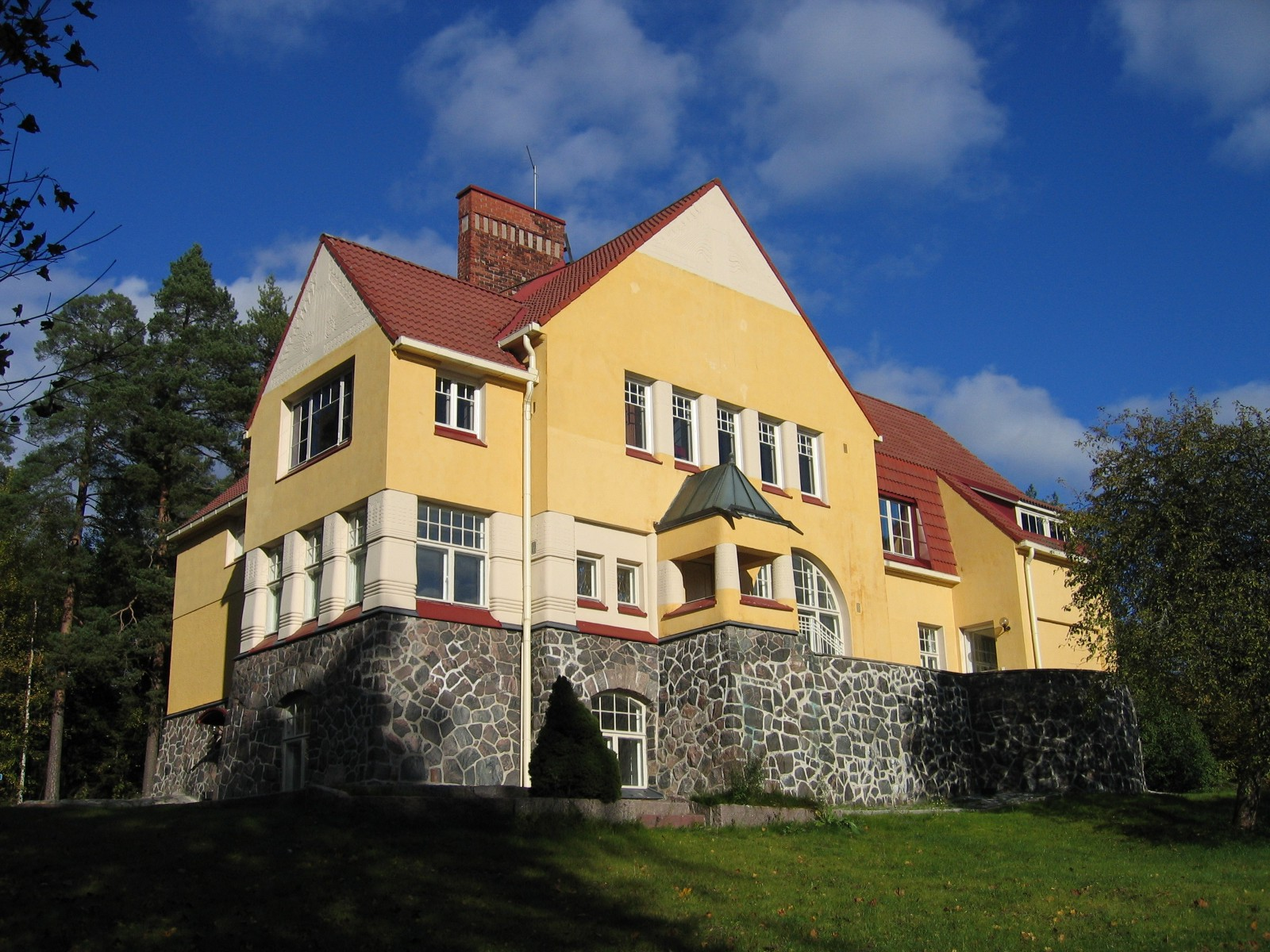
Villa Vallmogård in Kauniainen

After having returned from Germany, Lybeck first lived in Nykarleby and while there he published his debut book, a poem collection called Dikter. He moved back to Helsinki in 1893 and worked as an amanuensis at the Helsinki University Library (now National Library) in 1893–1896. Lybeck married Louise Sanmark in 1898. In 1900, he published the novel Den starkare, which became his breakthrough work. The novel criticizes religious hypocrisy through a story of struggle between charismatic preacher Kurt Hedelius and freethinker and skeptic Robert Viding that Viding prevails in even though he ends up losing both his fiancé and mother to the preacher.

Lybeck's most prominent works were the 1911 novel Tomas Indal and the 1920 epistolary novel Breven till Cecilia. The former's main character is a middle-aged medicine student returning to his hometown, while the latter's Sven Ingelet is an aesthetician and connoisseur of Renaissance art who commits suicide after having broken his heart because of his unfaithful lover Cecilia. Lybeck can be said to have stood, especially in his poetry (the poems Klockbojen and Trötta träd), for the pessimistic movement of the turn of the century.

Lybeck also wrote six plays. Of those, Dynastin Peterberg written in 1913 was the most popular, while his other plays were left largely unnoticed. Dynastin Peterberg takes place during the first period of Russification of Finland (1899–1905) and depicts Peterberg's family business, whose existence is threatened by Monsieur André, a chamber servant of the Russian Imperial Court. The same Monsieur André played the part of the hero in Lybeck's play Den röde André, taking place during the Russian February Revolution of 1917 where his opposition is the Rasputin-like Akim the Wondermaker.

Lybeck had Villa Vallmogård built for his family in Kauniainen between 1906 and 1907. He lived and worked there for the rest of his life. The villa was bought by the city in 1956 and was the market town, and later city, hall for more than twenty years. After 1982 it has housed a music school and a cultural center.

== Works ==
- Dikter. 1890
- Unge Hemming: Karaktärsstudie. 1891
- Ett mosaikarbete. 1892
- ”Allas vår Margit”: Småstadsskildring. 1893
- Dikter: Andra samlingen. 1895
- Dagar och nätter. 1896
- Den starkare. 1900 (Later published as Den starkaste.)
- Dikter III. 1903
- Ödlan: Ett skådespel. 1908
- Lyrik: En och trettio dikter i urval 1890–1910. 1910
- Tomas Indal: En början och ett slut. 1911
- Dynastin Peterberg: En stilla komedi. 1913
- Bror och syster: Drama. 1915
- Hennerson: Historien om en gårdskarl. 1916
- Den röde André: En upplyftande skådespel. 1917
- Dödsfången: En diktcykel. 1918
- Breven till Cecilia. 1920
- Samlade arbeten I–XI. 1921–1923
- Scopenhauer: Scener ur hans ungdom. 1922
- Domprosten Bomander: Samtal. Skådespel. 1923
- Samtal med Lackau under hans levnads sista halvår: Efterlämnade anteckningar av Klas Uggelberg. 1925
