= Aura River =

Aura River may refer to one of the following rivers:

- Aura (Sinn), a river in Bavaria, Germany
- Aura River (Finland), a river in southwestern Finland
- Aura (Norway), a river in Nesset Municipality, Norway
- Aurá River, a river in Maranhão state, Brazil
