= Puutori =

Market square in Turku, Finland

Coordinates: 60°27′17″N 022°16′06″E

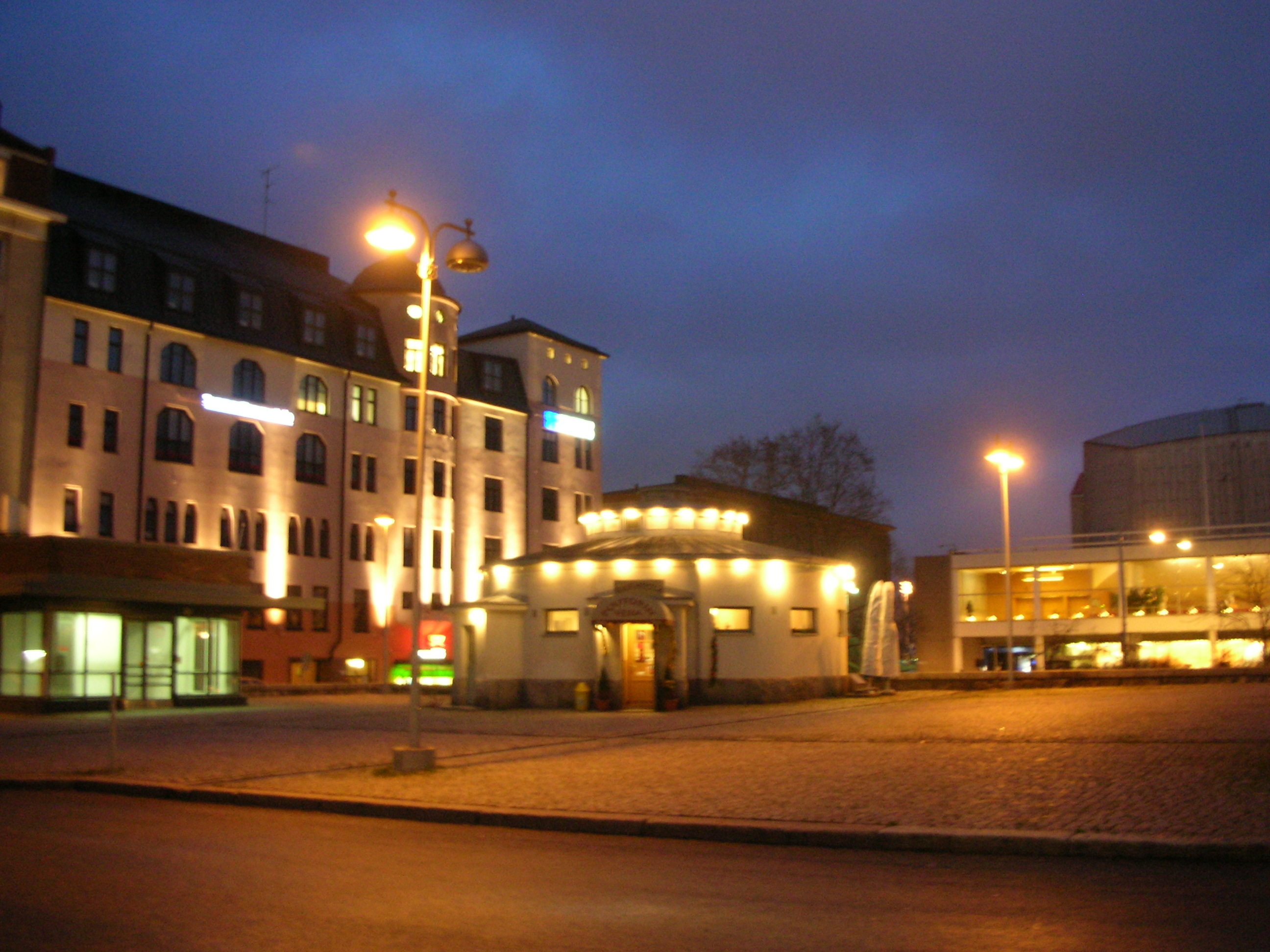
Puutori

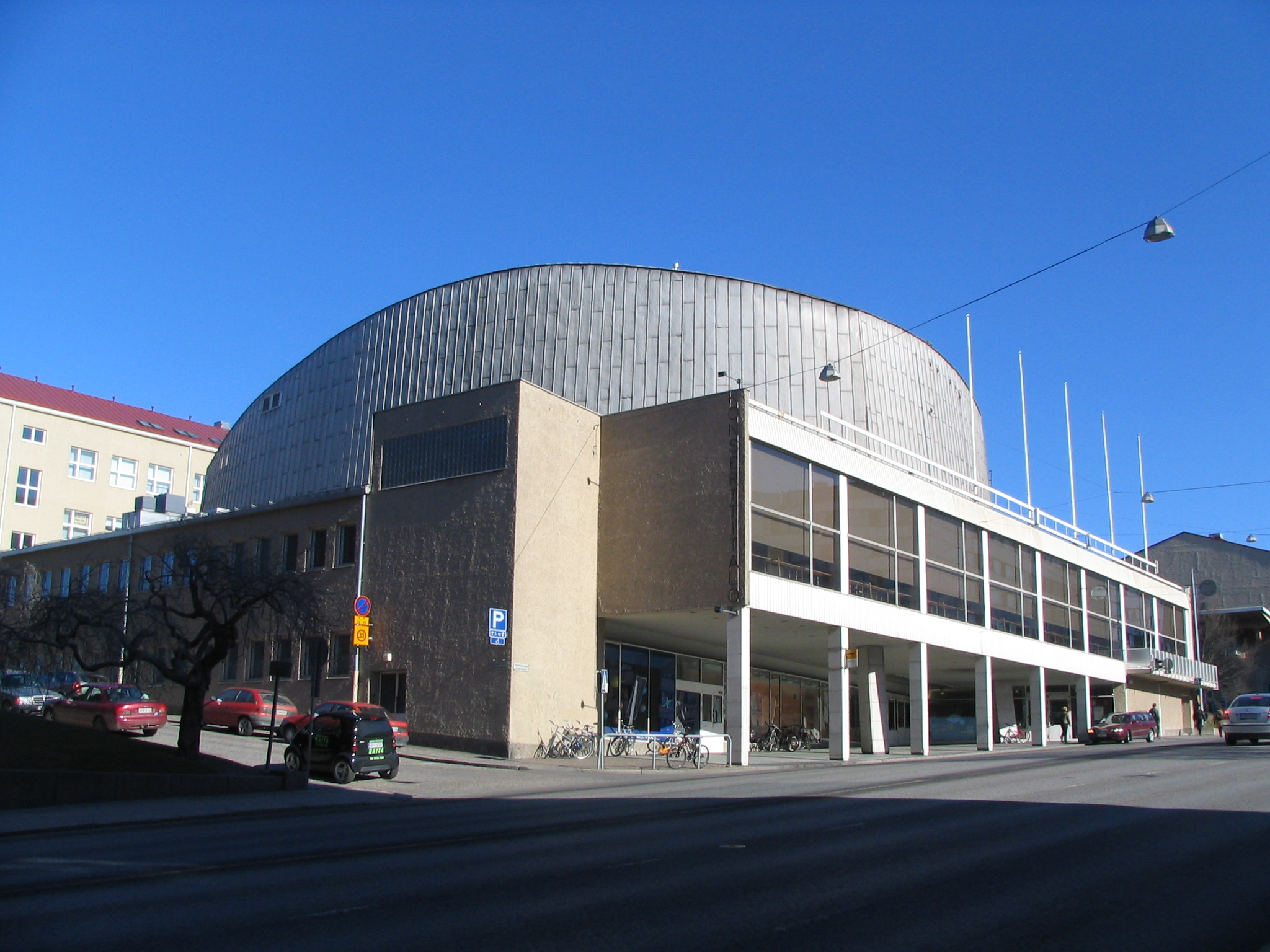
Turku Concert Hall

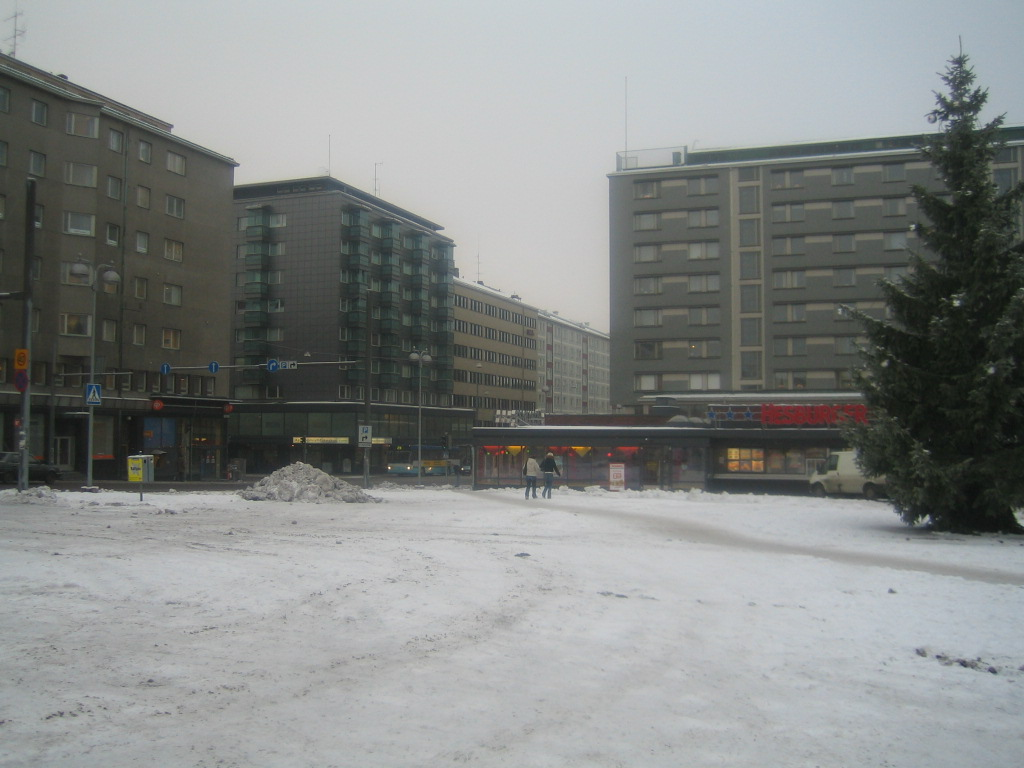
View of Maariankatu and Brahenkatu

Puutori (Swedish: Trätorget, lit. 'timber market square') is a market square in the city centre of Turku, Finland. It measures at approximately 100 by 40 metres (330 ft × 130 ft). It is bordered by Aninkaistenkatu/Aningaisgatan, Maariankatu/Mariegatan, Brahenkatu/Brahegatan and Sibeliuksenkatu/Sibeliusgatan. Today, it has no regular market square activity but Puutorin puolesta ry organises different events there each year. Located at one end of the square are Ystävyydenpuisto ("friendship park") and Wäinö Aaltonen's statue Kun ystävyyssuhteet solmitaan, which was designed in 1955 in honour of the friendship between Turku and Gothenburg. There are also small cafés and shops surrounding Puutori, as well as a pet store.

== History ==
Turku Puutori was marked as a wasteland on the city maps at the end of the 18th century to the beginning of the 19th century. The Puutori area was left out of the city plans made by C.L. Engel because it was located too close to the newly built Market Square, at the time called Aleksanterintori or "Alexander's Market Square". The area was known as Onnettomuudenmäki ("Accident Hill") because the Great Fire of Turku started at Aninkaistenmäki.

Merchants came to the settlement that had surrounded the square in the 19th century. Old clothing retailers, who had been driven out of the deserted plot that was then bordered by Aurakatu, Venäjänkirkkokatu and Puolalankatu, came to Puutori. In the late 19th century, timber from the countryside was brought to the square to be sold. This is why Aninkaistentori was started to be called Puutori.

In 1902, an old cargo office and terminal (vaakahuone) was built at Puutori. The building was replaced by a new cargo office and terminal in 1933 which became the first public convenience until 1986. Later, in 1997, a new restaurant opened up in the building. The first bus station in Turku was built at Puutori in the 20th century. However, long-distance buses went to the new bus station, just one block away, after it was completed. Local buses was still using Puutori as a base on the 1990s. Local busses now currently operate from Turku Market Square.

Puutori commerce activity has varied over the decades. The Puutori open area was called Finland's largest flea market in the 1960s but due to overcrowding and an underground car park built in the early 1990s, the square gradually became depopulated.

== Present day and future ==
After Puutori became inactive and desolate, the organisation 'Puutorin puolesta was established to revive the square. Nowadays, events for Turun Taiteiden yö (Turku Night of the Arts) as well as Booktori are organised there as well as a flea market event called Vapaatori. In addition to this, a flea market is set up on Saturdays during summertime, bringing in crowds of people.

Many residents of Turku support a possible renewal of Puutori. There is hope that the asphalt lanes that divide the square will be evened out by cobblestones, heavy traffic would slow down and that a regular flea market would reopen at the square. However, in the city's development plans, Turku Market Square is the number one priority.

There has been suggestion that the junction of local buses would be moved from Turku Market Square to Puutori; there are currently local and short-haul bus stops at the corner of the square that operate from Turku Market Square to the north.

== Neighboring buildings ==
- Turku Concert Hall
- Puutorin Vessa
- Turku Bus Station
- Turku Synagogue
- Turun ammatti-instituutti
- Turun Suomalainen Yhteiskoulu
- Maakunta-arkisto
- Brahe Center mall

== Sources ==
- Turun Sanomat, 14.7.2001, Perinteinen kirpputoripaikka
- Turun Sanomat, 15.11.2004, Turun torien historiaa näyttelyssä – Kauppatorikin on joskus ollut uusi
