= Music Hall Fuuga =

Music Hall Fuuga is a concert venue in Turku, Finland.

The hall was designed by architect Tuomas Silvennoinen, decision to build it was made in 2020 and the building was completed in 2026. Main auditorium can host audience of 1300, smaller one up to 300 people. Fuuga cost 90 million euros. It will replace Turku Concert Hall as the main venue of Turku Philharmonic Orchestra.
