= Swanwhite (Sibelius) =

Incidental music by Jean Sibelius

- Incidental music by Jean Sibelius
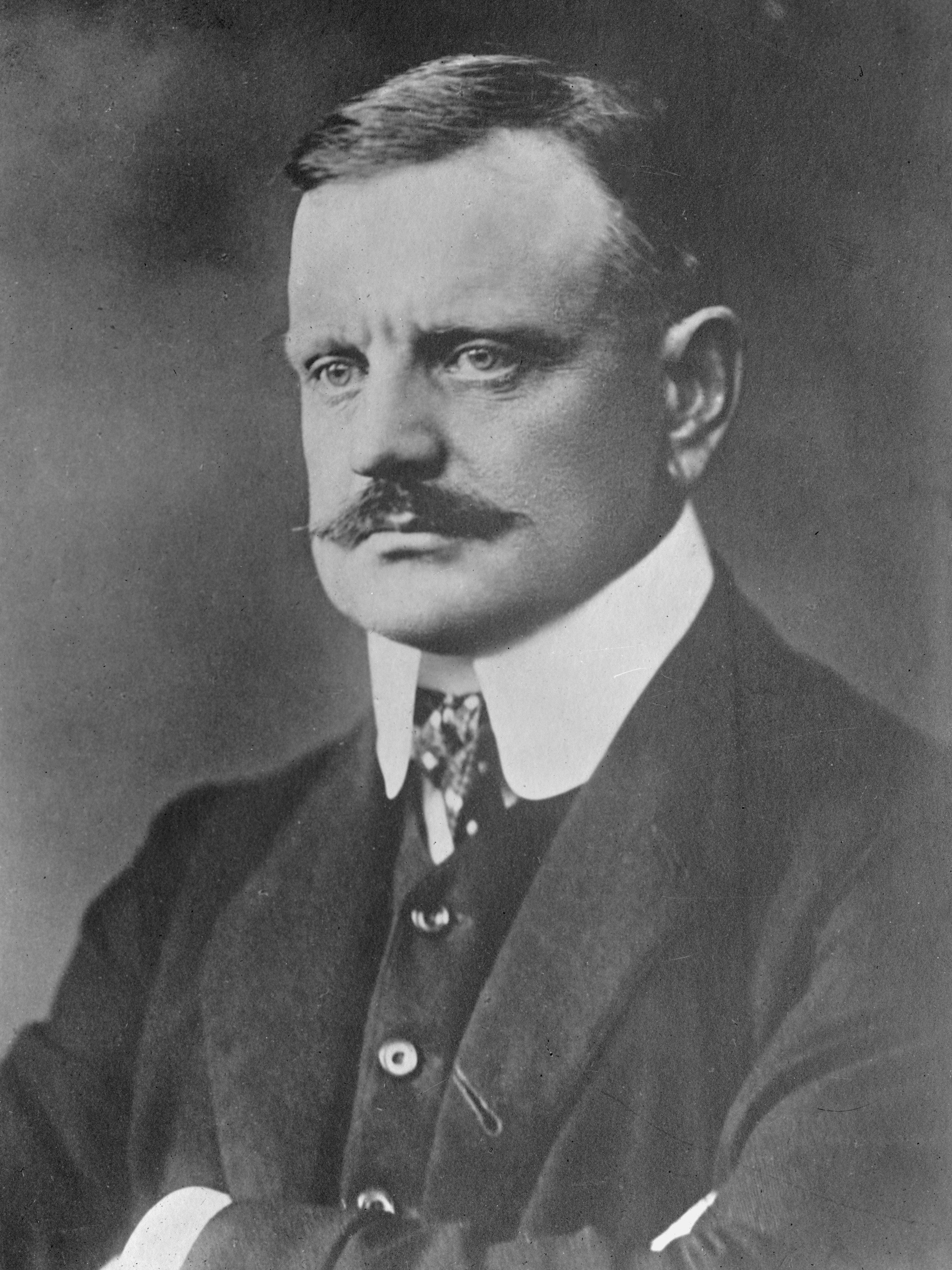
- The composer in 1913
- Catalogue: JS 189
- Opus: 54
- Composed: 1908
- Performed: 8 April 1908
- Scoring: orchestra

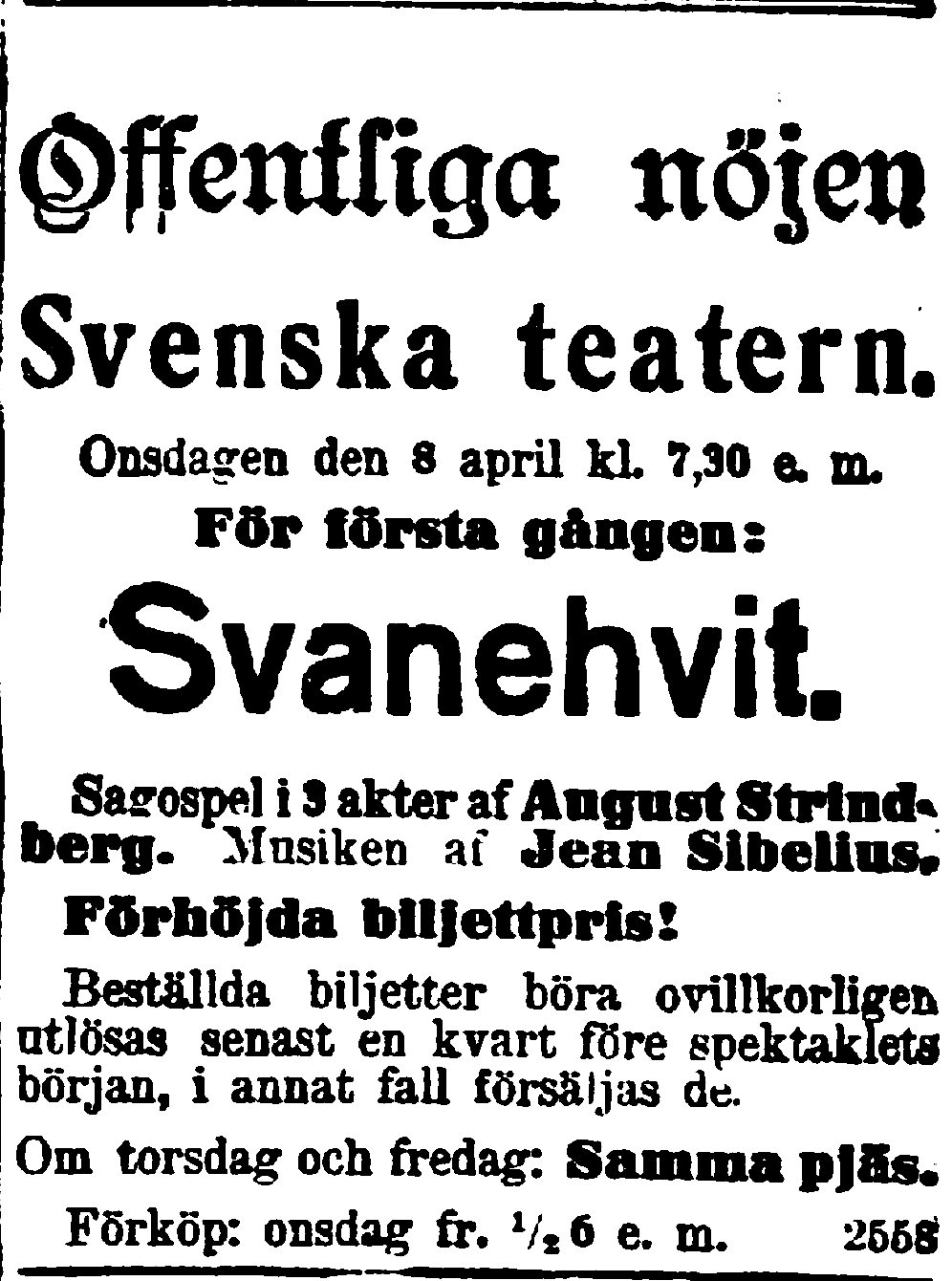
An 8 April 1908 advertisement from Nya Pressen promoting the premiere of Sibelius's incidental music to Swanwhite

Swanwhite (Swedish: Svanevit), JS 189, is incidental music for orchestra by Jean Sibelius for a play of the same name by August Strindberg. It consists of a horn call and thirteen other movements.

== Background ==
Swedish actress Harriet Bosse had been impressed by one of Sibelius' earlier works, incidental music for the play Pelléas and Mélisande, after having played the role of Mélisande in 1906. Thus, Bosse suggested to Strindberg for Sibelius to score music to his play, Swanwhite.

The play Swanwhite was written in 1902. It follows the tale of a princess, Swanwhite (that lives with her father, the Duke, and her evil stepmother), who is set to be married to a neighbouring king, but instead falls in love with his messenger, a prince. Although their relationship is approved by their late mothers, represented by swans, Swanwhite's stepmother works to sabotage it.

Sibelius completed the work in 1908 and conducted the first performance at Helsinki's Swedish Theatre on 8 April 1908. In 1909, Sibelius drew from it a suite in seven movements, Op. 54. The suite was given a British premiere on 29 September 1909 at the Promenade Concerts, under the baton of Henry Wood at Queen's Hall.

== Structure ==
=== Original score ===
Fourteen movements accompany the play.

Act 1

I. Largo

The Duke is called to war by a two-note horn call.

II. Comodo

The prince arrives to the castle where Swanwhite lives. The repeated flute and clarinet notes represent the calls of a peacock.

III. Adagio

A chord plays as a swan, the symbol for Swanwhite's dead mother, flies past.

Act 2

IV. Lento assai

A harp is imitated by strings using pizzicato. Later on, when Sibelius compiled the Swanwhite suite, he added a part for an actual harp.

V. Adagio

A chord plays as a swan, the symbol for Swanwhite's dead mother, flies past.

VI. Lento - Comodo - Lento - Allegro

The music accompanies the actions of the play, which at this point is without dialogue. A clock is depicted by a triangle, and a robin by a flute.

VII. Andantino

Scored for strings, this movement imagines the conversation between the prince and Swanwhite, as the play is still without dialogue.

VIII. Andante

Solemn music depicts the prince, following his quarrel with Swanwhite.

IX. Lento

A slow waltz in E flat minor. The prince is to be married to Swanwhite's sister, but Swanwhite takes her place at the wedding.

X. Moderato

A violin melody accompanied by horns and cello, as the stepmother bursts into the room where Swanwhite and the prince are, and the prince goes into hiding.

Act 3

XI. Allegretto: Swanwhite

This movement bears heavy resemblance to the second movement of Sibelius' later 5th symphony, and depicts the prince returning to Swanwhite.

XII. Largamente

Horns depict Swanwhite calling her father back from war.

XIII. Adagio

This movement foreshadows the third movement of Sibelius' later 4th symphony, and accompanies the moment when the prince's dead body is brought to Swanwhite. It is combined with the final movement in the later suite adaptation.

XIV: Largamente molto

The final movement has strong religious atmosphere, with all the characters praising God when the prince is revived. It is combined with the thirteenth movement in the later suite adaptation.

=== Suite ===
In the 1909 suite, adapted from the incidental music, Sibelius condensed and removed material into seven movements. Additionally, the suite was adapted to accommodate a larger wind section, as well as a harp, although the organ part in the original score was removed.

I. Påfågeln (The Peacock)
II. Harpan (The Harp)
III. Tärnorna med rosor (The Maidens with Roses)
IV. Hör rödhaken slå (Listen! The Robins sings)
V. Prinsen allena (The Prince Alone)
VI. Svanevit och prinsen (Swanwhite and the Prince)
VII. Lovsång (Song of Praise)

== Discography ==
The sortable table below lists all commercially available recordings of the complete incidental music to Swanwhite (JS 189):

Conductor	Orchestra	Rec.	Duration	Label
Osmo Vänskä	Lahti Symphony Orchestra	1996	26:22	BIS (BIS-CD-815)
Leif Segerstam	Turku Philharmonic Orchestra	2014	29:29	Naxos (8.573341)

The sortable table below lists commercially available recordings of the Swanwhite suite:

Conductor	Orchestra	Rec.	Duration	Label	Notes
Thomas Beecham	Royal Philharmonic Orchestra	1955	21:22	BBC Legends (BBCL 4041-2)	Live, Sibelius's 90th birthday concert at Royal Festival Hall
Jussi Jalas	Hungarian State Symphony Orchestra	1976	23:18	London Records (CS 7005)	
Neeme Järvi	Gothenburg Symphony Orchestra	1987	25:03	BIS (BIS-CD-359)	
Yondani Butt	Royal Philharmonic Orchestra	1989	24:38	ASV (CD DCA 649)	
fi:Petri Sakari	Iceland Symphony Orchestra	1993	18:54	Chandos (CHAN 9158)	Only movements 2, 3, 5-7
Jussi Jalas	Hungarian State Symphony Orchestra	1996	24:06	London Records (448 267-2)	
Pekka Kuusisto	Tapiola Sinfonietta	2006	23:09	Ondine (ODE 1074-5)	

== Literature ==
- Tomi Mäkelä: "Jean Sibelius und seine Zeit" (German), Laaber-Verlag, Regensburg 2013

== Additional reading ==
- Kurki, Eija (2023). "Swanwhite: The Original Incidental Music". SibeliusOne.com. Sibelius One.
