= Turku Philharmonic Orchestra =

Finnish orchestra

- Symphony orchestra
- Native name: Turun Filharmoninen Orkesteri; Åbo Filharmoniska Orkester
- Founded: 1790; 236 years ago
- Location: Turku, Finland
- Concert hall: Music Hall Fuuga
- Principal conductor: John Storgårds
- Website: Official website

The Turku Philharmonic Orchestra (TPO; Finnish: Turun filharmoninen orkesteri, TFO), formerly known as the Turku City Orchestra (Turun kaupunginorkesteri), is the oldest orchestra in Finland and one of the oldest continuously operating symphony orchestras in the world. The orchestra based in Turku consists of 74 musicians, making it the fifth largest symphony orchestra in Finland.

The orchestra was founded in 1790 under the name Turun Soitannollinen Seura (Musical Society of Turku). Its concerts featured works by composers such as Joseph Haydn and Ludwig van Beethoven while they were still alive. Jean Sibelius conducted his own music in a total of 18 concerts. In 1927, the municipality of Turku took ownership of the ensemble, with Tauno Hannikainen as the orchestra's first chief conductor under municipal management.

Juha Kangas served as principal guest conductor from 2001 to 2011, and Julian Rachlin from 2017 to 2023. Starting in autumn 2023, Christian Kluxen has taken on the role of principal guest conductor.

In January 2024, the orchestra announced the appointment of John Storgårds as its next chief conductor, effective with the 2024–2025 season, with an initial contract through the spring of 2028. The honorary conductors of the orchestra include Paavo Berglund, who collaborated with the orchestra for over half a century, and Leif Segerstam.

Since 1979, the orchestra has regularly recorded Finnish music. It has since recorded commercially for such labels as Ondine, Finlandia, and Naxos Records. With Leif Segerstam, the orchestra has released a series of albums for Naxos of the music of Jean Sibelius. The Orchestra's Christmas album with Karita Mattila and the album Finnish Classical Favorites have both achieved platinum sales. The orchestra began to release monthly streaming videos of selected concerts in September 2016.

Until 2026 the orchestra mainly performed at the Turku Concert Hall, completed in 1952, which was Finland's first purpose-built concert hall. In autumn 2026 it moved to the new music centre Fuuga by the Aura River. The building opened to the public on 26 October 2026 and its main hall seats about 1,300.

== Principal conductors ==
- Tauno Hannikainen (1927–1928)
- Toivo Haapanen (1928–1929)
- Tauno Hannikainen (1929–1939)
- Eero Selin (1940–1941)
- Ole Edgren (1941–1962)
- Jorma Panula (1963–1965)
- Paavo Rautio (1965–1974)
- Pertti Pekkanen (1974–1986)
- Igor Bezrodnyi (1986–1990)
- Jacques Mercier (1990–1995)
- Hannu Lintu (1998–2001)
- Tibor Bogányi (2003–2006)
- Petri Sakari (2007–2011)
- Leif Segerstam (2012–2019)
- Olli Mustonen (2021–2023)
- John Storgårds (2024–present)
