= Turku Concert Hall =

- Turun konserttitalo/Åbo konserthus
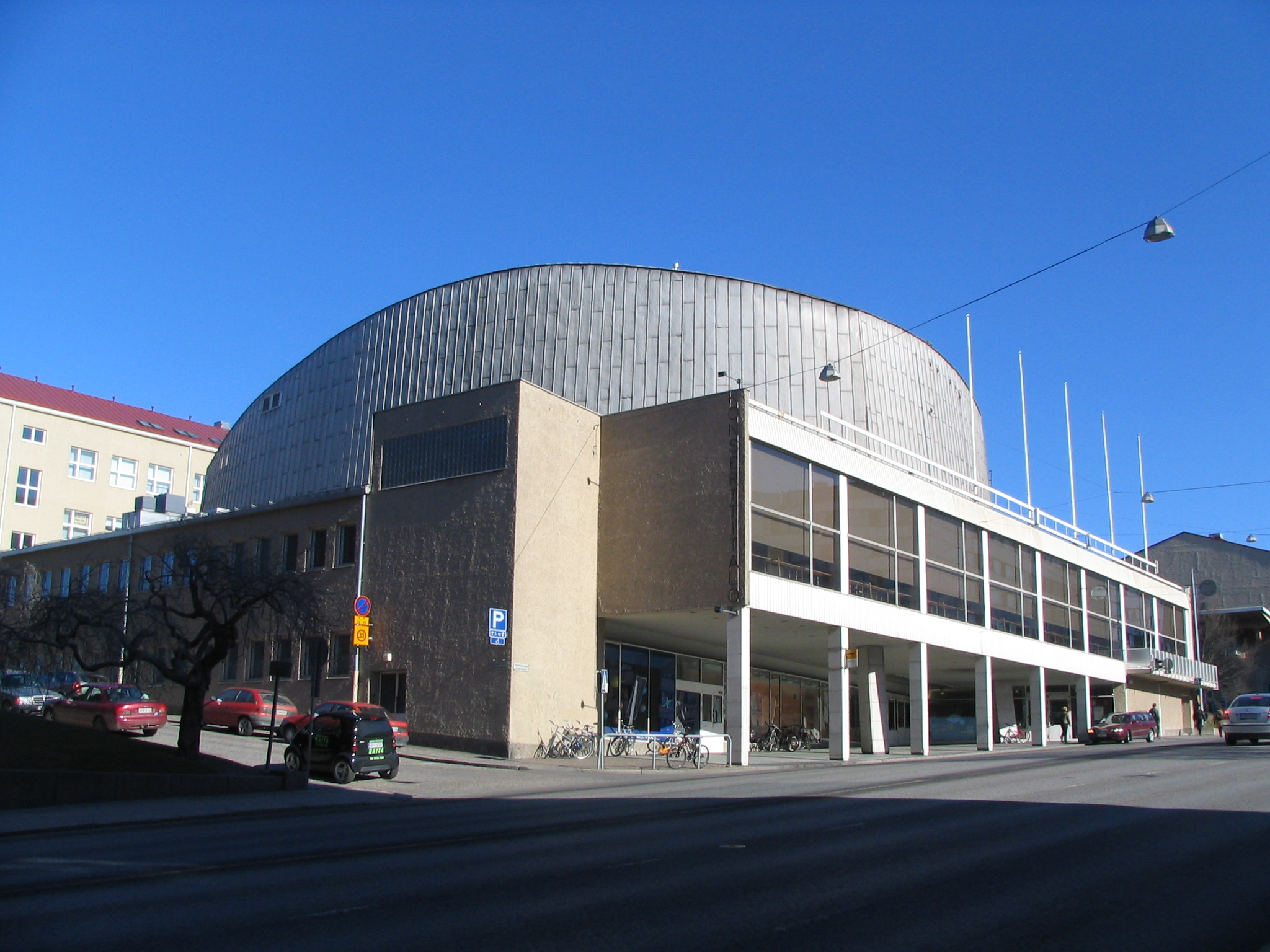
- Turku Concert Hall

General information
- Architectural style: Modern architecture
- Location: Turku, Finland, Aninkaistenkatu 9
- Coordinates: 60°27′20″N 22°16′14″E
- Completed: 1952

Design and construction
- Architect: Risto-Veikko Luukkonen

Turku Concert Hall (Finnish: Turun konserttitalo, Swedish: Åbo konserthus) is located on the north side of the Puutori market square in Turku, Finland. The hall was designed by architect Risto-Veikko Luukkonen and constructed in 1952. It was the first concert hall in Finland. The Turku Philharmonic Orchestra primarily performs at the concert hall but there are many top international venues that perform there as well.

There is one auditorium in the building and it was designed for concerts. Its audience capacity is 1,002. The acoustics are excellent. In addition to concerts, conferences, plays, fairs and other events take place in the hall.

After the new Music Hall Fuuga opens in late 2026, the "old" concert hall will be used by an event organiser, and host rave parties and circus performances.
