= Akademiska Sångföreningen =

Finland-Swedish academic male-voice choir at the University of Helsinki

The Academic Male Voice Choir of Helsinki Akademiska Sångföreningen
- Choir
- Logotype
- Origin: Helsinki, Grand Duchy of Finland, Russian Empire (today Helsinki, Finland)
- Founded: 1838; 188 years ago
- Founder: Fredrik (Friedrich) Pacius
- Genre: Male-voice choral
- Members: Ca 60 active
- Chief conductor: Elisa Huovinen
- Choir admission: Semiannual auditions
- Headquarters: Helsinki, Finland
- Affiliation: University of Helsinki
- Associated groups: The Academic Female Voice Choir Lyran; The YL Male Voice Choir; The Helsinki University Symphony Orchestra
- Website: akademen.com

The Academic Male Voice Choir of Helsinki (Swedish: Akademiska Sångföreningen, lit. 'The Academic Song Association', Finland Swedish: [ɑkɑˈdeːmiskɑ ˈsoŋfœrˌeːniŋen]), abbreviated AS, colloquially also known as Akademen (Note: Construed Swedish definite form related to akademisk, 'academic', but without lexical meaning.) (Finland Swedish: [ɑkɑˈdeːmen]), is a Finland-Swedish academic male-voice choir in Helsinki, Finland. The choir was founded in 1838 by Fredrik Pacius and is the oldest extant choir in Finland. It is one of two male-voice choirs affiliated with the University of Helsinki, the other being the oldest extant Finnish-language choir, the YL Male Voice Choir (Finnish: Ylioppilaskunnan Laulajat). Furthermore, it is one of two Swedish-language choirs affiliated with the University of Helsinki, the other being the Academic Female Voice Choir Lyran (Swedish: Akademiska Damkören Lyran).

== History ==
=== Overview ===
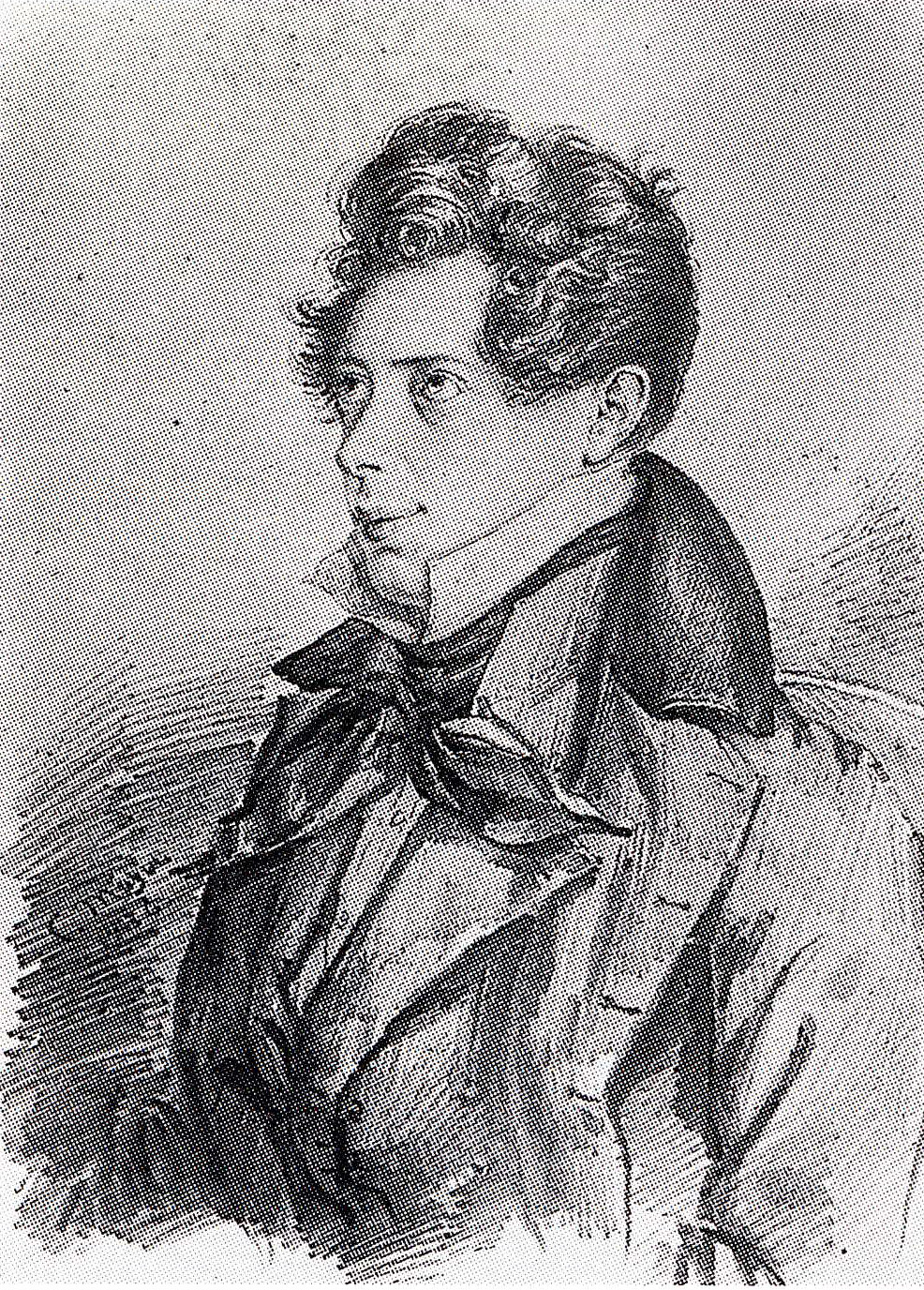
Drawing of the young Pacius by Mazér

Akademiska Sångföreningen was founded no later than during the spring term of 1838 by Fredrik Pacius (né Friedrich Pacius), music lecturer at the Imperial Alexander University of Finland (today the University of Helsinki) and sometimes known as "the father of Finnish music", originally under the name Akademiska Sångsällskapet (Note: Originally spelt Akademiska Sång-Sälskapet), 'The Academic Song Society'. The choir is thus the oldest extant one in Finland. The name Akademiska Sångföreningen was introduced no later than in 1846.

During the 19th century the choir became a symbol of national awakening in the emerging Finnish nation, at the time part of the Russian Empire as the Grand Duchy of Finland. On 13 May 1848, Pacius' composition Vårt land, 'Our Land', set to the poem by Johan Ludvig Runeberg, was performed for the first time by the choir, conducted by Pacius, during the students' celebration of the Flora Day. The composition was to become the national anthem of the Finnish nation.

In the 1850s and 60s, elite triple quartets from within the choir's ranks (Swedish: "sångartolfvor", lit. 'singer twelves') participated in raising the funds necessary to build what is today known as the Old Student House in Helsinki (Swedish: Gamla studenthuset, Finnish: Vanha ylioppilastalo), by travelling the country performing. The Old Student House was finished in 1870 and is still the location for the choir's weekly rehearsals.

During the second half of the 20th century, the choir, directed by modernist Erik Bergman, came to carve out new paths for the male-voice choir tradition in Finland, proving that this genre of music was able to exhibit superior musical qualities as well. After Bergman, jazz musician Henrik Otto Donner carried on this tradition.

At end of the 1970s and the beginning of the 80s the choir was engaged in lighter types of music. The Akademen à la carte concerts in Finlandia Hall were decidedly successful and, when necessary, members of the choir would compose pieces of music themselves.

During the 20th century the choir had several prominent conductors: Bengt Carlson, Nils-Eric Fougstedt, Erik Bergman, Henrik Otto Donner, Markus Westerlund, Eric-Olof Söderström, Tom Eklundh, John Schultz and Henrik Wikström all directed the choir. The most recent chief conductor Dr Kari Turunen, Doctor of Music, was appointed 2008 and stepped down in 2019 after the spring term, having been appointed artistic director of the Vancouver Chamber Choir, beginning the autumn term 2019. In June 2019, Elisa Huovinen, Master of Music, was appointed his successor as chief conductor of Akademiska Sångföreningen.

=== List of chief conductors ===
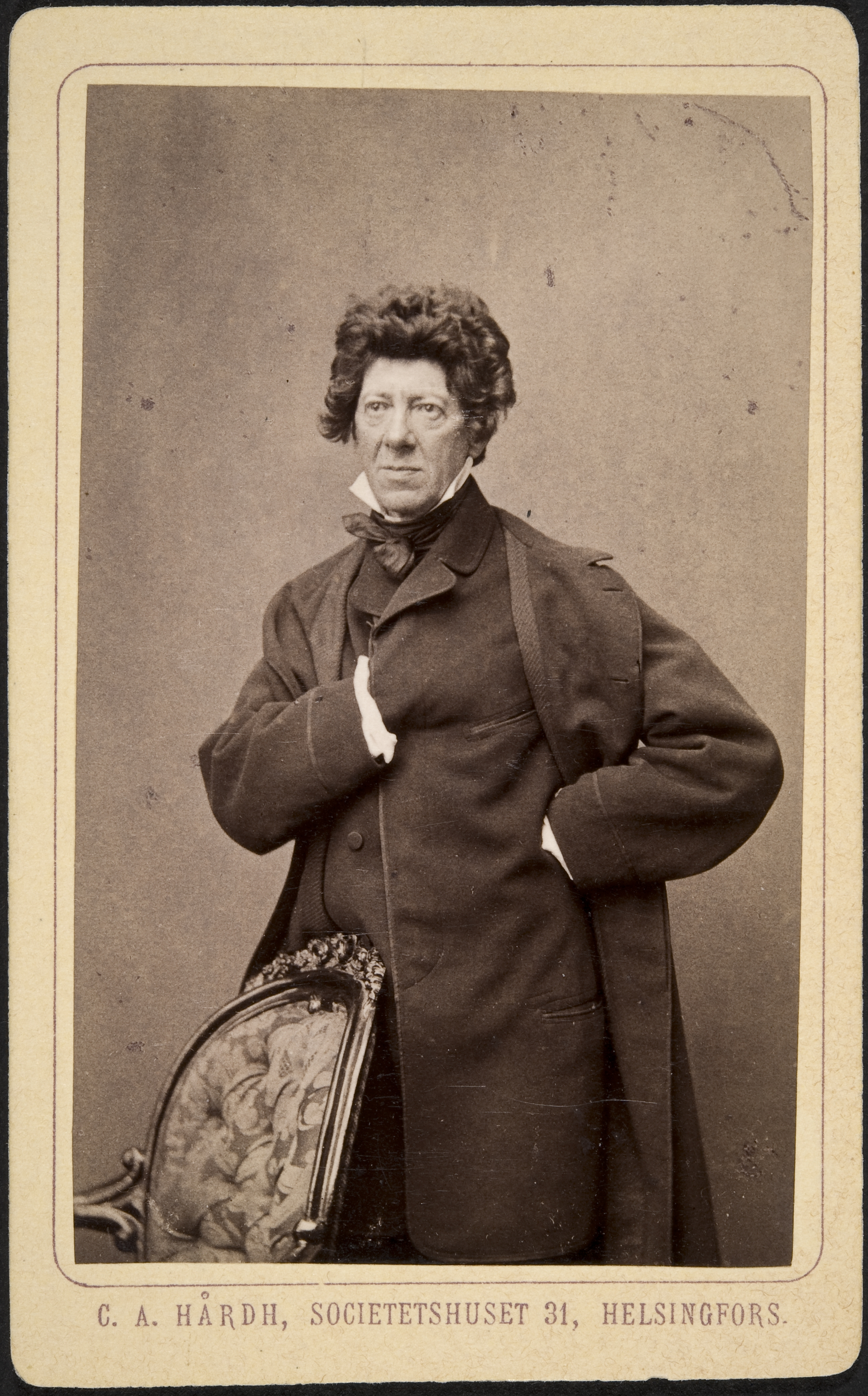
Fredrik Pacius (1809–1891), conductor 1838–1846

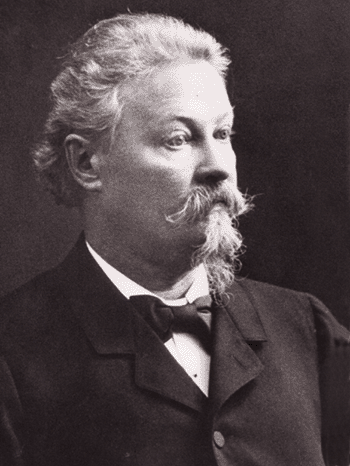
Martin Wegelius (1846–1906), conductor 1870–1871 and 1873–1876

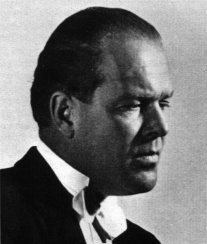
Nils-Eric Fougstedt (1910–1961), conductor 1946–1950

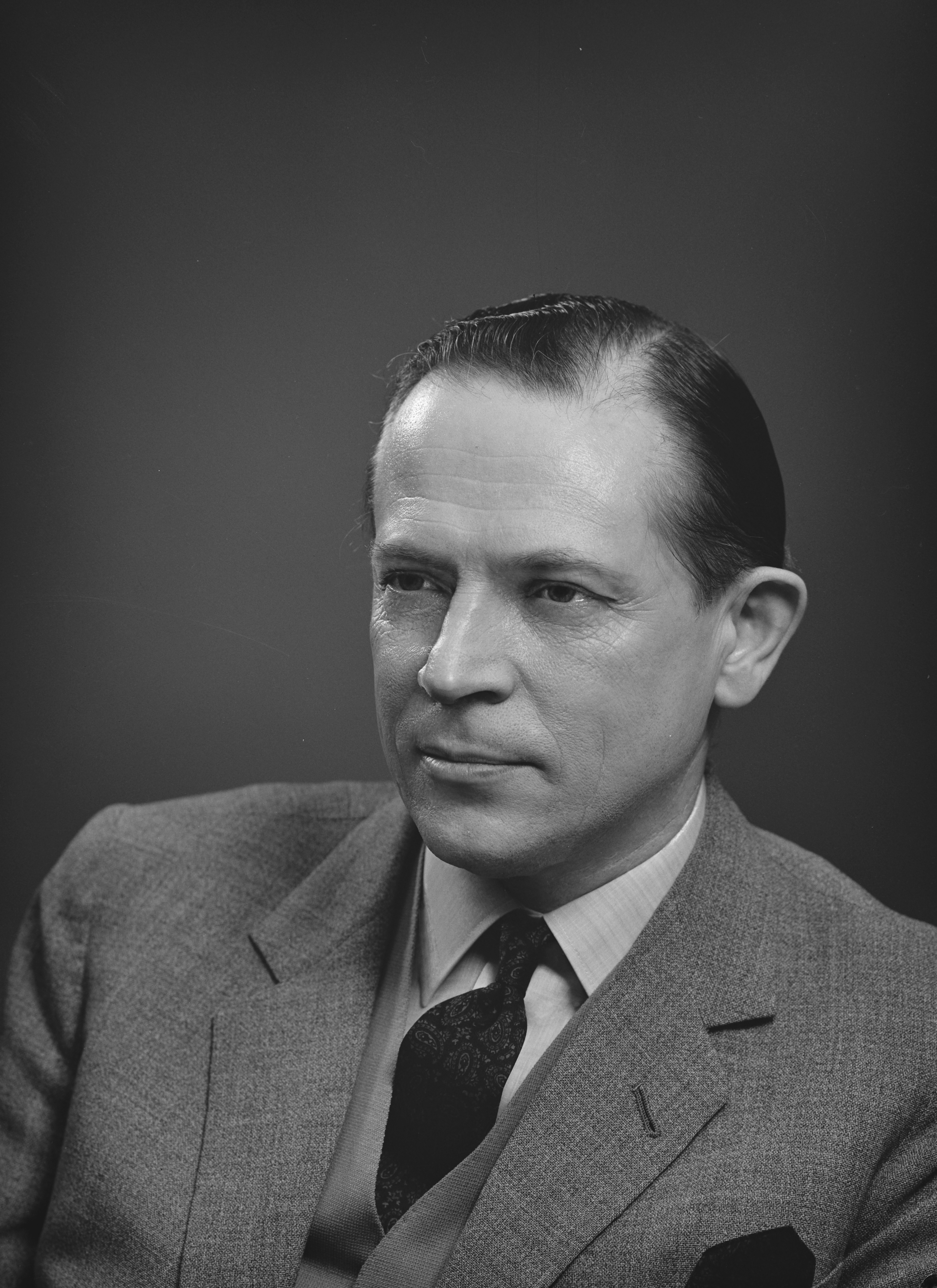
Erik Bergman (1911–2006), conductor 1950–1969

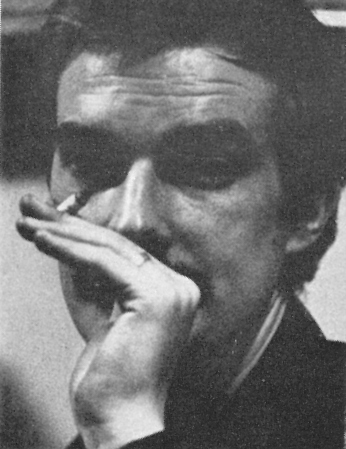
Henrik Otto Donner (1939–2013), conductor 1969–1976

The chief conductor is the artistic director of the choir.

Chief conductors
From (semester)	To (semester) incl.	Consecutive tenure	Total tenure	Name	Notes
1838, spring	1846, spring	8 1/2 yrs	8 1/2 yrs	Fredrik Pacius	Founder
1846, autumn	1850, spring	4 yrs	4 yrs	August Lindelöf	
Temporary conductors from the autumn semester of 1850 to the spring semester of 1857
1857, autumn	1860, spring	3 yrs	3 yrs	Gustaf Magnus Cederhvarf	
1860, autumn	1864, spring	4 yrs	4 yrs	Henrik Gustaf Borenius	
1864, autumn	1865, spring	1 yr	1 yr	Johannes Edvard Pacius	
1865, autumn	1866, spring	1 yr	1 yr	Uno Kurtén	Appointed Honorary Member in 1920
1866, autumn	1868, spring	2 yrs	3 yrs	Lorentz Nikolai Achté	
1868, autumn	1869, autumn	1 1/2 yrs	1 1/2 yrs	Nils Peter Paldani	
1870, spring	1871, spring	1 1/2 yrs	4 1/2 yrs	Martin Wegelius	
1871, autumn	1872, spring	1 yr	3 yrs	Lorentz Nikolai Achté	
1872, autumn	1873, spring	1 yr	1 yr	David Hahl	
1873, autumn	1876, spring	3 yrs	4 1/2 yrs	Martin Wegelius	
1876, autumn	1879, spring	3 yrs	6 1/2 yrs	Gösta Sohlström	Appointed Honorary Member in 1915
1879, autumn	1879, autumn	2 yr	2 yr	Oscar Mechelin	
1880, spring	1880, spring	2 yr	2 yr	Nils Kiljander	
1880, autumn	1880, autumn	2 yr	2 yr	Jarl Werner Holmberg	
1881, spring	1881, autumn	1 yr	1 yr	Edvard Rindell	
1882, spring	1882, spring	2 yr	2 yr	Oscar W. Moberg	
Interregnum from the autumn semester of 1882 to the spring semester of 1884
1884, autumn	1884, autumn	2 yr	2 yr	Artur Relander	
1885, spring	1892, autumn	8 yrs	11 1/2 yrs	Carl von Knorring	Appointed Honorary Conductor in 1900, Honorary Member in 1910
1893, spring	1894, spring	1 1/2 yrs	2 1/2 yrs	Emil Leander	
1894, autumn	1894, autumn	2 yr	11 1/2 yrs	Carl von Knorring	Appointed Honorary Conductor in 1900, Honorary Member in 1910
1895, spring	1895, autumn	1 yr	1 yr	Uno Öller	
1896, spring	1899, spring	3 1/2 yrs	6 1/2 yrs	Gösta Sohlström	Appointed Honorary Member in 1915
1899, autumn	1902, spring	3 yrs	11 1/2 yrs	Carl von Knorring	Appointed Honorary Conductor in 1900, Honorary Member in 1910
1902, autumn	1903, spring	1 yr	2 yrs	Lennart Hallman	
1903, autumn	1904, spring	1 yr	1 yr	Kurt Ångelin	
1902, autumn	1905, spring	1 yr	2 yrs	Lennart Hallman	
Vacancy during the autumn semester of 1905
1906, spring	1906, autumn	1 yr	1 yr	Gustaf Mattsson	
Vacancy during the spring semester of 1907
1907, autumn	1908, spring	1 yr	1 yr	Alarik Uggla	
1908, autumn	1909, spring	1 yr	1 yr	Thure Sandelin	
1909, autumn	1911, spring	2 yrs	2 yrs	Gösta Enckell	
1911, autumn	1912, spring	1 yr	2 1/2 yrs	Emil Leander	
1912, autumn	1915, spring	3 yrs	3 yrs	Ragnar Hollmérus	
1915, autumn	1920, spring	5 yrs	5 yrs	Olof Wallin	
1920, autumn	1946, spring	26 yrs	26 yrs	Bengt Carlson	Appointed Honorary Conductor in 1932, Honorary Member in 1946
1946, autumn	1950, spring	4 yrs	4 yrs	Nils-Eric Fougstedt	
1950, autumn	1969, spring	19 yrs	19 yrs	Erik Bergman	Appointed Honorary Conductor in 1961, Honorary Member in 1969
1969, autumn	1976, spring	7 yrs	7 yrs	Henrik Otto Donner	
1976, autumn	1983, spring	7 yrs	7 yrs	Markus Westerlund	
1983, autumn	1985, spring	2 yrs	2 yrs	Eric-Olof Söderström	
1985, autumn	1990, spring	5 yrs	5 yrs	Tom Eklundh	
1990, autumn	1997, spring	7 yrs	7 yrs	John Schultz	Joint conductorship with Henrik Wikström
1997, autumn	2008, spring	11 yrs	18 yrs	Henrik Wikström	Total tenure inclusive of joint conductorship with John Schultz
2008, autumn	2019, spring	11 yrs	11 yrs	Kari Turunen	Appointed Honorary Conductor in 2019
2019, autumn	2019, autumn	1/2 yr	1/2 yr	Riku Laurikka	Acting conductor
2019, autumn				Elisa Huovinen	Incumbent, conductor de facto from 2020, spring

=== List of presidents ===
The president is the chairman of the committee.

Presidents
From	To	Name	Notes
No presidents proper before 1884
1884	1886	Hjalmar Londén	
No presidents proper from 1886 to 1895
1896	1896	Ossian Schauman	
No presidents proper from 1896 to 1902
1903	1905	Konstantin Bergman	
1905	1907	Verner Hougberg	
1908	1908	Guy Topelius	
1908	1911	Bruno A. Norén	
1911	1912	Gösta Juslén	
1912	1912	Axel A. Mörne	
1913	1913	Evert Ekroth	Acting
1913	1913	Widar Granholm	
1914	1915	Gösta Schybergson	
1916	1916	Evert Ekroth	
1916	1918	Gunnar Pehrman	
1919	1920	Torsten Sievers	
1920	1921	Werner von Troil	
1922	1923	Gösta Charpentier	
1923	1925	Knut von Hertzen	
1925	1926	Erik G. Såltin	
1926	1926	Erik Vaenerberg	
1927	1927	Håkan Lindberg	
1927	1928	Randall Nybom	
1928	1928	Olof Leineberg	
1929	1931	Knut von Hertzen	
1931	1932	Runar Hernberg	
1932	1934	Öyvind Stadius	
1934	1936	Carl-Erik Creutz	
1937	1937	Gösta Th. Lindblad	
1937	1940	Carl-Erik Creutz	
1940	1944	Nils Westerholm	
1945	1947	Olof Rosenius	
1947	1949	Per Erik Floman	
1949	1951	Bengt-Olof Nordman	
1951	1952	Tor H. Krause	
1952	1955	Eduard Pacius	
1955	1957	Johan Lindberg	
1957	1959	Carl-Mikael Tengström	
1959	1961	Carl-Henrik von Hertzen	
1961	1963	Christian Reims	
1963	1965	Erik Kihlman	
1965	1967	Christer Lindberg	
1967	1968	Lars-Axel Lindberg	
1968	1969	Bengt Rosenquist	
1969	1970	Carl-Johan Lundström	
1970	1972	Magnus Bargum	
1972	1974	Marcus Borgström	
1974	1975	Thomas Thesleff	
1975	1976	Håkan Nylund	
1976	1978	Ulf Sjöblad	
1978	1980	Krister Blomqvist	
1980	1982	Staffan Kurtén	
1982	1983	Magnus Pousette	
1983	1984	Kim Sjöholm	
1984	1988	Johan Aalto	Appointed Honorary Member in 2013
1988	1990	Torkel Tallqvist	
1990	1991	Björn Nykvist	
1991	1992	René Söderman	
1992	1993	Dominicus Björkstam	
1993	1994	Martin Hartman	
1994	1995	Ulf Ginman	
1995	1995	Leif Bergström	Acting
1996	1997	Mathias Nylund	
1998	2000	Dennis Holmlund	Appointed Honorary Member in 2023
2001	2003	Jonne Sandström	
2004	2005	Sebastian Perret	
2006	2007	Fredrik Welander	
2008	2009	Mathias Westermarck	
2010	2011	John Tallqvist	
2012	2013	Kasper Sundström	
2014	2015	Rasmus Kurtén	
2016	2018	Alexander Zilliacus	
2019	2019	Arthur Lindstedt	
2020	2021	Johan Nyman	
2022	2024	Björn Schauman	
2025	2025	Lars M. Huldén	
2026		Robin McCann	Incumbent

== Present activities ==
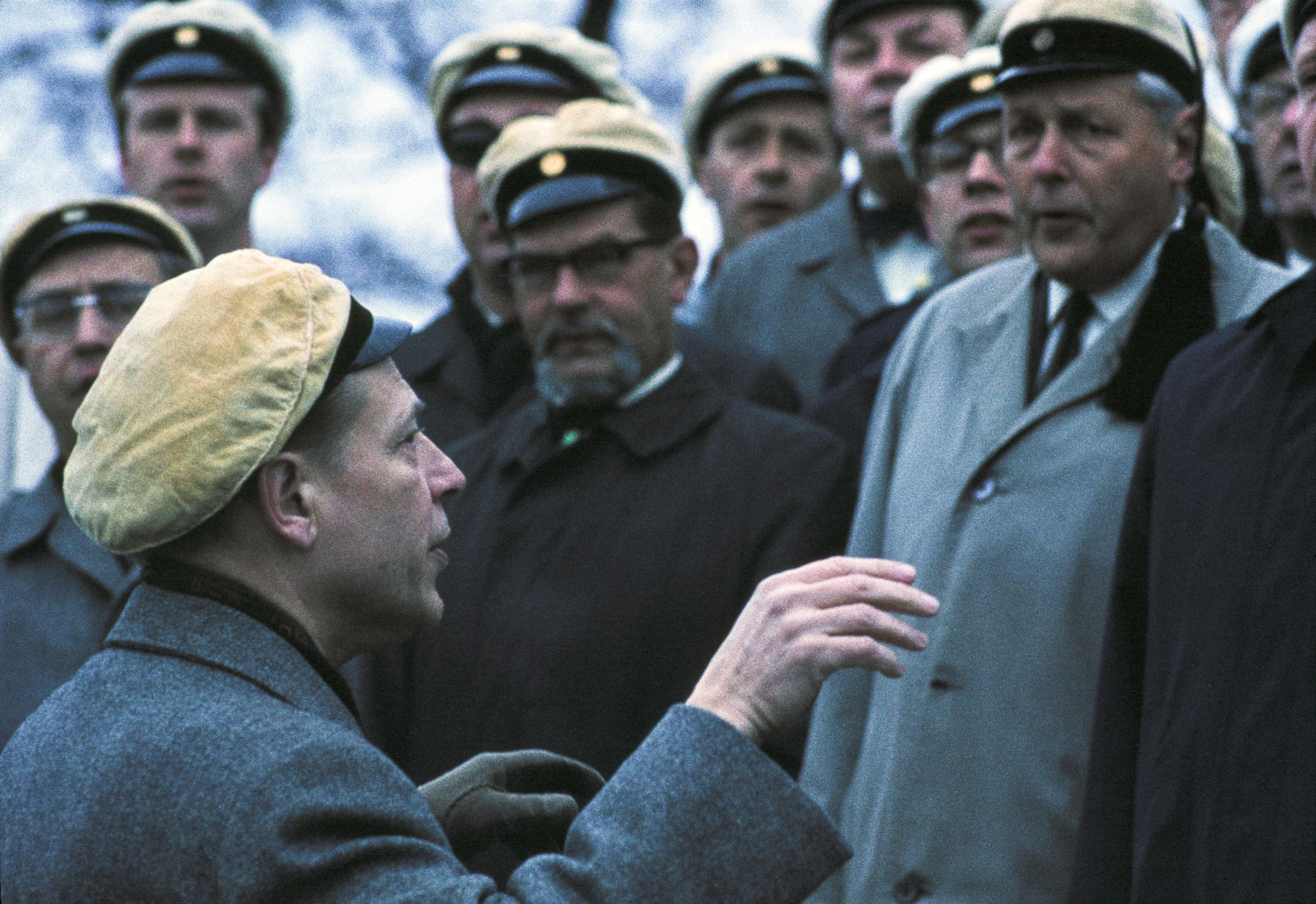
Erik Bergman conducting the choir on May Day 1968 in Helsinki

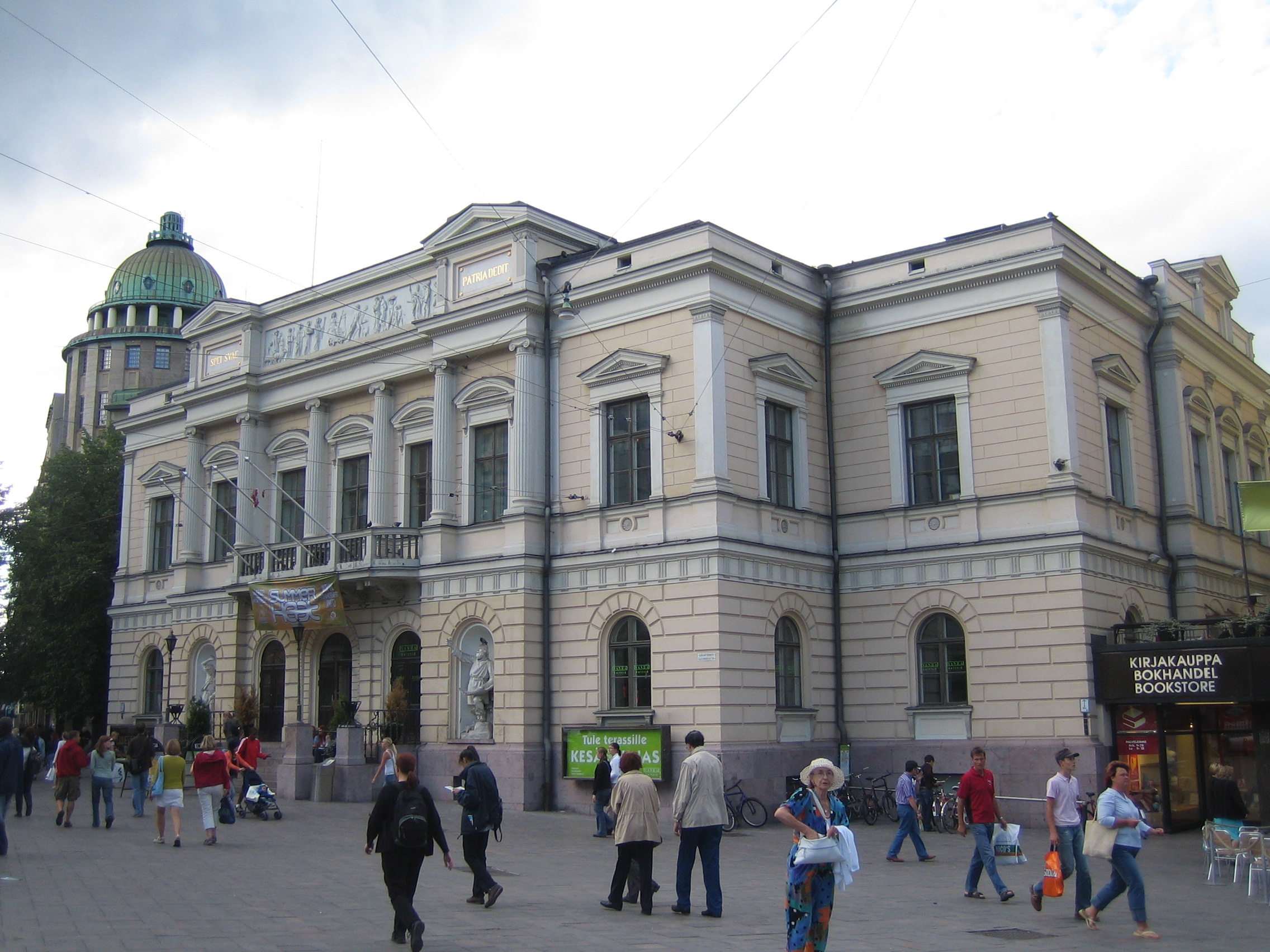
The Old Student House in Helsinki, where the choir rehearsed from inauguration in 1870 and throughout most of the 20th century, and as of 2016 rehearses every other semester

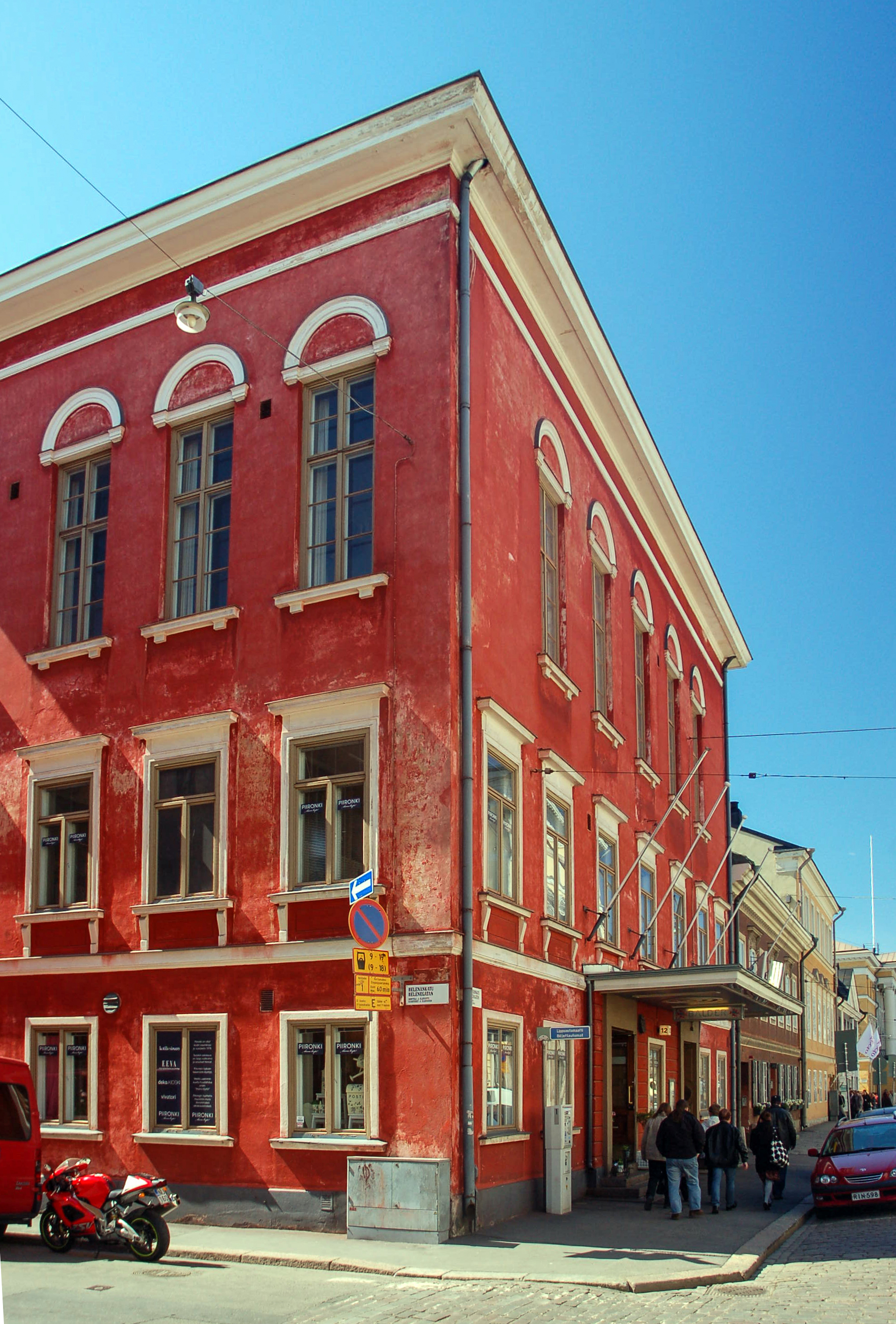
The Balder House in Helsinki, where the choir as of 2016 rehearses every other semester

Being the oldest extant male voice choir in Finland, Akademiska Sångföreningen has always cared particularly for the classical Finnish male voice repertoire. Among the composers whose compositions form part of the choir's standard repertoire are honorary members Jean Sibelius, Selim Palmgren and Erik Bergman, as well as fellow composers Toivo Kuula and Leevi Madetoja. Furthermore, being a Finland-Swedish organization, the choir has always seen it as a natural and important task to champion the Swedish-speaking minority culture in Finland. Hence, the standard repertoire encompasses not only choral works of Finnish and Finland-Swedish origin, but also many works of Swedish origin, for example by honorary member Hugo Alfvén.

As implied by its name, the choir is an academic or students' choir, and like its Helsinki sister choir the Academic Female Voice Choir Lyran (Swedish: Akademiska Damkören Lyran) an independent 'music corporation' (Swedish: musikkorporation, Finnish: musiikkikorporaatio) affiliated with the University of Helsinki. The choir presently comprises some 50 active singers, many of whom are university students. Concerts are given regularly in Finland, and the choir travels abroad frequently. In addition to most European countries, the choir has been on tour in Australia, New Zealand, Canada, the United States, Hong Kong, the Philippines, and Singapore.

Particularly in recent years, the choir has devoted itself to actively producing records, explicitly in order to document high quality male voice choir repertoire in Swedish. Apart from Swedish, the choir also sings in the parody language Transpiranto on the record Happi kvam pippi, which was released in 2006. A later album, Hymn to Finland, was produced by Swedish label BIS Records and documents works for male voice choir by founder Fredrik Pacius. The record was released on 19 March 2009, the 200th anniversary of Pacius' birth.

The choir maintains contacts with other similar choirs, in Finland in particular with male voice academic choirs Brahe Djäknar in Turku and the YL Male Voice Choir (Finnish: Ylioppilaskunnan Laulajat) in Helsinki, and in Sweden in particular with Orphei Drängar in Uppsala, Stockholm Academic Male Chorus (Swedish: Stockholms Studentsångare) in Stockholm, Linköping University Male Voice Choir (Swedish: Linköpings Studentsångare) in Linköping and Lund University Male Voice Choir (Swedish: Lunds Studentsångförening) in Lund.

Ever since 1954, the choir has collaborated extensively with the Academic Female Voice Choir Lyran (Swedish: Akademiska Damkören Lyran), the only other Swedish-language University of Helsinki choir. The two choirs give several annually recurring concerts together.

== Discography ==
Studio, live and selections albums primarily featuring the choir
Year	Title	Translation	Conductor(s)	Label	Format	Notes
1964	Akademiska Sångföreningen 1838–1963		Erik Bergman	The Finnish Broadcasting Company	LP	125th anniversary concert repertoire
1967	Bellman och serenader	'Carl Michael Bellman and serenades'	Erik Bergman	The Finnish Broadcasting Company	EP	
1975	Studentsången i Kajsaniemi	'The students' singing in Kaisaniemi Park'	Henrik Otto Donner	Akademiska Sångföreningen	LP	
1980	Etude		Markus Westerlund	Finlandia Records	LP	
1983	Magnificat		Markus Westerlund	Finlandia Records	LP	
1988	A la carte		Various	Akademiska Sångföreningen	LP	Selected live recordings from the Akademen à la carte concerts 1980–1987
1995	Första maj	'May Day'	John Schultz	Akademiska Sångföreningen	CD	
1999	Julstämning	'Christmas spirit'	Henrik Wikström, Kari Turunen	Akademiska Damkören Lyran & Akademiska Sångföreningen	CD	Christmas album; in collaboration with the Academic Female Voice Choir Lyran
2002	Skaparegestalter	'Creator figures'	Henrik Wikström	Fuga	CD	
2005	För ögonblicket	'At the moment'	Henrik Wikström	Fuga	CD	
2006	Happi kvam pippi		Henrik Wikström	Fuga	CD	Translations into the parody language Transpiranto
2009	Hymn to Finland: Fredrik Pacius: Works for Male-Voice Choir		Henrik Wikström	BIS Records	CD	
2011	Julen vi minns	'The Christmas we remember'	Kari Turunen, Jutta Seppinen	Akademiska Damkören Lyran & Akademiska Sångföreningen	CD	Christmas album; in collaboration with the Academic Female Voice Choir Lyran
2013	Från tidevarv till tidevarv	'From epoch unto epoch'	Various	Fuga	Triple CD	Selections album; released for the 175th anniversary
2013	Solglitter	'The sun's glistening'	Kari Turunen	Fuga	CD	
2016	I Dreamt: Beställningsverken 2007–2013	'I Dreamt: Works commissioned 2007–2013'	Kari Turunen	Fuga	CD	
2021	En del av det hela	'Part of the whole'	Elisa Huovinen		CD	
2025	Kristallström	'Crystal stream'	Elisa Huovinen		CD	
