= Old Student House, Helsinki =

Former student house of the Student Union of the University of Helsinki

Coordinates: 60°10′08.5″N 024°56′26″E

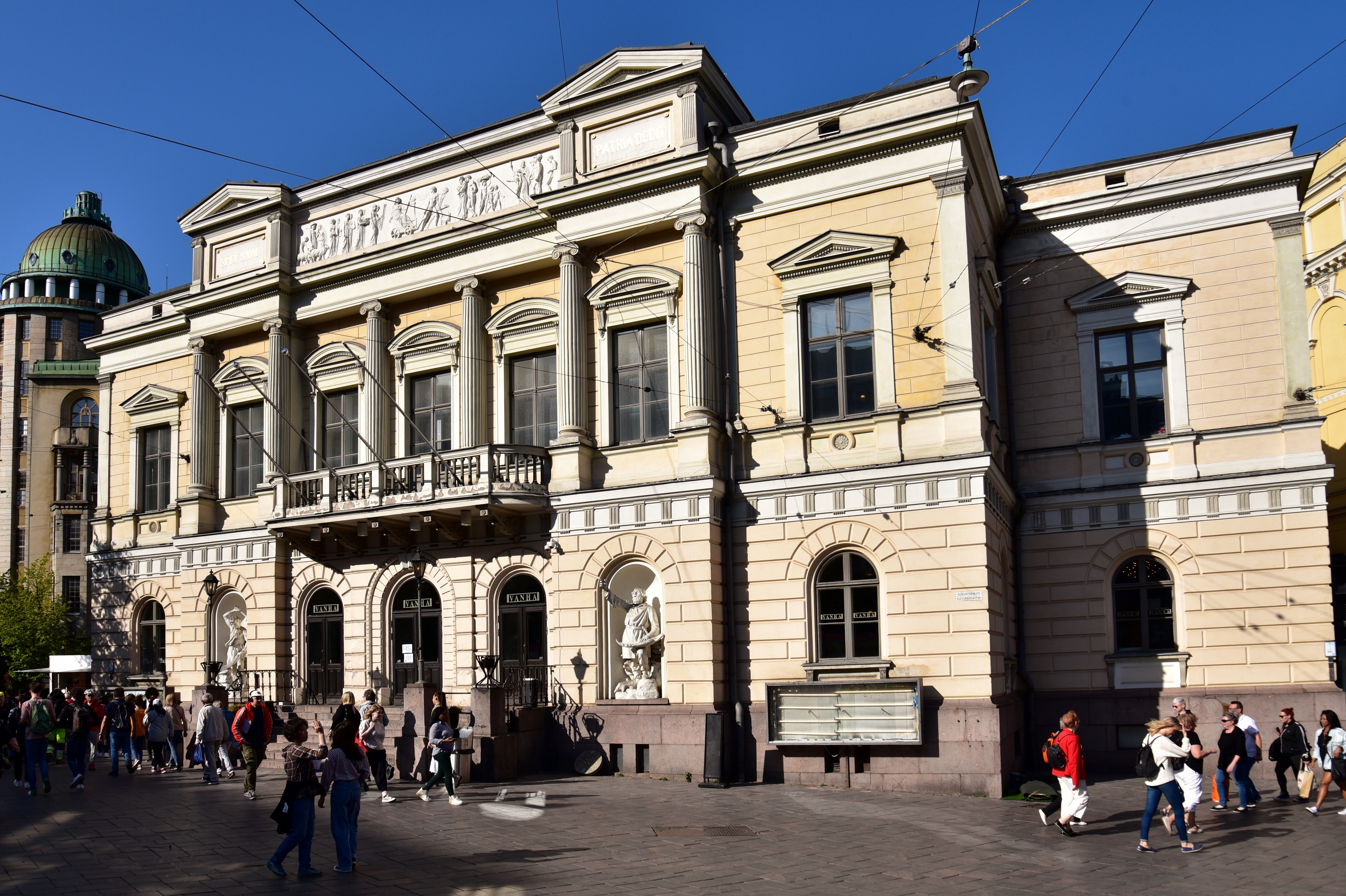
The Old Student House in 2019

The Old Student House (Finnish: Vanha ylioppilastalo, colloquially called Vanha, "the old one"; Swedish: Gamla studenthuset) is the former student house of the Student Union of the University of Helsinki, located in central Helsinki, Finland, near the crossing of Aleksanterinkatu and Mannerheimintie.

== Description ==
The building was designed by Axel Hampus Dalström and was completed in 1870. It represents the neo-Renaissance style of architecture.

The student house was originally built at the edge of the city centre, so the students' parties would not disturb other citizens. The construction was funded by a collection from the citizens. In dedication of this collection, the façade of the building bears the Latin inscription Spei suae patria dedit ("Fatherland gave to its hope"). Nowadays, the student house is located in the inner centre of Helsinki, near the Three Smiths Statue.

Near the student house is located the New Student House, completed in 1910. At that point the Old Student House got its current name. In 1938 there was a discussion about whether the Old Student House should be dismantled to give place for a new business house.

On November 25, 1968, one day prior to the Student Union's centennial celebration, a large group of students occupied the Old Student House which was designated as the location of the festivities. There was a fire in 1978 that badly damaged the building.

Old Student House contains many famous Kalevala themed works of art, such as Akseli Gallen-Kallela's mural Kullervo Rides to War and Robert Wilhelm Ekman's 390 cm tall painting Väinämöinen's Play.

== Choirs and orchestra ==
Three choirs and one symphony orchestra rehearse in the Music Hall of Old Student House:

- Akademiska Sångföreningen
- YL Male Voice Choir
- Helsinki University Symphony Orchestra
- Akademiska Damkören Lyran

== Gallery ==
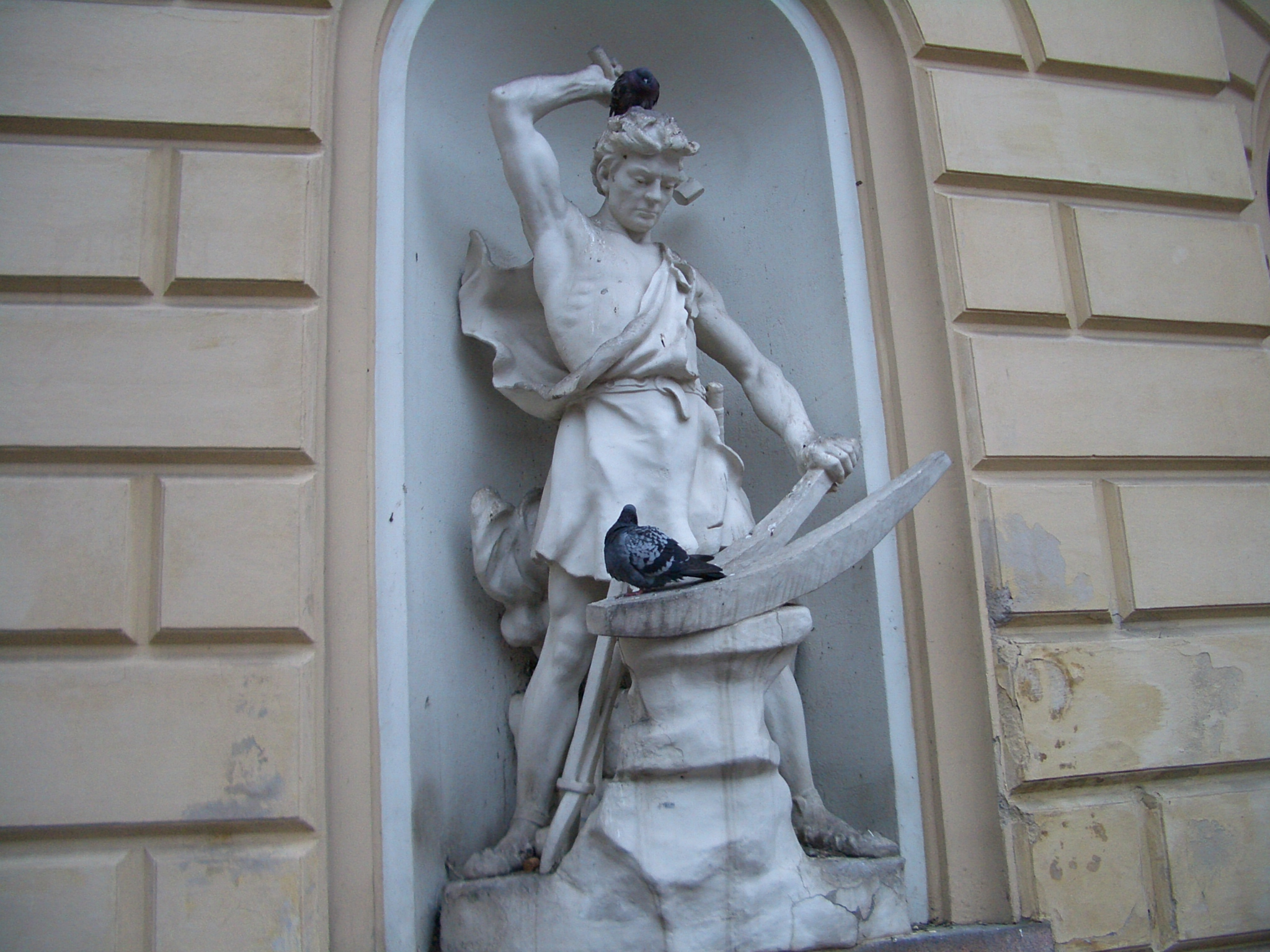
Ilmarinen by Robert Stigell, 1888

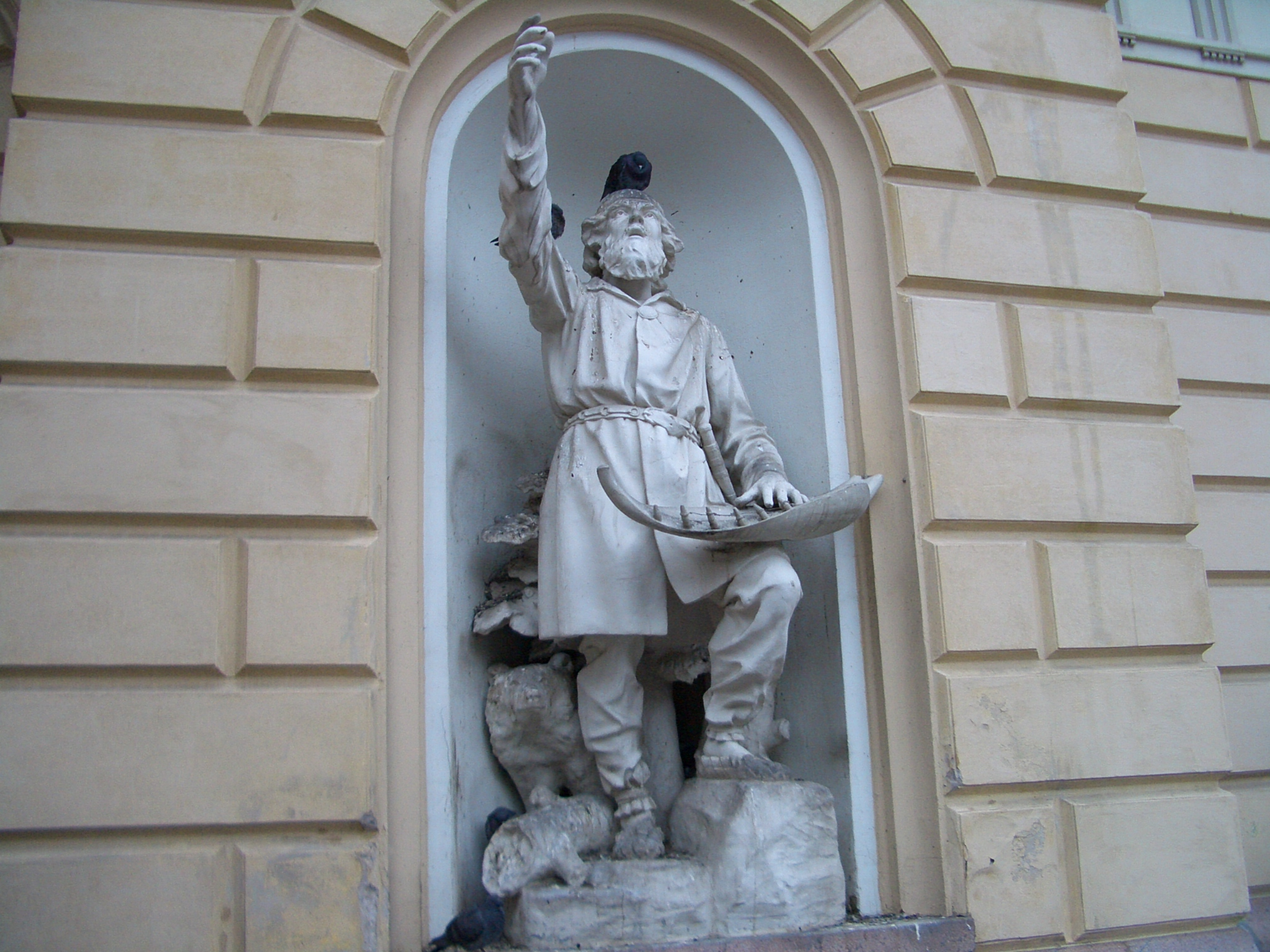
Väinämöinen by Robert Stigell, 1888

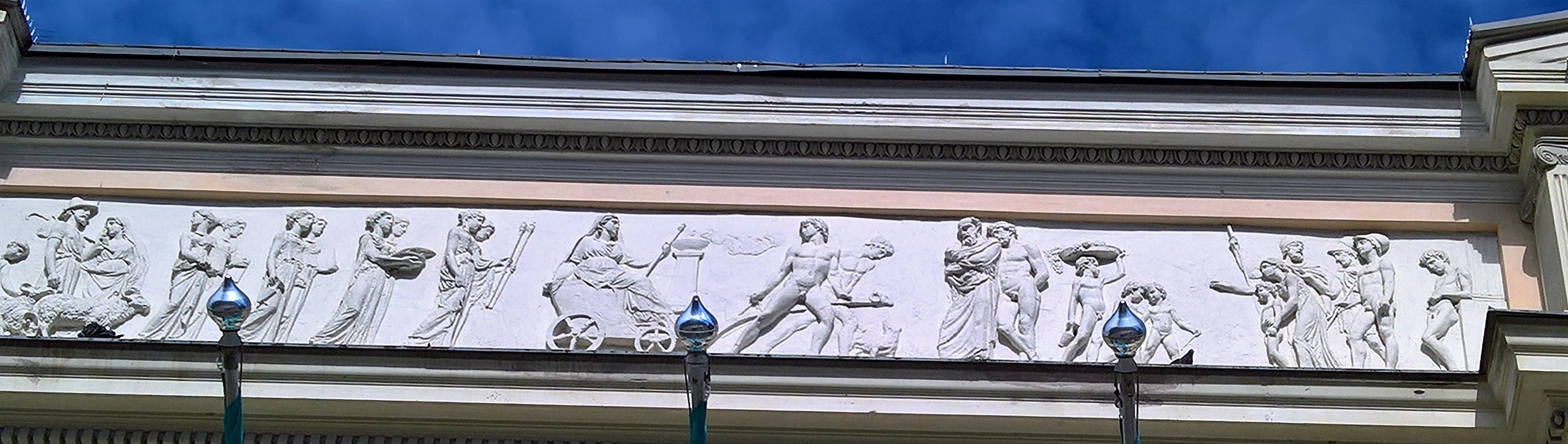
Kleobis and Biton by Walter Runeberg, 1878

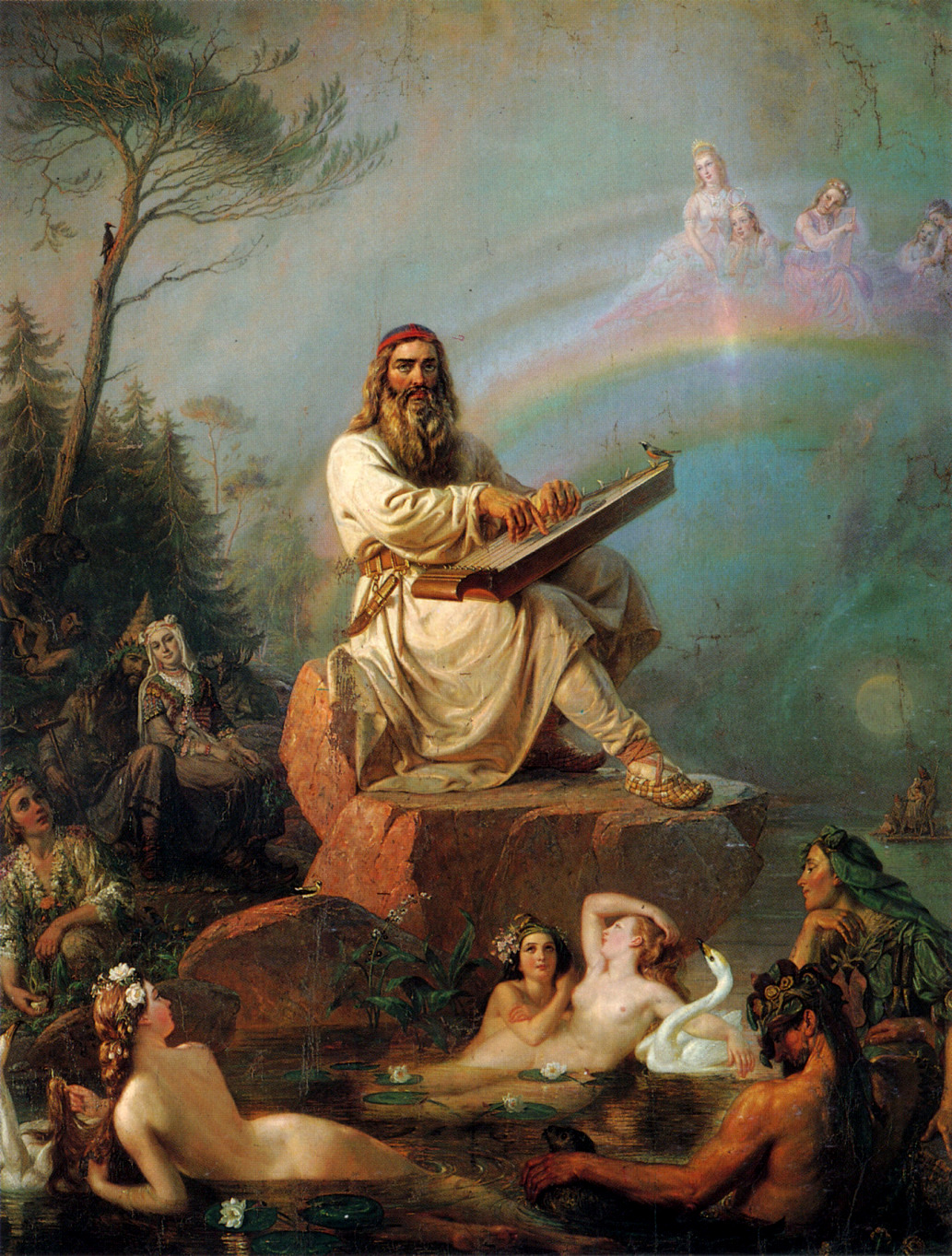
Väinämöinen's Play, Robert Wilhelm Ekman, 1866

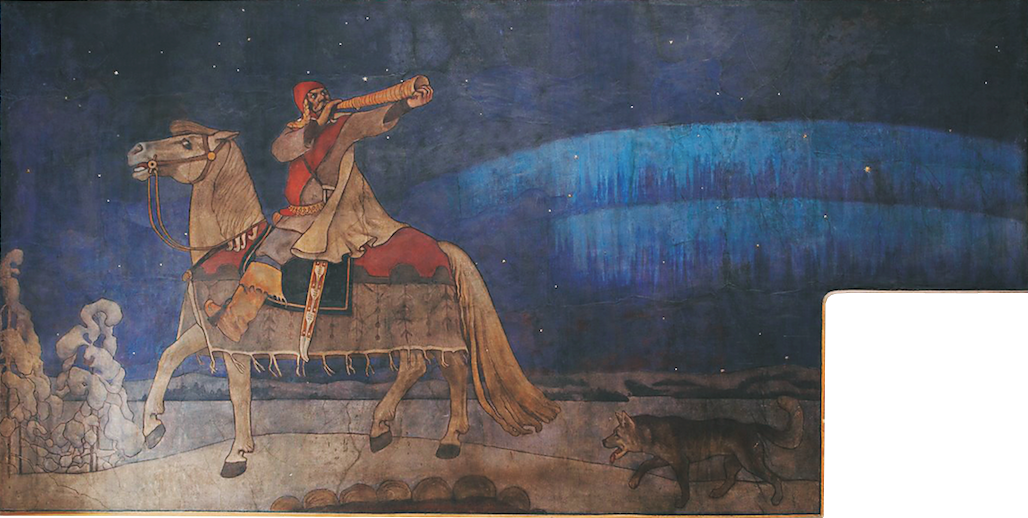
Kullervo Rides to War, mural by Akseli Gallen-Kallela, 1901
