= Petteri Salomaa =

Finnish operatic bass-baritone (born 1961)

Juha Petteri Salomaa (born 26 August 1961) is a Finnish operatic bass-baritone who has had an active international singing career in operas and concerts since the late 1970s. He has performed on more than 30 recordings with a variety of record labels, including Decca Records, Deutsche Grammophon, Harmonia Mundi, His Master's Voice, and Philips Records among others. He taught on the voice faculty at the Sibelius Academy from 2003 to 2008, and currently serves as a visiting professor of singing at the Royal College of Music, Stockholm.

== Life and career ==
Born in Helsinki as the son of opera singer Pekka Salomaa, Salomaa began his musical studies as a cellist. In 1976, at the age of 15, he entered the Sibelius Academy where he began to pursue studies as a vocalist for the first time. His vocal teachers have included Kim Borg, Hans Hotter, Yevgeny Nesterenko and Erik Saedén. In 1981, at the age of 20, he won the National Singing Competition in Lappeenranta. He earned a bachelor's degree from the Sibelius Academy in 1989 and a doctor of music degree in 2003.

Salomaa made his professional singing debut in Helsinki at the age of 17 singing the part of Raphael in Joseph Haydn's The Creation. He has since had a highly active career as a concert soloist with major orchestras and ensembles in Europe, especially in Scandinavia. In 1984 he was the bass soloist in a nationally broadcast performance of Johann Sebastian Bach's St John Passion in Switzerland. He soon after appeared at Royal Albert Hall in London as the Levite in Handel's Solomon. He has also performed Gustav Mahler's Kindertotenlieder with the Orchestre de Paris.

In 1983 Salomaa made his professional opera debut at the Finnish National Opera (FNO) as Figaro in Wolfgang Amadeus Mozart's The Marriage of Figaro. In 1985 he made his debut at the Wexford Festival Opera as the King of Scotland in Handel's Ariodante. He had several major critical successes in performances of Mozart operas at the Drottningholm Palace Theatre in Stockholm, including performances of Leporello in Don Giovanni (1986), Figaro (1987), Nardo in La finta giardiniera (1988). In 1988 he made his debut at the Dutch National Opera as Masetto in Don Giovanni and Papageno in The Magic Flute. In 1989 he sang Figaro for his debuts at Theater Freiburg and the Michigan Opera Theater. He remained committed to Theater Freiburg through 1991 as a principal artist.

In 1995 Salomaa created the role of Prince Hatt in the world premiere of Erik Bergman's Det sjungande trädet at the FNO. He has since returned to the FNO multiple times, performing roles like the Captain in John Adams’ The Death of Klinghoffer and the title role in Don Giovanni. In 1996 he portrayed Silvio in Pagliacci at the Tampere Opera. In 2000 he performed the role of Saturn in the first modern revival of Giovanni Legrenzi's La divisione del mondo at the Schwetzingen Festival. He has also performed in Giuseppe Verdi's Don Carlos conducted by Herbert von Karajan at the Salzburg Festival, and has made appearances at the Deutsche Oper am Rhein, the Grand Théâtre de Genève, the Norwegian National Opera, the Prague State Opera, the Royal Opera, London, the Semperoper, the Teatro Lirico Giuseppe Verdi, and the Théâtre du Châtelet.
