= Akademen (disambiguation) =

Akademen is a Finland-Swedish colloquial name for at least two separate organizations:

- The Academic Male Voice Choir of Helsinki (Swedish: Akademiska Sångföreningen), a Finland-Swedish choir in Helsinki
- The Academic Bookstore (Swedish: Akademiska Bokhandeln, Finnish: Akateeminen Kirjakauppa), a Finnish bookstore chain, previously owned by Stockmann, since 2015 owned by Bonnier Books

== See also ==
- The Swedish Academy (Swedish: Svenska Akademien)
