= Akademiska Damkören Lyran =

Finland-Swedish academic female-voice choir

The Academic Female Voice Choir Lyran Akademiska Damkören Lyran
- Choir
- Emblem
- Origin: Helsinki, Finland
- Founded: 1946; 80 years ago
- Founder: Eja Tollet née Sevelius
- Genre: Choral (female voice)
- Members: Ca 50 active
- Chief conductor: Riku Laurikka
- Choir admission: Annual auditions
- Headquarters: Helsinki, Finland
- Affiliation: University of Helsinki
- Associated groups: The Academic Male Voice Choir of Helsinki; The YL Male Voice Choir; The Helsinki University Symphony Orchestra
- Website: lyran-rf.com

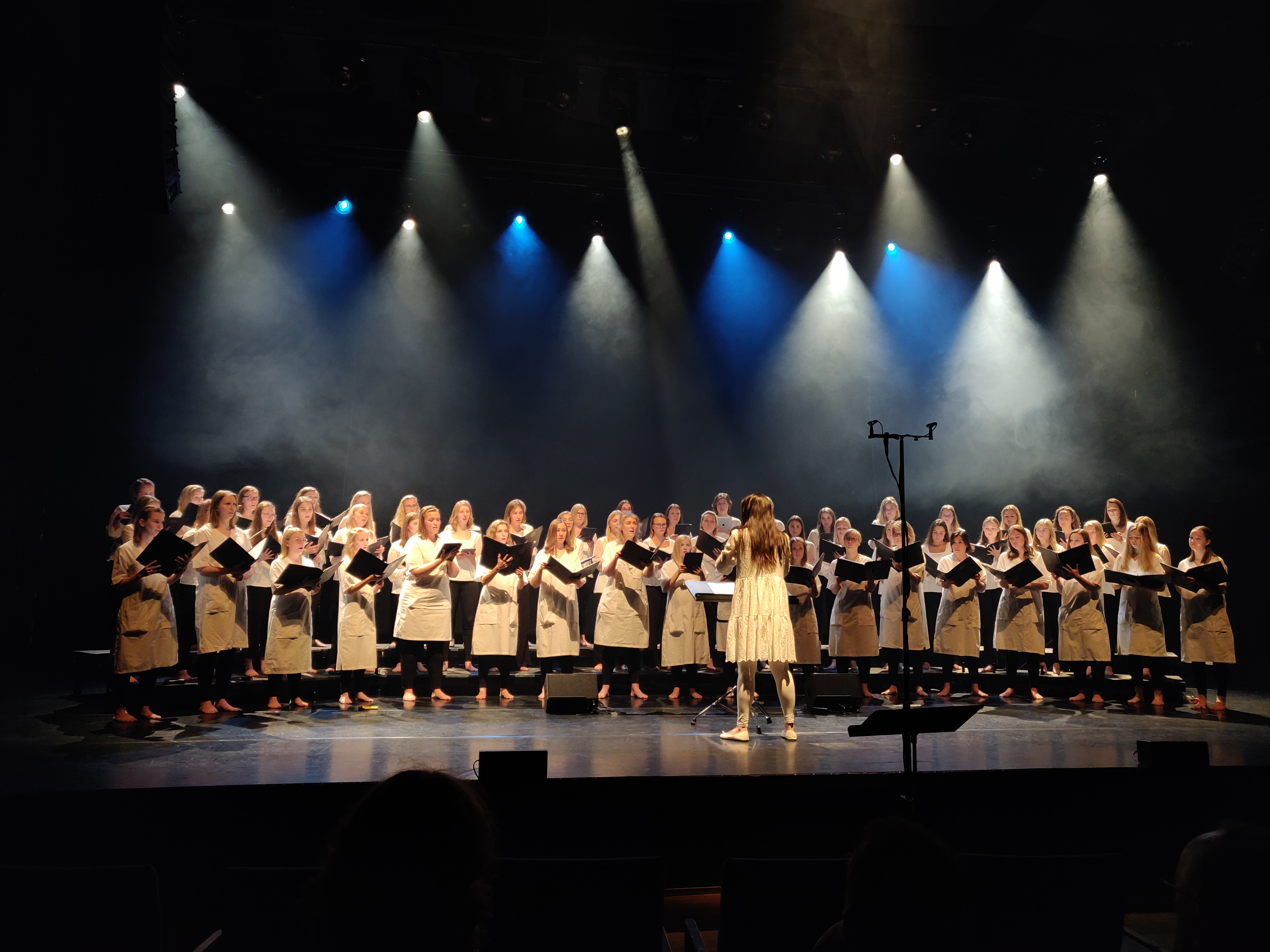
Akademiska Damkören Lyran 2019.

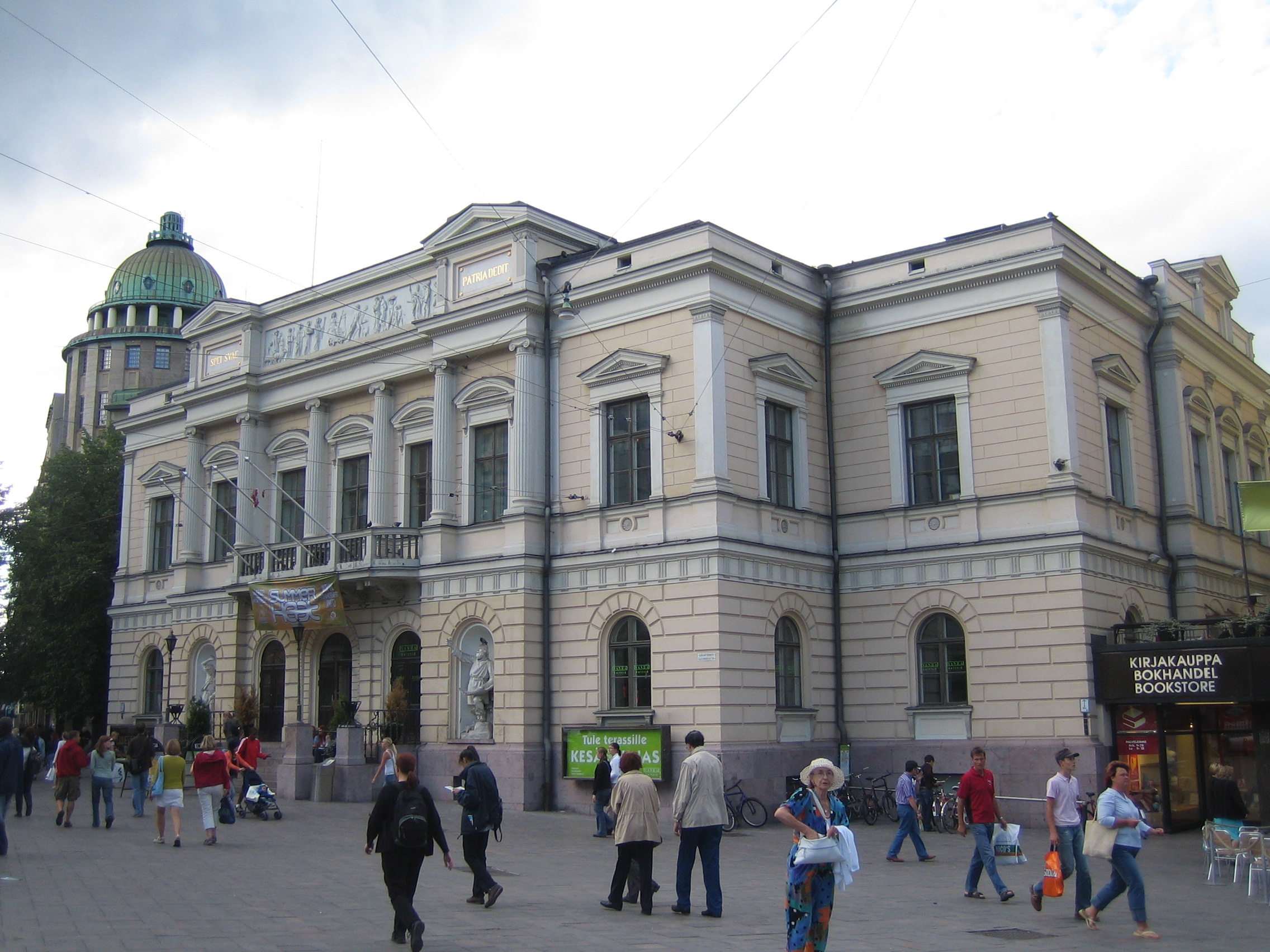
The Old Student House in Helsinki, where the choir rehearsed throughout most of the 20th century and as of 2016 rehearses every other semester

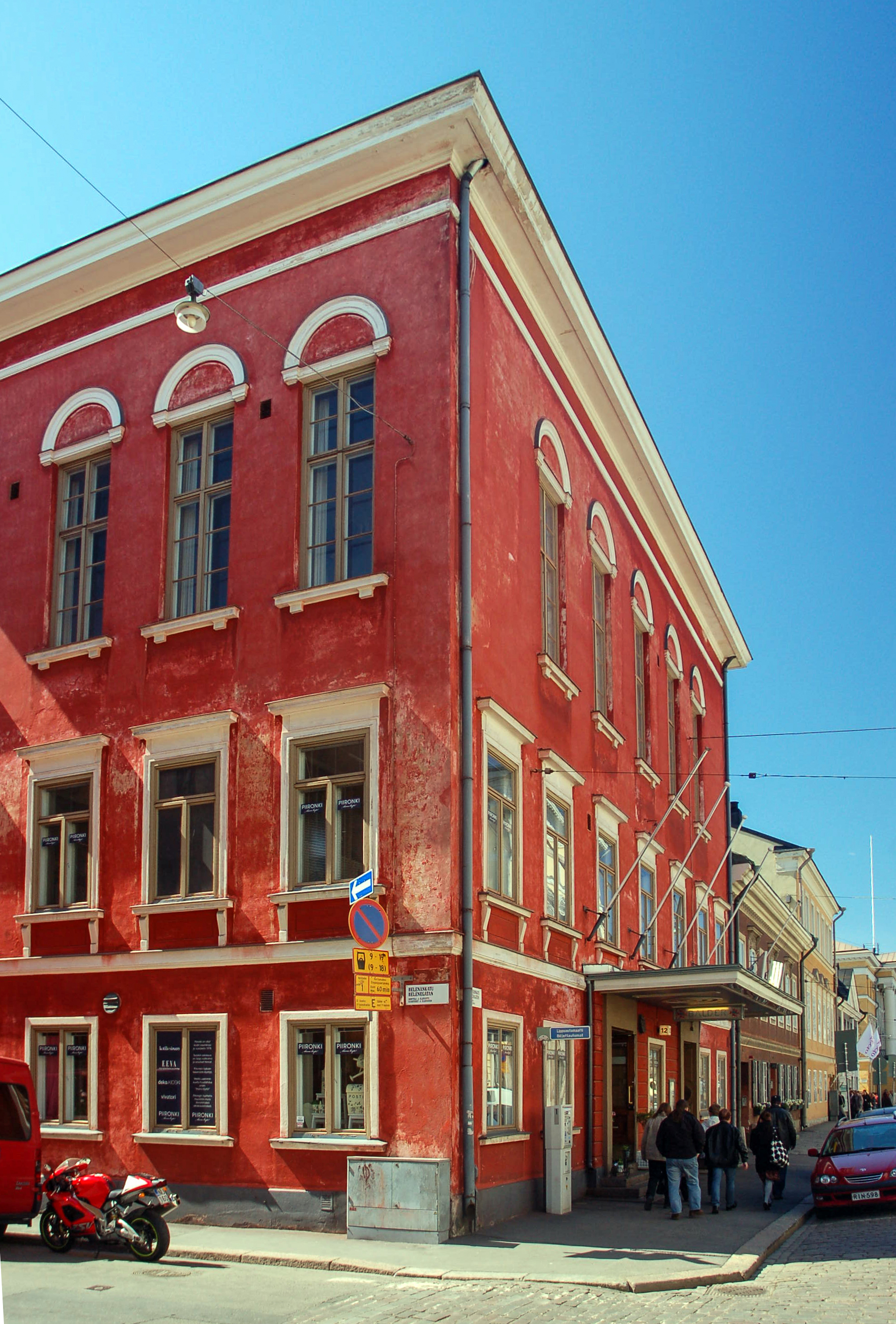
The Balder House in Helsinki, where the choir as of 2016 rehearses every other semester

The Academic Female Voice Choir Lyran (Swedish: Akademiska Damkören Lyran, lit. 'The Academic Women's Choir the Lyre', pronounced [ɑkɑˈdeːmiskɑ ˈdɑːmˌkœːren ˈlyːrɑn]), also referred to as simply Lyran, is a Finland-Swedish academic female voice choir in Helsinki, Finland. It is the only women's choir affiliated with the University of Helsinki.

== History ==
The choir was established in 1946 by a group of female students in Helsinki, led by Eja Tollet née Sevelius, who became the first artistic director of the choir. The choir was known as Gillekören Lyran (Note: Lit. 'The Guild Choir the Lyre') until 1948.

Present artistic director Riku Laurikka, MMus, began his tenure in the Spring term of 2023.

Ever since 1954, the choir has collaborated extensively with the Academic Male Voice Choir of Helsinki (Swedish: Akademiska Sångföreningen), the sole other Swedish-language University of Helsinki choir. The two choirs give several annually recurring concerts together.

Lyran has since 1968 kept a close relation to the Norwegian male choir Trondhjems Studentersangforening.

Chief conductors
From	To	Name	Notes
1946	1951	Eja Tollet née Sevelius	Founder
1951	1959	Henrik Christiernin	
1959	1972	Nils Holmqvist	
1972	1980	Lena von Bonsdorff	Appointed honorary conductor in 1987
1980	1981	Eric-Olof Söderström	
1981	1987	Lena von Bonsdorff	Appointed honorary conductor in 1987
1987	1998	Johanna Almark-Mannila née Almark	
1998	2009	Kari Turunen	
2009	2022	Jutta Seppinen	
2023		Riku Laurikka	Current

== Discography ==
Albums
Year	Title	Format	Notes
1971	Lyran 25 år	LP	
1978	Som ett eko	LP	
1985	Mikko Heiniö – Edith Södergran: Framtidens skugga – Landet som icke är	LP	
1986	Maid in Finland	LP	
1993	Bulgarisk skärgårdsvals	MC, CD	
1999	Julstämning	CD	Christmas album in collaboration with the Academic Male Voice Choir of Helsinki
2001	Lust	CD	
2004	I himmelen	CD	
2006	Pärlor	CD	
2007	Triumf	CD	
2011	Julen vi minns	CD	Christmas album in collaboration with the Academic Male Voice Choir of Helsinki
2016	Låt mig vara den jag är	CD	
2019	Hennes röst	CD	
