= SSSF =

SSSF may refer to:

- School Sisters of St. Francis - an education-oriented organization associated with nuns of the Catholic Church
- Stoosbahn - a funicular in Switzerland
- Swedish Shooting Sport Foundation, affiliated with the Swedish Home Guard
- Stockholm Academic Male Chorus (Swedish: Stockholms Studentsångarförbund)
