= Prince Hat Under the Ground =

Prince Hat under the Ground (Swedish: Prins Hatt under jorden) is the Swedish version of an old Scandinavian fairy tale. The Norwegian version is called East of the Sun and West of the Moon (Norwegian: Østenfor sol og vestenfor måne).

It was collected in Småland or Blekinge by Gunnar Olof Hyltén-Cavallius and George Stephens and published in Svenska folksagor och äfventyr (1:1-2, 1844-49). It has been filmed on several occasions and forms the basis of Erik Bergman's opera Det sjungande trädet.

It is of the Aarne-Thompson-Uther type 425A, "The Monster as Bridegroom", of the cycle about "the search for the lost husband". The themes of marriage to the monstrous or mysterious husband, of curiosity inspired by the mother, and even the drops of spilled tallow are very similar to the Hellenistic romance of Cupid and Psyche.

== Source ==
The tale was provided by Swedish author Sven Sederström from Blekinge. In his original version, the heroine is named Lina.

== Synopsis ==
A king has three daughters. One day, he wants to go to the fair, and promises to bring his daughters a present. After much insistence, the youngest asks for the "three singing leaves".

The king goes to the fair and has no luck in finding the requested item, until he wanders off and follows a melodious sound to a hazel-bush containing three golden leaves that produce sounds. The king approaches the hazel-bush to pluck the leaves, but a voice stops him, saying that the leaves belong to "Prince Hatt under the Earth".

The king makes a deal with the voice: he can take the leaves, but has to promise to deliver to Prince Hatt the first thing that greets the king on his returns. So he brings the leaves home and his youngest daughter welcomes him. Because of his rash promise, the king has to give his daughter to Prince Hatt.

The princess goes to Prince Hatt's lair and spends the days all alone in his subterranean abode, but when night falls, he returns and he is always tender and caring.

The problem is that she has promised him never to see his face. Three years pass and she has three children. She increasingly becomes less lonely and happier. Three years in a row, she visits her father's castle, when he remarries and her two sisters marry. However, the king's new consort makes her believe that she has to see her husband's face, because he might be a troll. At the third visit, her stepmother gives her a wax candle that she is to hold over her sleeping husband to see his face. To her happy surprise, she sees a beautiful young man, but a drop of wax falls onto his chest. He wakes up in horror, but now he is blind and the abode has turned into a hollow of toads and snakes.

The princess follows him on his wanderings, and she has to leave her children one by one. When she a second time fails to keep a promise, he disappears. After long searches, she is helped by three old women, who give her a golden spinning wheel, a golden reel for yarning, and a money-producing purse embroidered with golden silk. At last, the princess arrives at a castle, where a troll queen is preparing for marriage with Prince Hat.

Through bribing the troll queen with the golden objects, the princess gets to share the bed with her prince for three nights, but the troll queen has given him a potion so that he does not notice anything during these nights. It is not until the third night that he manages to stay awake and sees that his wife has found him. The spell is broken and they live happily ever after.

== Translations ==
The tale was translated into English with the title Prince Hatt under the Earth; or, The Three Singing Leaves, and by Benjamin Thorpe, in his compilation of Scandinavian fairy tales, as Prince Hatt under the Earth, or The Three Singing Leaves. The tale was also translated as Prince Hat Underground and as Prince Hat Beneath the Earth.

The tale was also translated to German as Prinz Hut unter der Erde.

== Analysis ==
=== Tale type ===
The tale is classified in the international Aarne-Thompson-Uther Index as type ATU 425A, "The Animal as Bridegroom". in this tale type, the heroine is a human maiden who marries a prince that is cursed to become an animal of some sort. She betrays his trust and he disappears, prompting a quest for him.

=== Motifs ===
The motif of the separation of the heroine from her children is located by scholarship across Celtic and Germanic speaking areas.

According to Hans-Jörg Uther, the main feature of tale type ATU 425A is "bribing the false bride for three nights with the husband". In fact, when he developed his revision of Aarne-Thompson's system, Uther remarked that an "essential" trait of the tale type ATU 425A was the "wife's quest and gifts" and "nights bought".

As part of the journey to her husband, the heroine may be helped by three old crones - a motif that appears in European variants.

== Variants ==
In a Swedish variant titled Hvitebjørn i skogen går or Vitebjörn i skogen går ("A Whitebear walks in the forest"), collected by August Bondeson, a princess finds a louse on her. She then decides to fatten it until it grows large, kills it and uses its hide as part of a riddle for anyone (tale type AaTh 621, "The Louseskin"). Many men fail in guessing it right, until a snake comes to the palace and wins the princess's challenge. The princess is forced, by her own word, to be given to the snake as its bride, and goes with the animal to its castle. Whatever the snake is, it comes to her bed at night. They live like this for three years, during which the princess gives birth to three sons, but which are taken from her by a spotted sow each time. One day, the princess sends her father a letter about her situation, and the king tells her to take a flint and light a candle at night. She lights a candle at night and sees beside her a handsome prince on her bed. She puts out the candle, but light it again to gaze at him one more time. This time, however, a drop falls on his face, and he wakes. Hurt at the princess's betrayal, he tells her he has been cursed by a witch, and they must part now, but before that, he will take the princess to where the children are. In snake form, the man takes the princess to three cottages, where the sow is guarding each of their sons. In each cottage, the princess is given a coloured silk ribbon by one of her sons (a blue one, a green one, and a red one). Finally, the snake takes the princess to a steep mountain, where he leaves the princess and slithers up it. The princess ties the thread around the snake form of her husband and climbs it with him. The snake leaves her and enters a castle, where he becomes a man, and is forced to marry the witch that cursed him. Meanwhile, the princess enters the castle and asks to be at the king's quarters. She is allowed in, but must remain silent. She disobeys the ban, and talks to her husband. They plot together to destroy the witch: the princess asks the witch to gaze at the rising sun. She does and bursts apart.

In a Finnish-Swedish tale collected by G. A. Åberg from Degerby with the title Prins Lopandiorm ("Prince Running Snake"), a princess finds a louse in her father's hair. The king has an idea: he fattens it and uses it leather as part of a riddle for his daughter's suitors. A snake ("orm") comes to the castle and guesses it right, claiming the princess as his wife. The orm takes the princess to a cave, where she lives in a room. The orm becomes a man by night and a snake by day. The princess becomes pregnant and gives birth to two children - each time her room rising above ground. When she is expecting a third child, she visits her family and is given a tinderbox to spy on her husband at night. She gives birth to her third child. One night, she lights the tinderbox and sees her husband's human form. The man awakes and laments that they have to part now. The princess's room sinks underground and she leaves on a journey. She meets three long-nosed women in three huts - each woman taking care of one of her children. The princess is given a magic tablecloth by the first woman, a magic needle by the second, and a magic pair of scissors by the third. Continuing on her journey, she overhears two ravens talking to each other about Prince Lopandiorm bring held prisoner by a witch in a castle somewhere. The princess finally reaches the witch's castle and uses the tablecloth, the needle and the scissors to bribe the witch for three nights with her husband.
