= Jutta Seppinen =

Finnish conductor and singer

- Born: 1976 (age 49–50); Helsinki, Finland
- Genres: Classical
- Occupations: Orchestral conductor; choral conductor; mezzo-soprano
- Member of: The Academic Female Voice Choir Lyran
- Website: juttaseppinen.com

Jutta Seppinen MMus (Finnish pronunciation: [ˈjutːɑ ˈsepːinen]; born 1976) is a Finnish conductor and mezzo-soprano.

== Life and career ==
=== Early life ===
Seppinen was born in Helsinki in 1976. She spent part of her early childhood in Paris. She began her musical studies at the age of seven, playing the violin at a Helsinki music school. At around the same time, she began singing in a choir, which became an important childhood hobby. She switched instruments to the piano at the age of 14, and some time later took up singing as her main instrument.

=== Education ===
Seppinen attended the programme in composition and music theory at the Sibelius Academy (since 2013 part of the University of the Arts Helsinki), studying music theory, classical singing, and choral conducting with Professor Matti Hyökki and Timo Nuoranne. Her thesis, written in 2005, analyses the interpretation of Desdemona in the operas Otello by Verdi and Otello by Rossini. She received her Diploma in classical singing with excellent grades in 2007 and graduated as Master of Music in 2008.

After her graduation, Seppinen took part in master classes with Anne Le Bozec and Riikka Hakola, and studied with Peter Lindroos, Sauli Tiilikainen, and Malcolm Walkers. She also studied with Tatyana Chitrova in Saint Petersburg, and took part in orchestral conducting courses with Ennio Nicotra in Italy.

After some years with a career as a choral conductor and singer, Seppinen returned to the Sibelius Academy in 2011 for a second master's degree, studying orchestral conducting with Professor Leif Segerstam and Professor Atso Almila. Other conducting teachers have included Esa-Pekka Salonen, Osmo Vänskä, Jorma Panula, Mikko Franck, John Storgårds, and Herbert Blomstedt. She spent the spring semester of 2013 at the University of Music and Theatre Leipzig (German: Hochschule für Musik und Theater "Felix Mendelssohn Bartholdy" Leipzig), studying orchestral conducting with Professor Ulrich Windfuhr.

In 2014, Seppinen was selected for the Finnish National Opera's KapuApu programme for Sibelius Academy conducting students, being mentored in opera production and conducting by chief conductor Michael Güttler.

Seppinen held her orchestral conducting Diploma concert in October 2016, conducting the Sibelius Academy Symphony Orchestra at the Helsinki Music Centre, thus completing her conducting studies.

Seppinen's long-time private vocal teacher is Finnish opera singer and mezzo-soprano Eeva-Liisa Saarinen.

=== Professional career ===
For a brief period in 2003, succeeding Mia Makaroff, Seppinen directed the Helsinki-based female voice choir Evivakören. She was succeeded by Michaela Ijäs née Johansson. From 2004 to 2005, she directed the girls' choir Serenakören. She was succeeded by Nina Kronlund.

In 2005, Seppinen was appointed artistic director of the Helsinki-based academic mixed voice choir Wiipurilaisen Osakunnan Laulajat, also known as WiOL. She stepped down in 2011, having directed the choir for six years.

In 2009, having received her first MMus degree a year prior, Seppinen was appointed artistic director of the Academic Female Voice Choir Lyran (Swedish: Akademiska Damkören Lyran), the only female voice choir affiliated with the University of Helsinki, succeeding Kari Turunen. Under her leadership, the choir has expanded its stylistic width and its repertoire into new genres.

Seppinen has also worked with choirs Viva Vox, Chorus Sanctæ Ceciliæ, and Dominante.

In the course of her studies and various master classes, Seppinen has conducted several Finnish orchestras, among these the Lapland Chamber Orchestra, the Ostrobothnian Chamber Orchestra, the Tapiola Sinfonietta, the Joensuu City Orchestra, the Kuopio Symphony Orchestra, as well as the Leipzig Symphony Orchestra, the Musikalische Komödie of the Leipzig Opera, and the St Thomas Choir of Leipzig (German: Thomanerchor).

In 2014, Seppinen conducted the Sibelius Academy's production of the opera Così fan tutte by Wolfgang Amadeus Mozart, and in 2015 she conducted the Academic Female Voice Choir Lyran's, the Academic Male Voice Choir of Helsinki's, and the Helsinki Baroque Orchestra's production of the Mass in B minor by Johann Sebastian Bach.

As a mezzo-soprano, Seppinen has given solo concerts, been part of opera productions, and performed in contemporary music festivals, both in Finland and abroad. She has premiered several vocal works written specifically for her, for example by Heinz-Juhani Hofmann.

== Accolades ==
In 2002, Seppinen finished second in the VocalEspoo (previously known as KuoroEspoo) choral conducting competition. In 2006, she was selected for the international Eric Ericson Award competition for young choral conductors.

Conducting the Academic Female Voice Choir Lyran at the 30th Praga Cantat International Choir Competition in Prague in October 2016, Seppinen received the Miroslav Košler Special Prize for outstanding conducting performance.

== Personal life ==
Seppinen lives in Helsinki with her family.

Cultural offices
Preceded by Kari Turunen	Chief Conductor, The Academic Female Voice Choir Lyran; 2009–2022	Incumbent
