= Kari Turunen =

Dr Kari Turunen
- Born: Kari Antero Turunen; 5 September 1962 (age 63); Joensuu, Finland
- Genres: Choral; classical; early; sacred
- Occupations: Artistic director; choral conductor; ensemble tenor; scholar; lecturer; administrator
- Years active: c. 1990 – present
- Website: kariturunen.com

Kari Antero Turunen DMus (Finnish pronunciation: [ˈkɑri ˈturunen]; born 5 September 1962), is a Finnish artistic director, choral conductor, ensemble tenor, and music scholar and lecturer.

== Life and career ==
=== Early life ===
Turunen was born in September 1962 in Joensuu in Eastern Finland. He spent part of his childhood in Australia.

In his youth, Turunen played the double bass.

=== Education and academic career ===
Turunen attended the programme in orchestral and choral conducting at the Sibelius Academy in Helsinki, studying choral conducting with Professor Matti Hyökki. He received his Diploma in choral conducting in 1998, and graduated as Master of Music in 2000. In his thesis, Turunen analyzes the oratorio Jephtha by Handel. Turunen also attended the University of Helsinki.

Around this time, Turunen also studied with or took part in master classes with musicians such as Stefan Sköld, Anders Eby, Eric Ericson, Oren Brown, and the Hilliard Ensemble.

Turunen later returned to academia, receiving his Doctor of Music degree in 2014 at the DocMus Doctoral School of the Sibelius Academy's Faculty of Classical Music, by then part of the University of the Arts Helsinki, with a dissertation on early music performance practice and specifically Giovanni Pierluigi da Palestrina, titled Performing Palestrina: From historical evidence to twenty-first century performance. As part of his doctoral degree, Turunen formed and directed the Ensemble Petraloysio, an all-male ensemble comprising vocalists, an organist, and various other instrumentalists as needed, performing sacred works by Palestrina.

=== Professional career ===
==== 1990–2000 ====
In 1990, Turunen was hired as executive director of The Finnish Amateur Musicians' Association Sulasol (Finnish: Suomen Laulajain ja Soittajain Liitto). He stepped down in 1996.

Also in 1990, early in his career as a choral conductor, Turunen was appointed artistic director of the Chamber Choir EOL (Finnish: Eteläsuomalaisen Osakunnan Laulajat), a mixed voice choir affiliated with the University of Helsinki student nation Eteläsuomalainen osakunta. He would direct the choir for twelve years, stepping down in 2002.

In 1993, Turunen was one of the founding members of Lumen Valo, an eight-member mixed voice vocal ensemble performing classical and especially early music. He has, as of 2019, been one of the ensemble's tenors ever since. The ensemble has come to be a prominent one on the Finnish early vocal music scene.

In 1998, Turunen was appointed artistic director of the Academic Female Voice Choir Lyran (Swedish: Akademiska Damkören Lyran), the only female voice choir affiliated with the University of Helsinki, succeeding Johanna Almark-Mannila (née Almark). He directed the choir for eleven years, stepping down in 2009, having been appointed artistic director of the Academic Male Voice Choir of Helsinki (Swedish: Akademiska Sångföreningen) a year prior. He was succeeded by Jutta Seppinen.

==== 2001–2019 ====
Between 2001 and 2011, Turunen was lecturer of choral conducting at the Pirkanmaa University of Applied Sciences (Finnish: Pirkanmaan ammattikorkeakoulu) in Tampere, later merged with the Tampere University of Applied Sciences (Finnish: Tampereen ammattikorkeakoulu). A year after the beginning of his tenure, in 2002, Turunen was appointed artistic director of the Tampere-based mixed voice choir Näsin Ääni, later known as Kamarikuoro Näsi. No longer working as a lecturer in Tampere, he stepped down in 2012.

Turunen succeeded Henrik Wikström as artistic director of Finland's oldest extant choir, the Academic Male Voice Choir of Helsinki (Swedish: Akademiska Sångföreningen), one of two male voice choirs affiliated with the University of Helsinki, in 2008.

In 2011, Turunen not only formed the Ensemble Petraloysio, but was also appointed artistic director of the Helsinki-based mixed voice Kampin Laulu Chamber Choir, as well as the Chorus Cantorum Finlandiæ (Finnish: Suomen kanttorikuoro), a choir comprising Finnish church musicians, originally exclusively performing male voice sacred music, but later including female voices and performing mixed voice sacred music.

In 2013, the mixed voice choir Spira Ensemble was formed in Helsinki, appointing Turunen its first artistic director.

Turunen is artistic director of the annual Aurore Renaissance Music Festival in Helsinki, which was arranged for the first time in 2014.

Turunen is a part-time teacher at the DocMus Doctoral School at the Sibelius Academy's Faculty of Classical Music.

In addition to his other commitments, Turunen has been an active writer and journalist in the field of music. He also appears regularly as choral teacher and adjudicator.

==== 2019 appointment as conductor of the Vancouver Chamber Choir ====
In March 2019, it was announced that Turunen had been appointed the new conductor and artistic director of the Vancouver Chamber Choir, beginning in September 2019, succeeding founder and long-time conductor and artistic director Jon Washburn.

=== Positions of trust ===
Turunen was chairman of the Finnish Choral Directors' Association (Finnish: Suomen kuoronjohtajayhdistys) from 1997 until 2018.

== Accolades ==
In Marktoberdorf in 2003, conducting the Academic Female Voice Choir Lyran, Turunen received the Pro Musica Viva–Maria Strecker-Daelen award for the best conducting performance interpreting a contemporary choral work.

Turunen was named choral conductor of the year by the Finnish Choral Directors' Association in 2008.

Turunen has been appointed honorary conductor by both the Academic Female Voice Choir Lyran and the Academic Male Voice Choir of Helsinki.

== Personal life ==
Turunen is married and lives with his family in Kerava outside Helsinki. He enjoys English literature and is an avid cricket player; he has held positions of trust in his home club Kerava CC as well as in the Finnish Cricket Association.

Turunen's native language is Finnish, but he is also fluent in Swedish, several of his choirs belonging to Finland's Swedish-language minority, in addition to being fluent in English.

== Citations ==
Awards
Preceded by Kari Pappinen	Finnish Choral Directors' Association Choral Conductor of the Year; 2008	Succeeded by Timo Lehtovaara
Cultural offices
Preceded by Johanna Almark-Mannila née Almark	Chief Conductor, The Academic Female Voice Choir Lyran; 1998–2009	Succeeded by Jutta Seppinen
Preceded by Henrik Wikström	Chief Conductor, The Academic Male Voice Choir of Helsinki; 2008–2019	Succeeded by Elisa Huovinen
