= Kullervo Sets Off for War =

Painting by Akseli Gallen-Kallela

- Kullervon sotaanlähtö (Finnish)
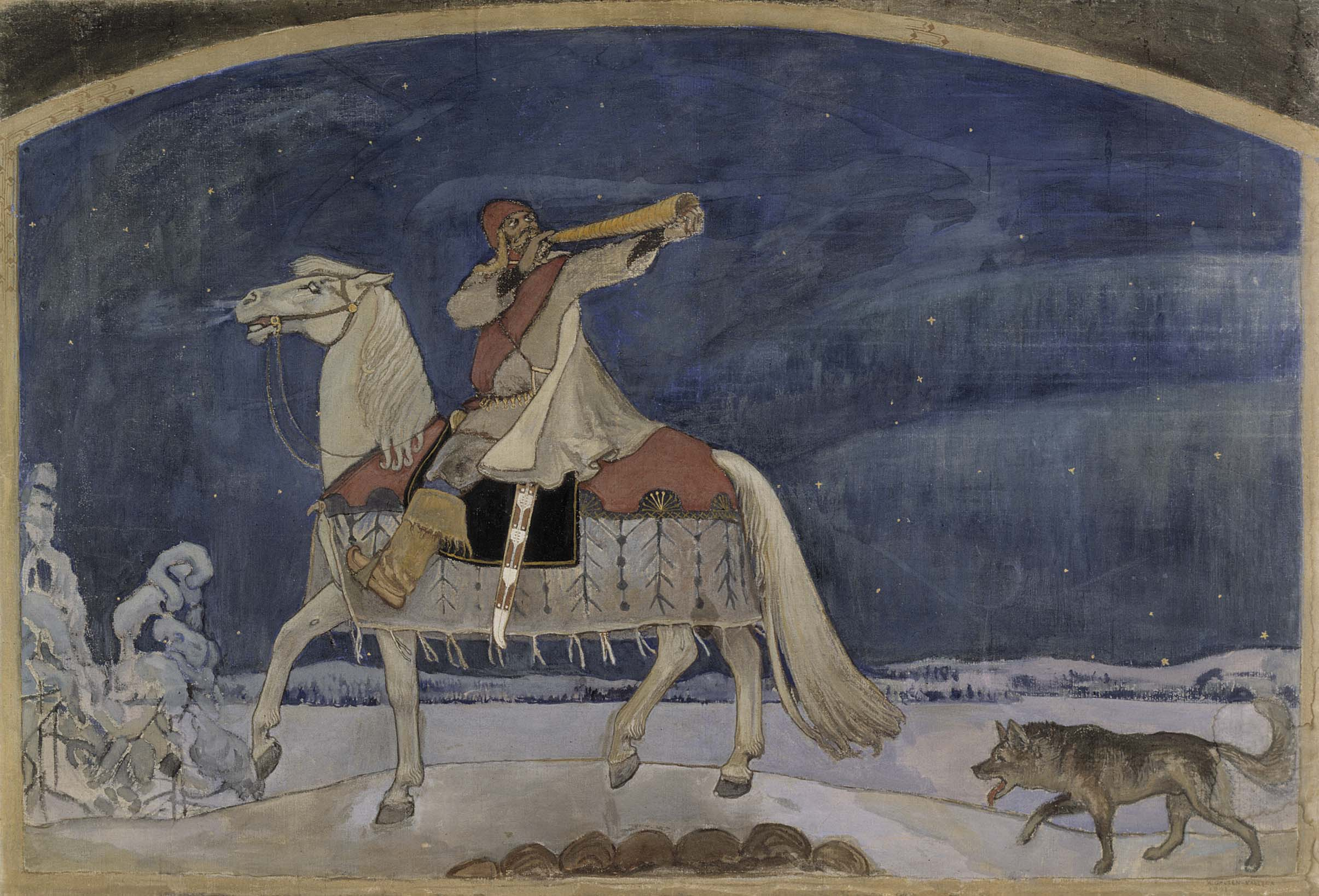
- Gallen-Kallela's tempera version from 1901.
- Artist: Akseli Gallen-Kallela
- Year: 1901
- Medium: Mural & Tempera
- Dimensions: 355 cm x 687 cm (mural); 89 cm x 128 cm (tempera)
- Location: Mural: Old Student House Tempera: Ateneum, Helsinki

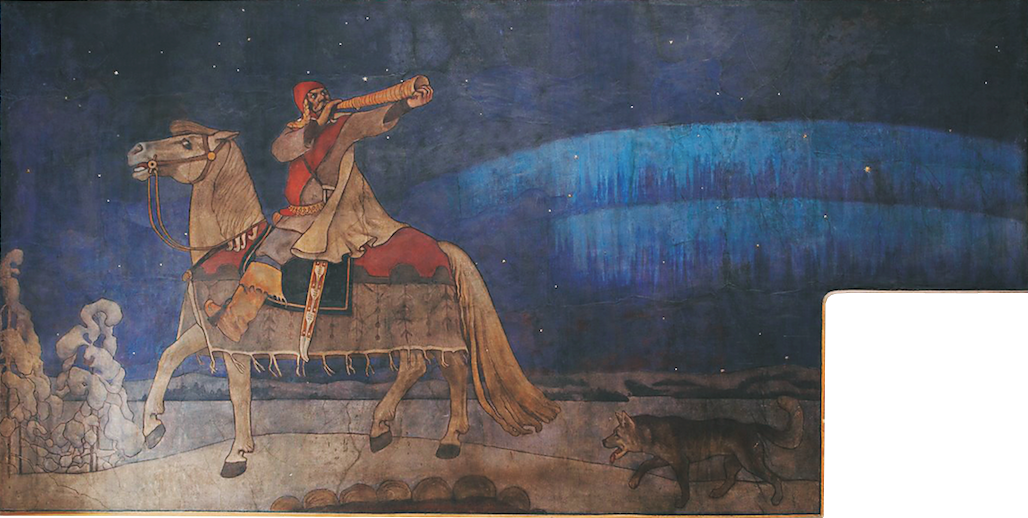
The fresco at Old Student House

Kullervo Sets Off for War (Finnish: Kullervon sotaanlähtö) is a painting by Akseli Gallen-Kallela from the year 1901. He painted the subject in tempera painting (89 × 128 cm) and as a fresco (355 × 687 cm) which is located in the music hall of Old Student House of Helsinki University.

== Description ==
The fresco was donated to the Students' union by Otto Donner.

The theme for the painting is from the Kalevala, national epic of Finland. Kullervo sits on a white horse ready to ride to war, to take revenge on his uncle Untamo. He is followed by a dog or a wolf.

Gallen-Kallela traveled to Siena, Italy, where he likely saw the frescoes by Simone Martini in the Palazzo Pubblico. Martini's Equestrian portrait probably gave Gallen-Kallela inspiration for the setting of Kullervo.

== Gallery ==
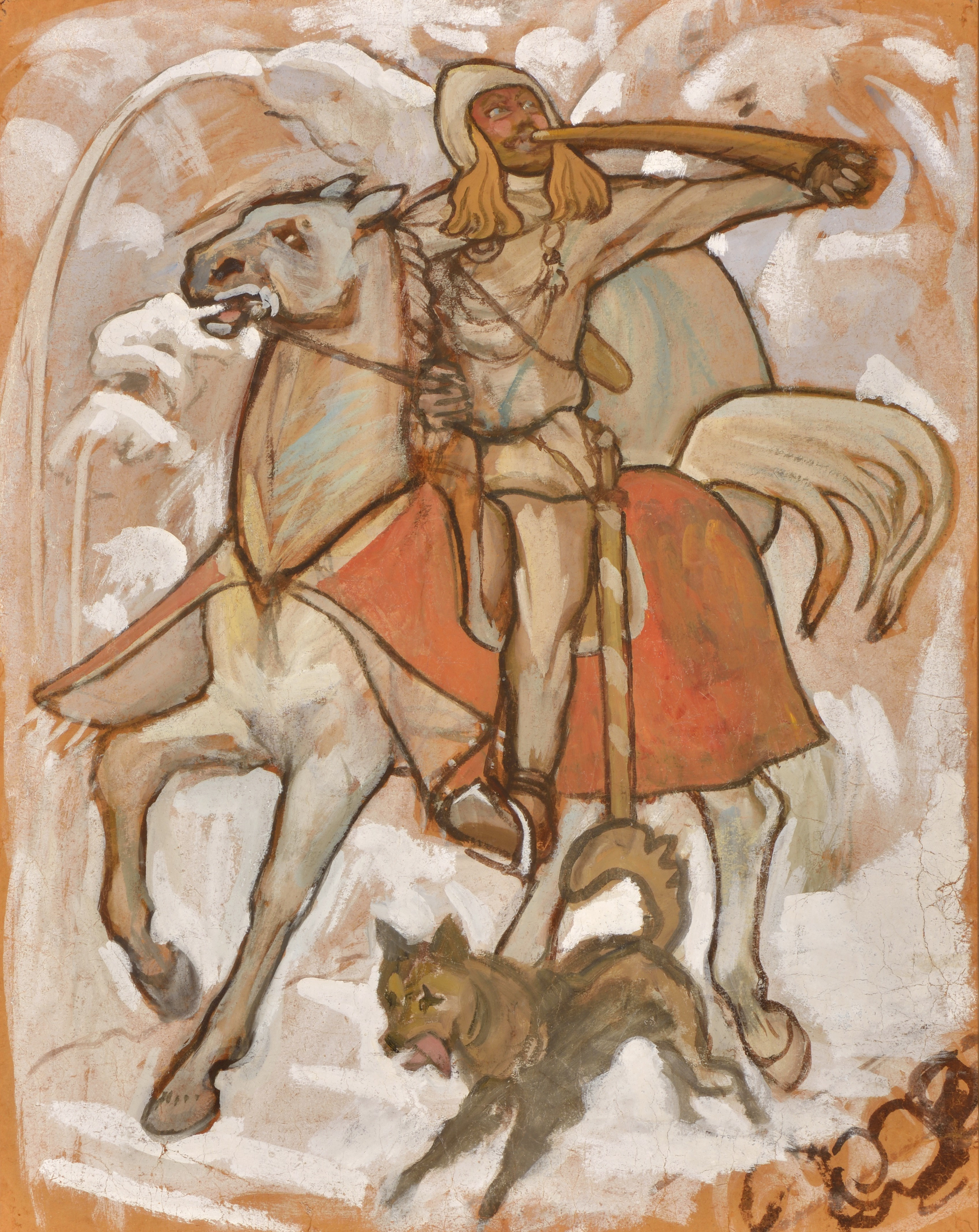
1897 sketch of the work by Gallen-Kallela

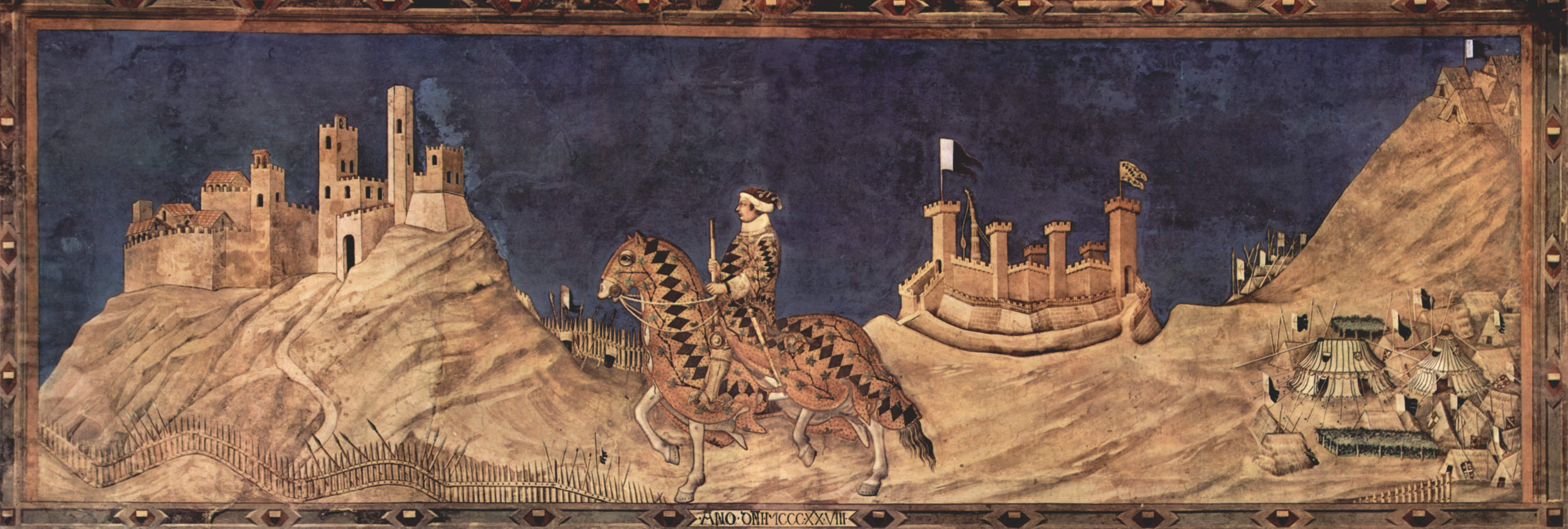
Simone Martini, Equestrian portrait of Guidoriccio da Fogliano, c. 1330

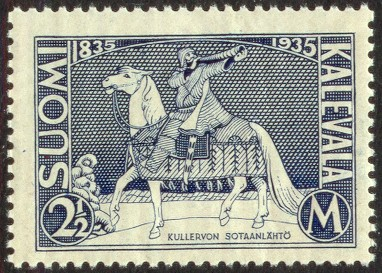
1935 Finnish postage stamp featuring the painting
