= Det sjungande trädet (opera) =

1995 opera by Erik Bergman

- Opera by Erik Bergman
- 1905 illustration from Prins Hatt under jorden, the Swedish fairy tale on which the opera is based
- Librettist: Bo Carpelan
- Language: Swedish
- Premiere: 3 September 1995; Helsinki Opera House

Det sjungande trädet (The Singing Tree), Op. 110, is an opera in two acts by the Finnish composer Erik Bergman. The Swedish-language libretto, based on a Swedish fairy tale, was written by Bo Carpelan. The opera premiered on 3 September 1995 at the Helsinki Opera House.

== Background and performance history ==
Det sjungande trädet was Bergman's only full-length opera and was composed between 1986 and 1988 as a commission from the Finnish National Opera. Prior to that, the closest he had come to the operatic genre was his 1971 Samothrake Op. 69, a 12-minute "musico-dramatic tableau" for speaker, mixed choir, and dancers. Carpelan's libretto is primarily based on the Swedish fairy tale, Prins Hatt under jorden (Prince Hatt under the Ground) which was in turn based on the ancient myth of Cupid and Psyche, but it also incorporates other elements from Swedish and Finnish folk tales.

The opera had been originally commissioned for the opening season of the new Helsinki Opera House in 1993/94, but the complex structure of the work with 22 separate scenes, each with its own lighting and other technical requirements, led to a postponement of the premiere. However, it was recorded in 1992 at Finlandia Hall conducted by Ulf Söderblom and released on the Ondine label later that year. Bergman was awarded the 1994 Nordic Council Music Prize for Det sjungande trädet, and it received its first staged performance on 3 September 1995 at the Helsinki Opera House as part of the Helsinki Festival, again conducted by Söderblom. It was performed again in 1999 at the Deutsche Oper Berlin in a touring production by the Finnish National Opera.

== Roles ==
Roles, voice types, premier cast
Role	Voice type	Premiere cast, 3 September 1995 (Conductor: Ulf Söderblom)
The Princess	soprano	Kaisa Hannula
Prince Hatt	bass-baritone	Petteri Salomaa
The King	tenor	Peter Lindroos
The Witch	mezzo-soprano	Charlotta Hellekant
The Fool	baritone	Sauli Tiilikainen
Fruit seller	bass	Antti Suhonen
Servants, off-stage voices, chorus

== Synopsis ==
The opera's two acts are structured in a sequence of 22 tableaux with a prologue, interlude, and epilogue. They recount the story of Prince Hatt, who has been imprisoned underground by his aunt, the Witch, and is rescued by an unnamed Princess. The Princess first communicates with Prince Hatt by singing "The Tree of Life", which they both hear in their dreams. The Witch is ultimately destroyed by "the power of light" and the couple are united. However, the ending is not a completely happy one. The Princess is struck blind by the dying curse of the Witch.
