= Vancouver Chamber Choir =

Canadian choir

- Vancouver Chamber Choir Logo

Background information
- Origin: Vancouver, British Columbia, Canada
- Genres: Choral music
- Occupation: Chamber choir
- Years active: 1971–present
- Members: Conductor; Kari Turunen
- Website: vancouverchamberchoir.com

The Vancouver Chamber Choir is a Canadian choir performing in Vancouver, British Columbia. It was founded in 1971 by Jon Washburn. The VCC has commissioned and premiered more than 170 new choral works in over four decades. The choir performs at home and abroad and has received many honours and distinctions from around the world. The choir has toured throughout North America as well as Asia and Europe.

== History and Artistic Directors ==
Jon Washburn served as the conductor and Artistic Director of the Vancouver Chamber Choir from its inception until 2019. During his time with the Vancouver Chamber Choir, he was awarded the Order of Canada, as well as Queen Elizabeth II Silver, Golden, and Jubilee Medals.

In March 2019, Kari Turunen was appointed as the new conductor, beginning in September 2019.

On June 28, 2019, flooding destroyed the choir's library of music which was held at their office at Hodson Manor in Vancouver.
