= Peter Lindroos =

Finnish opera singer

- Born: 26 February 1944; Pohja, Finland
- Died: 17 November 2003 (aged 59); Tjörnarp, Skåne, Sweden
- Known for: Opera singer (tenor)

Paul Peter Christer Lindroos (26 February 1944 – 17 November 2003) was a Finnish opera singer who appeared in leading tenor roles throughout Europe but was particularly associated with the Finnish National Opera and the Royal Danish Opera. Although he specialised in the 19th-century Italian spinto repertoire, he also sang in many 20th-century works and created the role of The King in Erik Bergman's Det sjungande trädet in 1995. In his later years he was a professor of voice at the Sibelius Academy in Helsinki and the Malmö Academy of Music in Sweden. He died along with his young son in a car accident near Malmö at the age of 59. He is buried in Pohja, Finland, the town of his birth.

== Life and career ==
Lindroos was born to a musical family in Pohja, a village in the Swedish-speaking region of Finland. His father Bertel was the organist in Pohja's Swedish-language Lutheran Church and his mother Hjördis a singer in the church choir and local concerts. He initially studied to be a church cantor and organist at the Sibelius Academy and in his early years worked as a cantor. After completing his studies at the Sibelius Academy in 1964 he studied privately in Helsinki with the soprano Jolanda di Maria Petris who retrained his voice from bass-baritone to tenor. His tenor voice retained its baritonal timbre, and he would later specialise in the spinto repertoire. Radames in Aida, Manrico in Il trovatore, Cavaradossi in Tosca, Don José, in Carmen, Bacchus in Ariadne auf Naxos and the title role in Parsifal were amongst his best known roles.

Lindroos made his stage debut with the Finnish National Opera in 1967 as Rodolfo in La bohème. A two-year contract with the Gothenburg Opera followed in 1969. He was engaged by the Royal Danish Opera in 1971 and appeared regularly with that company as a leading soloist until 1985. In between his early engagements in Scandinavia, he continued his private vocal studies in Rome with Licinio Francardi and Luigi Ricci and in Treviso with Marcello Del Monaco (the brother of tenor Mario Del Monaco). His international career took off in the 1970s when he began appearing regularly at the Vienna State Opera and the opera companies of Munich and Hamburg as well as touring internationally with the Finnish National Opera. Amongst the other opera houses where he appeared were London's Royal Opera House (as the Duke of Mantua in Rigoletto and Bacchus in Ariadne auf Naxos), the Teatro Colón in Buenos Aires (as Don José in Carmen), and the Teatro Regio di Parma (as Don José).

In his later years, he taught singing at the Sibelius Academy and then at the Malmö Academy of Music at Lund University from 1995 to 2002. By the summer of 2003, he and his wife, the singer Gabriela Gaàland, and their young family had moved to Skåne in Sweden where he was planning to spend his retirement years as a cantor at the churches of Hästveda and Farstorp. On 17 November 2003, Lindroos was killed in a car accident near Malmö at the age of 59. His 18-month-old son Andreas was also killed in the accident, and his wife and four-year-old daughter were badly injured. Lindroos and his young son are buried in Pohja. His son from a previous marriage, Petri Lindroos (born 1966), is also an opera singer.

Lindroos was awarded Denmark's Order of the Dannebrog in 1979 and Finland's Order of the White Rose in 1983. He was also awarded with Beniamino Gigli Prize in 1994.

== Roles created ==
- Johann in Einojuhani Rautavaara's Thomas, Carelia-Halle, Joensuu, 21 June 1985
- Rattenfänger in Friedrich Cerha's Der Rattenfänger, Opernhaus Graz, 26 September 1987
- The King in Erik Bergman's Det sjungande trädet, Helsinki Opera House, 3 September 1995
