= Stockholm Academic Male Chorus =

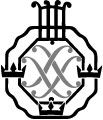
Stockholms Academic Male Chorus
CONDUCTORS
From	To	Name
1905	1914	Calle Gentzel
1914	1917	John Örtengren
1917	1967	Einar Ralf
1967	1981	Lars Blohm
1981	1984	Anders-Per Jonsson
1985	1989	Lars Blohm
1989	1997	Göte Widlund
1998	2008	Karin Oldgren
2008	2012	Jerica Bukovec
2012		Pelle Olofson

Stockholm Academic Male Chorus (Swedish: Stockholms Studentsångarförbund) is a Swedish amateur choir, which was founded in 1905. Today, the choir is one of Sweden's top male choirs.

The choir has produced many recordings. The CD Välkommen till våren made Audiophile Audition's Best Of The Year Discs list for 2003.
