= Helsinki University Symphony Orchestra =

The Helsinki University Symphony Orchestra (Finnish: Ylioppilaskunnan Soittajat, YS) is a symphony orchestra resident in Helsinki, Finland.

YS was founded in 1926. It is a full-sized symphony orchestra, and performs concerts and tours both at home in Finland and abroad and takes part in various academic festivities.

== History ==
The Ylioppilaskunnan Soittajat can trace its roots back to the year 1747, when the Akateeminen Kapelli (the Academic Capella) was founded at the Royal Academy of Turku. After the Great Fire of Turku in 1827, the university moved to Helsinki, taking the orchestra with it. From 1868 until 1926, the orchestra was run as a department of the University of Helsinki, under the name of Akadeeminen Orkesteri (the Academic Orchestra). In 1926, the Academic Orchestra gained its independence and became the Ylioppilaskunnan Soittajat.

== Conductors ==
A number of world-famous Finnish conductors started their careers as principal or assistant conductor of the Ylioppilaskunnan Soittajat, including Paavo Berglund, Okko Kamu and Susanna Mälkki.

Principal conductors of Ylioppilaskunnan Soittajat

| Conductor | Dates |
|---|---|
| Toivo Haapanen | 1926–1936 |
| Jussi Jalas | 1936–1946 |
| Erik Cronvall | 1946–1966 |
| Leif Segerstam | 1966–1967 |
| Kari Tikka | 1967–1972 |
| Ilpo Mansnerus | 1972–1974 |
| Ylermi Poijärvi | 1974–1976 |
| Alf Nybo | 1976–1979 |
| Esa-Pekka Salonen | 1979–1980 |
| Petri Sakari | 1980–1985 |
| Markus Lehtinen | autumn 1983, 1985–1988 |
| Tuomas Pirilä | 1988–1990 |
| Michael Adelson | 1990–1992 |
| John Storgårds | 1992–1996 |
| Tuomas Rousi | 1996–2001 |
| Jyri Nissilä | 2001–2003 |
| David Searle | 2003–2007 |
| Mikk Murdvee | 2007–2017 |
| Tomas Djupsjöbacka | 2017–2022 |
| Aku Sorensen | 2022–2026 |
| Mateusz Gwizdałła | 2026– |
