= Erik Bergman =

Finnish composer

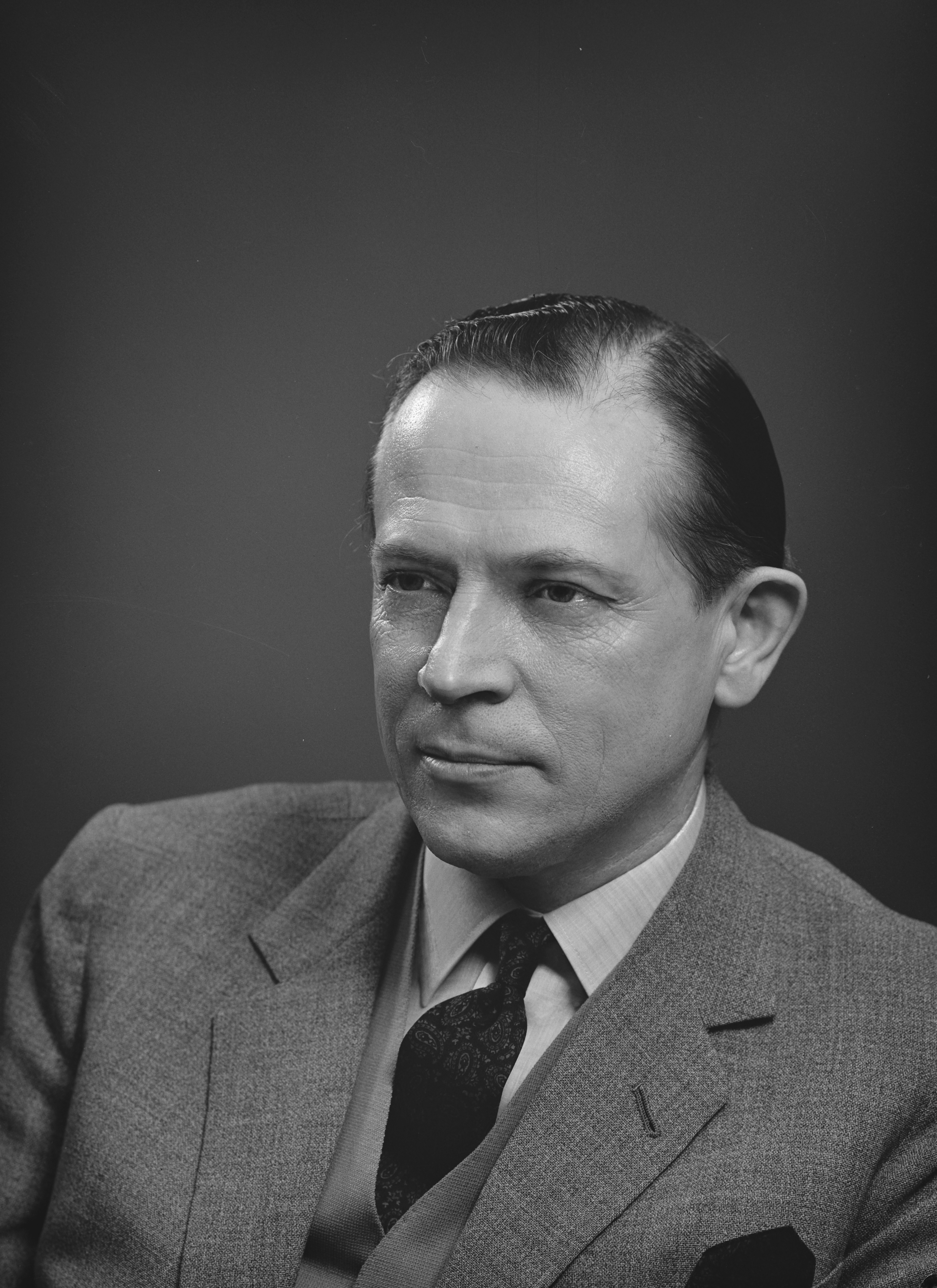
Finnish composer Erik Bergman in 1967.

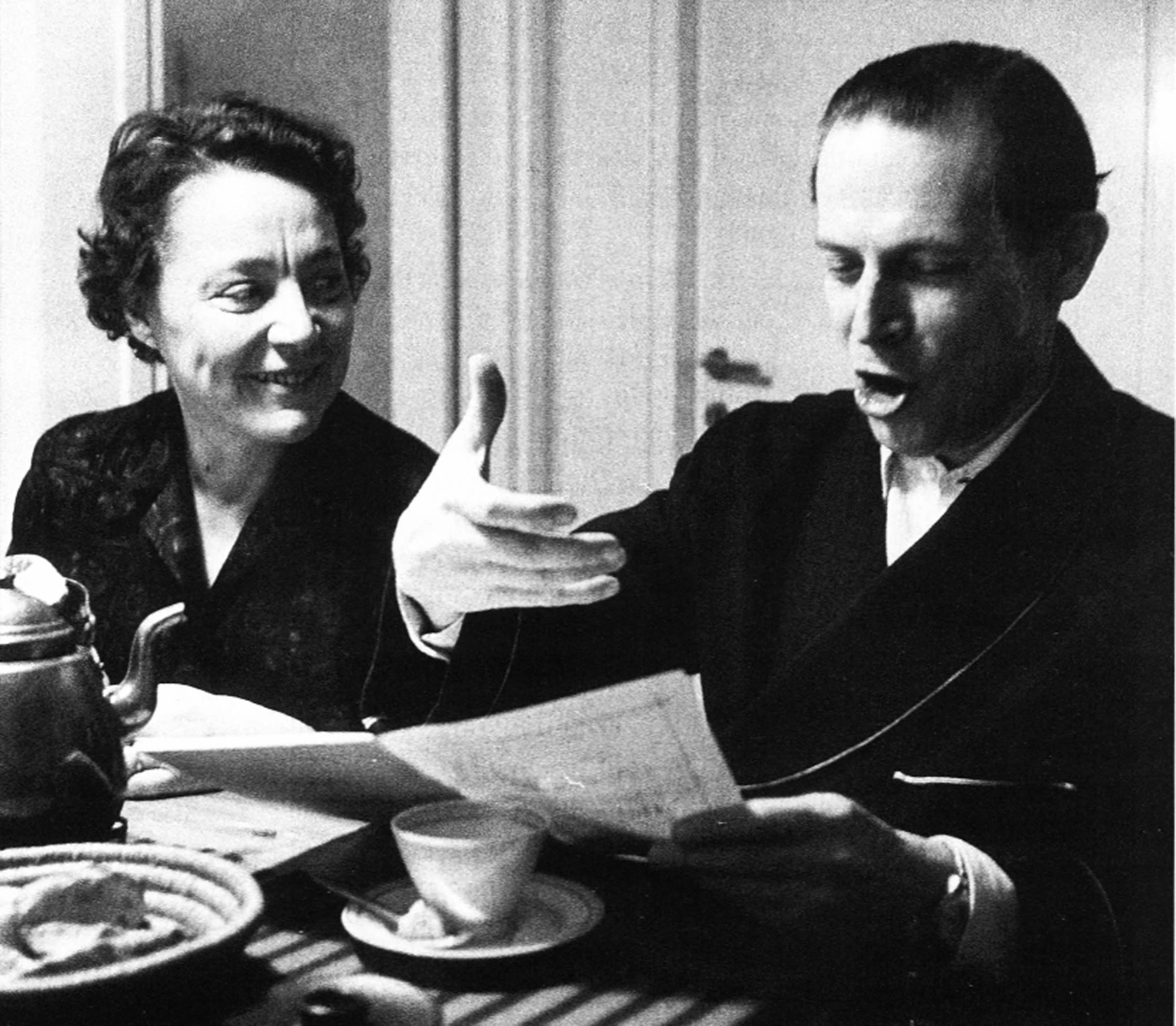
Erik Bergman and his third wife, the writer Solveig von Schoultz (1907–1996)

Erik Valdemar Bergman (24 November 1911 – 24 April 2006) was a composer of classical music from Finland.

Bergman's style ranged widely, from Romanticism in his early works (many of which he later prohibited from being performed) to modernism and primitivism, among other genres. He won the Nordic Council Music Prize in 1994 for his opera Det sjungande trädet.

== Biography ==
Bergman was born in Nykarleby. He studied at the Sibelius Academy in Helsinki and afterwards with Heinz Tiessen in Berlin and with Wladimir Vogel in Ascona. Since 1963 he taught composition at the Sibelius Academy, besides working until 1978 as a choir conductor. Bergman is considered a pioneer of modern music in Finland. Because of his training he was considered as a representative of the avant-garde; he developed for example the twelve-tone techniques of Arnold Schoenberg learned from Wladimir Vogel. He composed song cycles, cantatas, pieces for piano and for organ, a guitar suite, a chamber concert for flute, clarinet, bass clarinet, violin, viola, cello, percussion and piano and further chamber works. His Requiem for a dead poet (1970) and Colori ed improvvisazioni for orchestra (1973) gave him international recognition. He is also known for his extensive choral output. His later works include concertos for cello, violin and trumpet.

He died in Helsinki, and is buried in the Hietaniemi Cemetery
