= Discography of Sibelius symphony cycles =

Recordings of works by Jean Sibelius

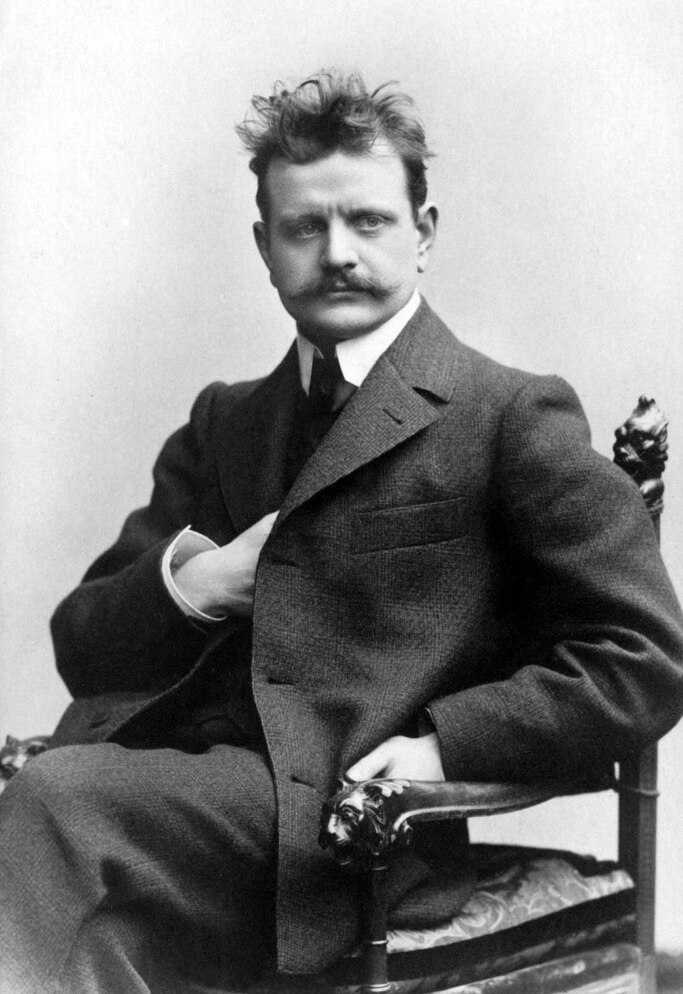
Jean Sibelius composed seven symphonies over the course of his career. A recording of the complete set is called the "Sibelius cycle".

The Finnish composer Jean Sibelius (1865–1957) was one of the most important symphonists of the early twentieth century: his seven symphonies, written between 1899 and 1924, are the core of his oeuvre and stalwarts of the standard concert repertoire. As such, many of classical music's conductor–orchestra partnerships have recorded the complete set, colloquially known as the "Sibelius cycle". Specifically, the standard cycle includes:

- Symphony No. 1 in E minor, (Note: The First Symphony premiered on 26 April 1899 in Helsinki, with Sibelius conducting the Helsinki Philharmonic Society. It shared the program with the tone poem The Wood Nymph, Op. 15 (1894–1895) and the Song of the Athenians, Op. 31/3 (1899), for boy's choir, male choir, and small orchestra.) Op. 39 (1899; minor revisions 1900)
- Symphony No. 2 in D major, (Note: The Second Symphony premiered on 8 March 1902 in Helsinki, with Sibelius conducting the Philharmonic Society. It shared the program with the Overture in A minor, JS 144 (1902) and Impromptu, Op. 19 (1902; revised 1910), for female choir and orchestra.) Op. 43 (1902)
- Symphony No. 3 in C major, (Note: The Third Symphony premiered on 25 September 1907 in Helsinki, with Sibelius conducting the Philharmonic Society. It shared the program with the tone poem Pohjola's Daughter, Op. 49 (1906) and Belshazzar's Feast, Op. 51 (1907), a concert suite Sibelius had excerpted from his theatre music, JS 48 (1906), to Hjalmar Procopé's play.) Op. 52 (1907)
- Symphony No. 4 in A minor, (Note: The Fourth Symphony premiered on 3 April 1911 in Helsinki, with Sibelius conducting the Philharmonic Society. It shared the program with the tone poems Nightride and Sunrise, Op. 55 (1908) and The Dryad, Op. 45/1 (1910), as well as two additional orchestral works: In memoriam, Op. 59 (1909; revised 1910), and Canzonetta, Op. 62a (1911).) Op. 63 (1911)
- Symphony No. 5 in E-flat major, (Note: The initial version of the Fifth Symphony (then in four movements) premiered on 8 December 1915 in Helsinki, with Sibelius conducting the Helsinki Philharmonic Orchestra. It shared the program with the tone poem The Oceanides, Op. 78 (1913–1914; revised 1914) and the Two Serenades, Op. 69 (1912–1913) for violin and orchestra, with Richard Burgin as soloist. Four years later, on 24 November 1919 in Helsinki, Sibelius premiered the definitive version of the Fifth, again with the Philharmonic Orchestra. Programmed alongside it was Song of the Earth, Op. 93 (1919), a cantata for mixed choir; and, the Six Humoresques, Op. 87/89 (1917–1918; No. 1 revised 1940), for violin and orchestra, with Paul Cherkassky as soloist.) Op. 82 (1915; major revisions 1916 and 1919)
- Symphony No. 6 in D minor, (Note: The Sixth Symphony premiered on 19 February 1923 in Helsinki with Sibelius conducting the Philharmonic Orchestra. It shared the program with: Autrefois, Op. 96b (1920); Valse chevaleresque, Op. 96c (1922); the Suite champêtre for strings, Op. 98b (1922); the Suite caractéristique, Op. 100 (1922) for strings and harp; and, La Chasse from the Scènes historiques II, Op. 66 (1912).) Op. 104 (1923)
- Symphony No. 7 in C major, (Note: The Seventh Symphony—then titled Fantasia sinfonica and not counted among the numbered symphonies—premiered on 24 March 1924 in Stockholm, with Sibelius conducting the Concert Society Orchestra. It shared the program with the First Symphony and the Violin Concerto in D minor, Op. 47 (1904; revised 1905), with Julius Ruthström as soloist.) Op. 105 (1924)

Although early advocates such as Robert Kajanus, Sir Thomas Beecham, Serge Koussevitzky, Georg Schnéevoigt, and Leopold Stokowski had each recorded a few of Sibelius's symphonies for gramophone in the 1930s and 1940s, none of these Sibelians undertook all seven. (Kajanus's death in July 1933 prevented him from completing the cycle.) Instead, the earliest complete traversal dates to 1953, four years before the composer's death on 20 September 1957; it is by Sixten Ehrling and the Stockholm Radio Orchestra, recorded from 1952 to 1953 for the Swedish label Metronome Records. Ehrling had outpaced Anthony Collins and the London Symphony Orchestra, whose cycle—recorded from 1952 to 1955 on Decca Records—was concurrent with Ehrling's but arrived second. Since these two pioneering examples, the Sibelius cycle has, as of June 2026, been recorded an additional 49 times. The most recently completed (51st) cycle, finished in 2025, is by Jukka-Pekka Saraste and the Helsinki Philharmonic Orchestra. Two projected cycles—one by Yannick Nézet-Séguin and the Orchestre Métropolitain, the other by Nicholas Collon and the Finnish Radio Symphony Orchestra—are also in progress.

In terms of superlatives, a number of conductors have tackled the project more than once. Paavo Berglund (1977, 1987, 1997, 1998) recorded the Sibelius cycle four times, while Sir Colin Davis (1976, 1994, 2008) and Saraste (1989, 1993, 2025) have done so three times. Furthermore, Akeo Watanabe (1962, 1981), Lorin Maazel (1968, 1992), Leif Segerstam (1992, 2004), Neeme Järvi (1985, 2005), Vladimir Ashkenazy (1984, 2007), Pietari Inkinen (2009, 2013), Sir Simon Rattle (1987, 2015), and Osmo Vänskä (1997, 2015) have recorded the cycle twice. (Notably, two important Sibelians, Eugene Ormandy and Herbert von Karajan, never completed the cycle: neither man ever recorded the Third, while Ormandy, too, never recorded the Sixth.)

The Sibelius cycle can, in its non-standard form, also include its "grand precursor" Kullervo (Op. 7, 1892), which some commentators view as a programmatic choral symphony. This perspective conceptualizes Kullervo as Sibelius's de facto "Symphony No. 0", thus expanding his completed contributions to the symphonic canon from seven to eight. Twelve of the 51 cycles include Kullervo as a supplement.

== Precursors: 1930–1947 ==
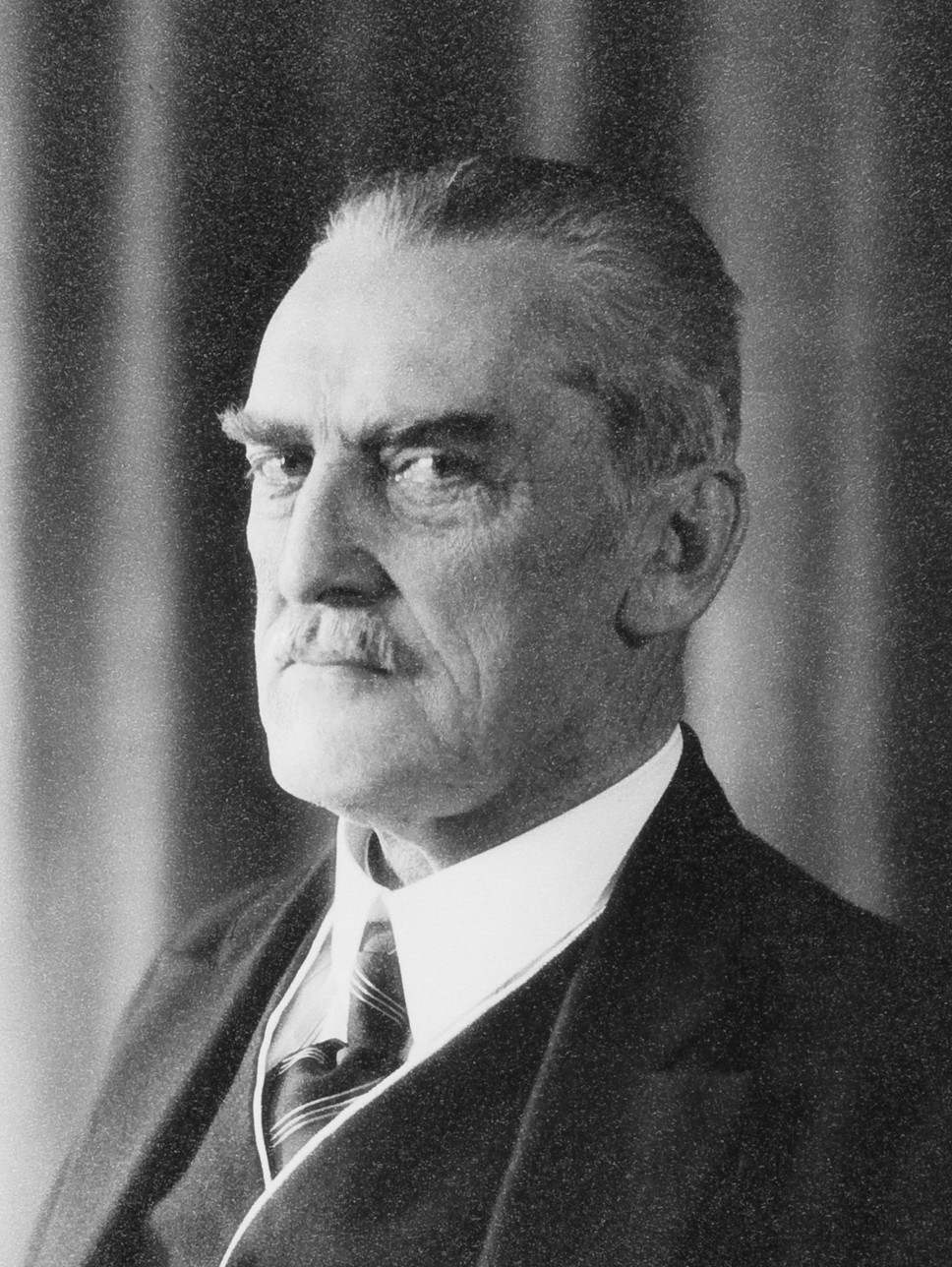
From 1930 to 1932, Robert Kajanus made premiere recordings of the First, Second, Third, and Fifth. His death prevented him from completing the first cycle.

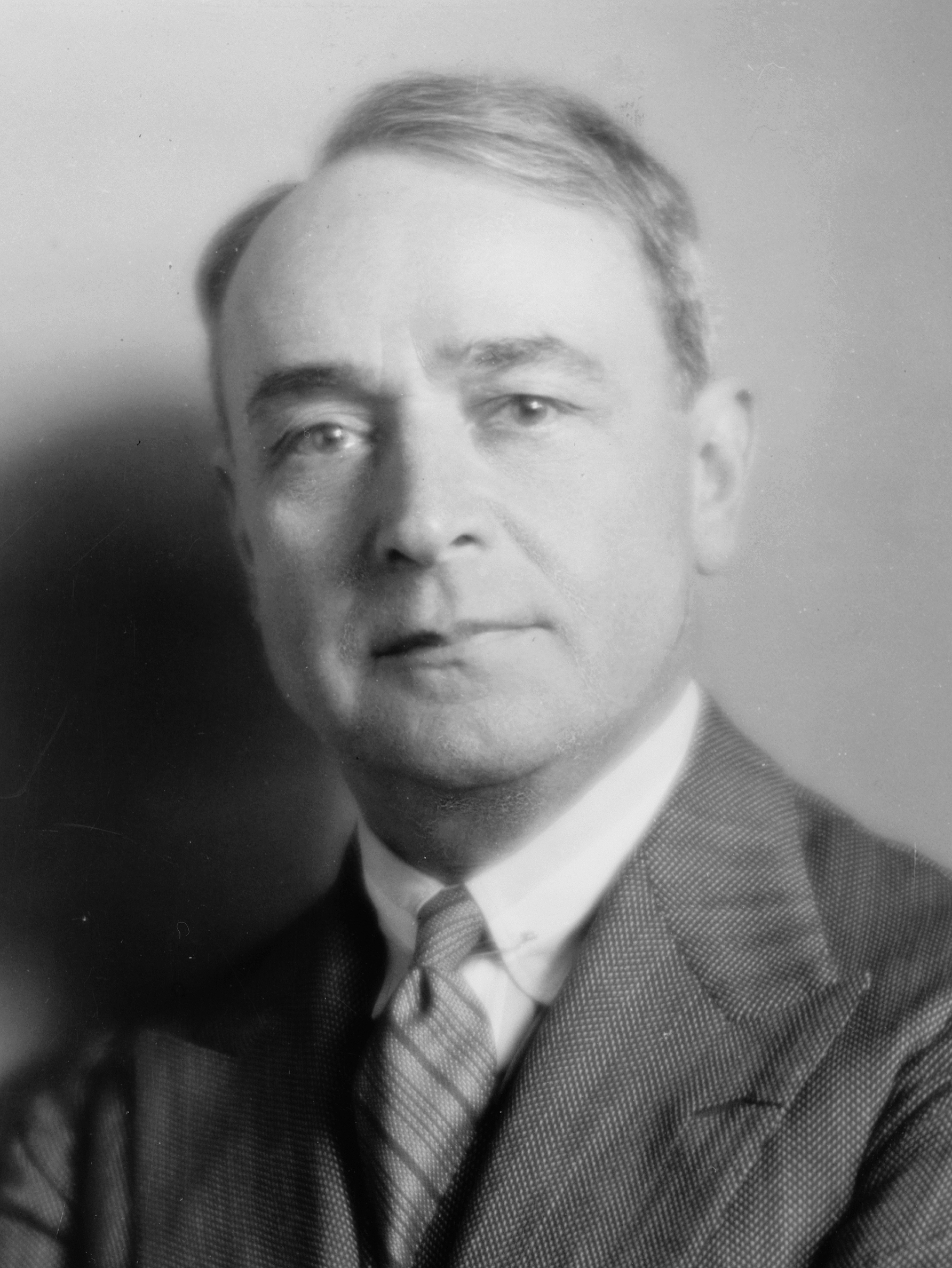
Sergei Koussevitzky was the first to program the entire cycle in a concert season (1932–1933, Boston); he also made the premiere recording (1933) of the Seventh.

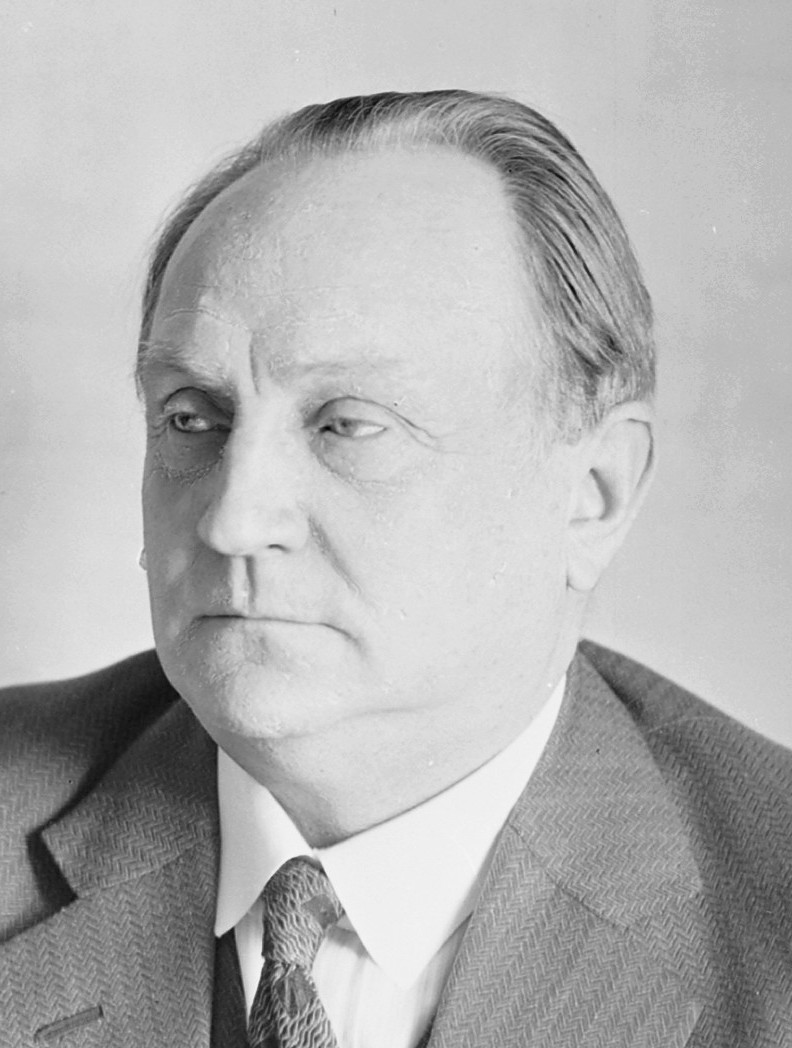
In 1934, Georg Schnéevoigt made the premiere recording of the Sixth and the second of the Fourth; Sibelius expressed disappointment with the performances.

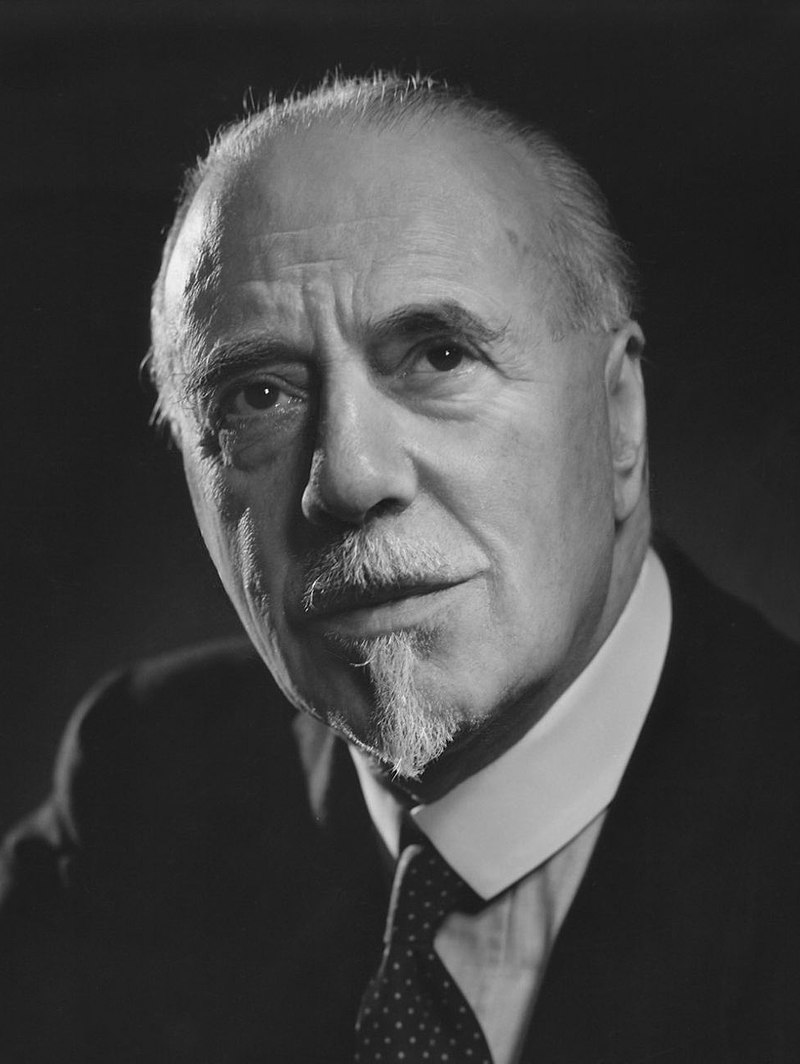
Sir Thomas Beecham's recordings of the Fourth and Sixth replaced Schnéevoigt's in the HMV catalogue. Sibelius called the latter his "favourite recording".

In 1930, the Finnish government, perceiving a wide audience for Sibelius's works, enlisted Britain's Columbia Graphophone Company (later merged in 1931 with His Master's Voice to form EMI) to record the First and Second symphonies. The government's subsidization of such an artistic project (it contributed 50,000 Finnish marks) was, according to Sibelius's biographer Erik Tawaststjerna, "an enlightened and at this time unprecedented gesture ... a measure of the unique importance Finland attached to Sibelius as a national figure". Sibelius was permitted his choice of native-born conductors and selected his long-time interpreter, Robert Kajanus, writing of the septuagenarian conductor, "Very many are the men who have conducted these symphonies during the last thirty years, but there are none who have gone deeper and given them more feeling and beauty than Robert Kajanus".

The First and Second were recorded in the Westminster Central Hall on 21–23 and 27–28 May, respectively; although the orchestra was credited as the "Royal Philharmonic Orchestra", the musicians were "largely drawn from the London Symphony [Orchestra], which could not be named for contractual reasons". Two years later, in 1932, the British record producer Walter Legge founded the His Master's Voice Sibelius Society, a subscription service that promised to record "all his [Sibelius's] major works and to culminate in the forthcoming Eighth Symphony". Legge enlisted Kajanus—by then in ill health—to record the Third (21–22 June) and Fifth (22–23 June) symphonies at Abbey Road Studio No. 1, again with the London Symphony Orchestra (this time properly credited). Each of Kajanus's recordings was a world premiere and, because of his close association with and personal selection by Sibelius, they "can generally be regarded as authoritative ... he communicates overwhelmingly a sense of total identification with the composer's mind".

Legge and His Master's Voice had planned for Kajanus to complete the cycle by recording the Fourth, Sixth, and Seventh symphonies, but the maestro's death on 6 July 1933 prevented it. At Sibelius's "express wish", they turned to the Finnish conductor Georg Schnéevoigt to record the Fourth and the Sixth in June 1934; Schnéevoigt was touring London with the Helsinki Philharmonic Orchestra (it was billed as the "Finnish National Orchestra"), the principal conductorship of which he had inherited in April 1933 due to Kajanus's ill health. They recorded the Sixth in studio on 3 June (its world premiere recording) and the Fourth at a public concert on 4 June (its second recording, the premiere having been by Leopold Stokowski and the Philadelphia Orchestra on 23 April 1932 for Victor Records). However, Sibelius did not approve the test pressings of Schnéevoigt's Fourth and Legge did not issue it commercially; although Sibelius permitted the release of Schnéevoigt's Sixth, his response to the performance was tepid.

With the Schnéevoigt recordings lacking favour, the English conductor Sir Thomas Beecham stepped in to fill the void: for Legge, he and the London Philharmonic Orchestra recorded the Fourth on 10 December 1937 at Abbey Road. To prepare this performance, Beecham referenced a "detailed list of [Sibelius's] comments concerning tempi, phrasing, note durations, and so on", which the composer had sent to Legge upon hearing Schnéevoigt's Fourth. As such, Beecham's performance is seen as adhering more closely to Sibelius's standards. Ten years later, in 1947, Beecham and the Royal Philharmonic Orchestra would displace Schnéevoigt's Sixth, recording the work for Legge from May to November 1947 at Kingsway Hall. According to Robert Layton, Sibelius is said to have referred to Beecham's Sixth as "his favourite recording of any of his symphonies". (Note: Beecham left behind an extensive recorded legacy as a Sibelian. In addition to the performances of the Fourth and Sixth mentioned above, he also recorded the Second twice and the Seventh three.)

A final important Sibelian from this period was the Russian émigré conductor Serge Koussevitzky, an "energetic disciple" to whom Sibelius had promised the world premiere of the ever-elusive Eighth Symphony. (Note: According to the music critic and Sibelius "evangelist" Olin Downes, Koussevitzky was a late convert to the cause, having initially in 1924 dismissed Sibelius's oeuvre as "so dark". By the 1930s, however, Koussevitzky had become a "zealot" in service to Sibelius's music.) Koussevitzky and the Boston Symphony Orchestra performed the entire cycle during the 1932–1933 season (a programming first), (Note: The archives of the Boston Symphony Orchestra contain the concert programs that correspond to this landmark cycle: No. 1: 11–12 November 1932; No. 2: 25–26 November 1932; No. 3: 9–10 December 1932; No. 4: 16–17 December 1932; No. 5: 27–28 January 1933; No. 6: 10–11 March 1933; No. 7: 21–22 April 1933.; Having inaugurated the cycle with the Boston premiere of Tapiola (4–5 November 1932), Koussevitzky had hoped—in vain, as it turned out—to conclude the cycle with the world premiere of the Symphony No. 8.) and while in London to guest conduct the BBC Symphony Orchestra at the Queen's Hall, Koussevitzky made the world premiere recording of the Seventh Symphony at a public concert on 15 May 1933. Koussevitzky dispatched the test pressings to Sibelius with a 6 June letter: "if they [the discs] do not please you, they will be destroyed"; the composer, however, was pleased, writing on 3 July: "I find it hard to express the joy I experienced when I listened to you dear Maestro ... Everything was so full of life and natural, and I cannot thank you sufficiently". Although he never obtained the Eighth (Sibelius abandoned the project and destroyed the score), Koussevitzky's advocacy remained undiminished: he commercially recorded the Second on 24 January 1935 and the Fifth on 29 December 1936, as well as an additional Second on 29 November 1950, six months before his death. (Note: In the 1960s, Rococo Records issued LPs of "off-air" recordings from the 1940s of Koussevitzky conducting the Boston Symphony Orchestra in performances of the First, Fifth, Sixth, and Seventh symphonies.)

The table below contains details of Legge's unofficial, 'precursor' cycle (including Schnéevoigt's subsequently displaced recording of the Sixth, but not his unreleased Fourth):

Legge's first cycle
Conductor	Orchestra	Years (Note: Refers to the timespan over which the conductor-orchestra pairing recorded the work(s); this may not be the same as the year(s) in which the recordings were first released to the general public.)		Symphony runtime (Note: All runtimes are official, as printed on CD or LP liner notes. For some recordings, the notes only provide runtimes for a symphony's constituent movements; in these cases, the movement runtimes were added to obtain a total duration.)							Recording venue	Original label	Comments (Note: All recordings are stereo unless noted otherwise.)	Ref.
Conductor	Orchestra	Start	End	1	2	3	4	5	6	7	Recording venue	Original label	Comments	Ref.
Robert Kajanus	"Royal Philharmonic Orchestra" (i.e., LSO)	1930	1932	35:32	39:20	29:54	–	29:39	–		Westminster Central Hall ^{(1–2)} Abbey Road Studio No. 1 ^{(3, 5)}	HMV/EMI	Recorded in mono	
Sergei Koussevitzky	BBC Symphony Orchestra	1933		–						21:16	Queen's Hall	HMV/EMI	Recorded in mono	
Georg Schnéevoigt	"Finnish National Orchestra" (i.e., HPO)	1934		–					26:13	–	Abbey Road Studio No. 1	HMV/EMI	Recorded in mono	
Sir Thomas Beecham	London Philharmonic Orchestra	1937		–			32:14	–			Abbey Road Studio No. 1	HMV/EMI	Recorded in mono	
Sir Thomas Beecham	Royal Philharmonic Orchestra	1947		–					26:14	–	Kingsway Hall	HMV/EMI	Recorded in mono	

== Sibelius cycles: 1952–present ==
=== Complete cycles ===
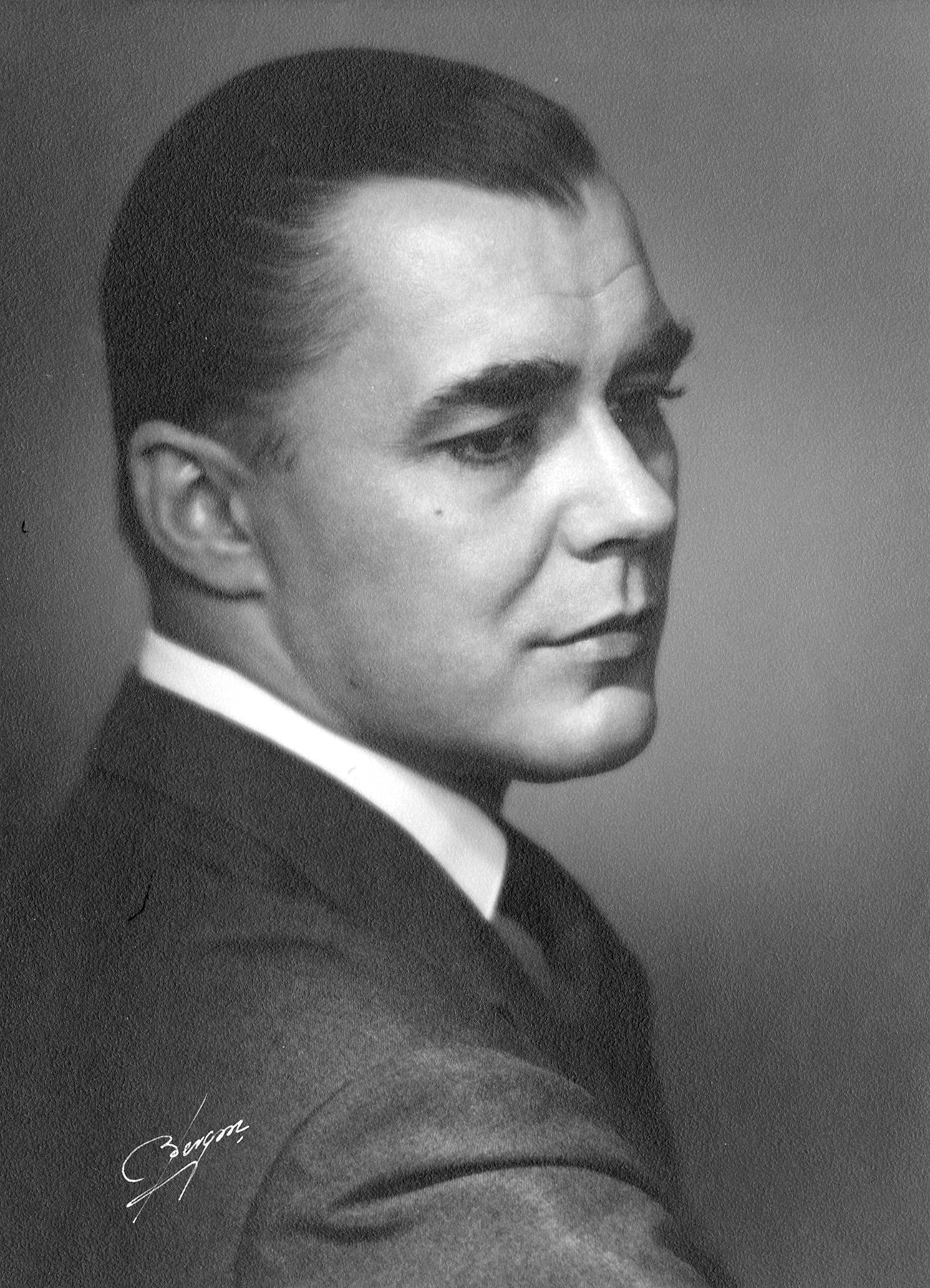
In 1953, the Swedish conductor Sixten Ehrling and the Stockholm Radio Orchestra completed the first recorded Sibelius cycle.

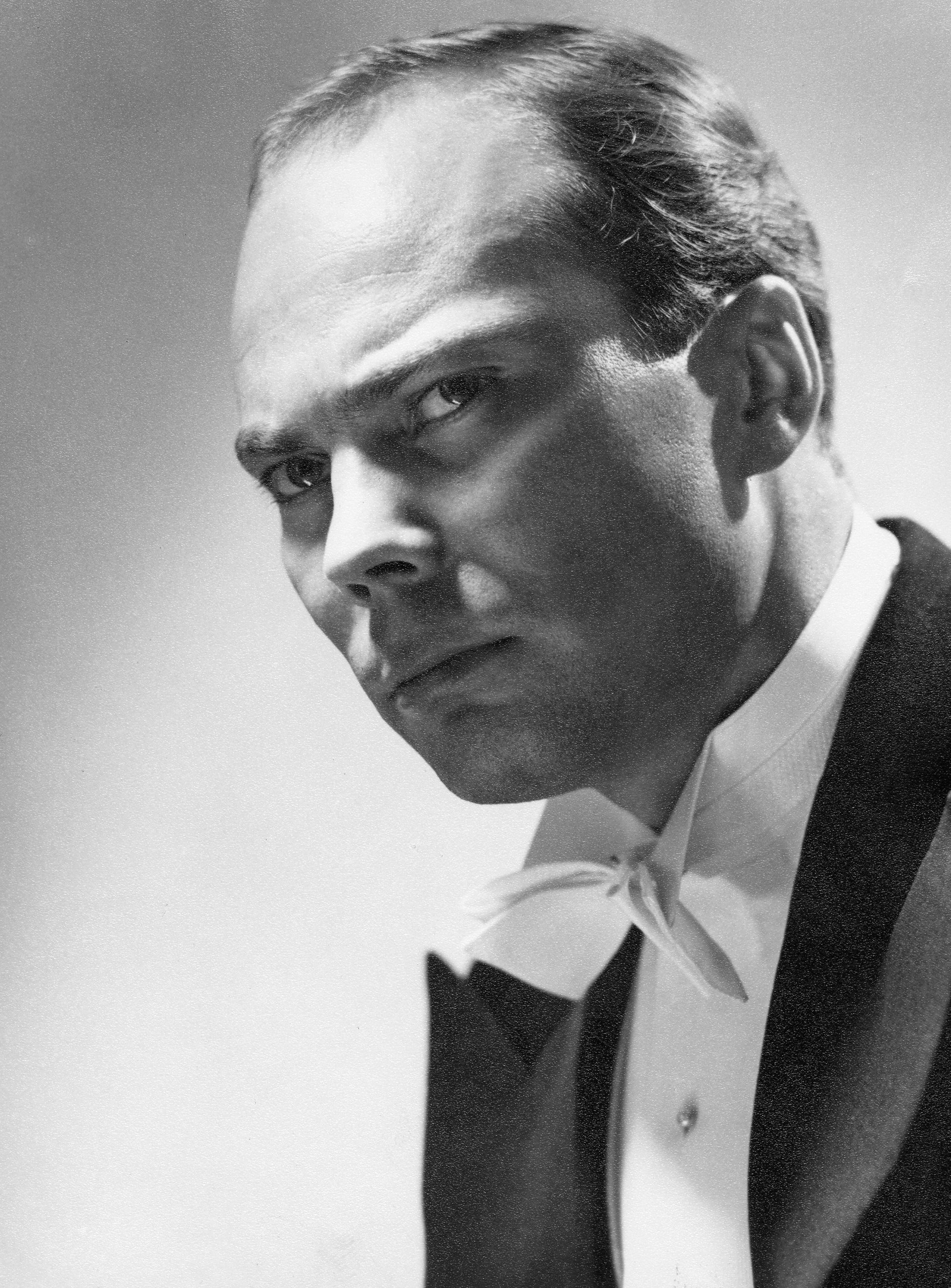
Paavo Berglund recorded the cycle four times. His earliest, with the Bournemouth Symphony Orchestra in 1977, was the first by a Finn.

Although early advocates from the 1930s and 1940s had conducted many of Sibelius's symphonies from gramophone, none of these Sibelians recorded all seven. In February 1952, Metronome (the United States distributor was Mercury) and Decca each began cycles: the former enlisted the Swedish conductor Sixten Ehrling and the Stockholm Radio Orchestra (now the Royal Stockholm Philharmonic Orchestra), whereas the latter employed the English conductor Anthony Collins and the London Symphony Orchestra. For his cycle, Ehrling visited Sibelius at Ainola on 10 June 1952, "loaded with practical questions concerning interpretation and the composer's intentions"; but Sibelius's demurred, refusing to "confine the interpretations of his music to any specific edicts; each artist must be allowed to work according to his capacity and imagination". Ehrling outpaced Collins, completing his Sibelius cycle—history's first—in January 1953; Collins finished two years later in January 1955. These would be the only two cycles completed in Sibelius's lifetime.

Both the Ehrling and the Collins cycles were recorded in mono; the Japanese conductor Akeo Watanabe and Japan Philharmonic Orchestra were the first to stereo, completing their cycle for Nippon Columbia in 1962 (the United States distributor was Epic). A patriotic milestone arrived in June 1977, when the Finnish conductor Paavo Berglund became the first of Sibelius's countrymen to record the cycle (with the Bournemouth Symphony Orchestra, EMI). Ten years later in July 1987, the Helsinki Philharmonic Orchestra became the first Finnish ensemble to complete the cycle (with Berglund, EMI).

The sortable table below contains all commercial recordings of the complete Sibelius cycle. To date, it has been recorded 51 times by 36 conductors (of whom 12 are or were Finns, Sibelius's countrymen) and 35 orchestras (three Finnish). In terms of superlatives, Berglund (1977, 1987, 1997, 1998) holds the record for the most cycles by a conductor. The record for an ensemble is jointly held by the London Symphony Orchestra (1955, 1994, 2008), the Japan Philharmonic Orchestra (1962, 1981, 2013), the Finnish Radio Symphony Orchestra (1989, 1993, 2014), the Gothenburg Symphony Orchestra (1985, 2005, 2024), and the Helsinki Philharmonic Orchestra (1987, 2004, 2025), at three apiece. Finally, among record labels, Decca has produced a record five cycles (Collins, 1955; Maazel, 1968; Ashkenazy, 1984; Blomstedt, 1995; and Mäkelä, 2021).

Complete Sibelius cycles: 1952–present
No.	Conductor	Orchestra	Years		Symphony runtime							Recording venue	Original label	Comments	Ref.
No.	Conductor	Orchestra	Start	End	1	2	3	4	5	6	7	Recording venue	Original label	Comments	Ref.
1	Sixten Ehrling	Stockholm Radio Orchestra (1)	1952	1953	37:02	42:13	29:00	34:10	27:19	26:39	19:57	Musikaliska, Nybrokajen 11	Metronome (Note: In the U.S., the original distributor of the Sixten Ehrling–Stockholm Radio Orchestra cycle was Mercury Records. In 1999, Finlandia Records reissued the cycle.)	Recorded in mono	
2	Anthony Collins	London Symphony Orchestra (1)	1952	1955	34:27	40:32	24:35	31:39	29:30	28:24	19:40	Kingsway Hall	Decca	Recorded in mono	
3	Akeo Watanabe (1)	Japan Philharmonic Orchestra (1)	1962	1962	37:44	42:14	30:53	34:55	30:08	26:55	20:48	Tokyo Bunka Kaikan ^{(1, 3–4)} Suginami Public Hall ^{(2, 7)} Bunkyo Public Hall ^{(5–6)}	Nippon Columbia (Note: In the U.S., the original distributor of the Akeo Watanabe–Japan Philharmonic Orchestra cycle (1962) was Epic Records. In 1996, Denon reissued the cycle.)	First cycle recorded in stereo	
4	Thomas Jensen	Danish Radio Symphony Orchestra (1)	1957	1963	35:52	40:23	29:48	33:41	27:28	27:07	21:39	Danish Radio Concert Hall ^{(5–7)}[Unknown] ^{(1, 3–4)} (Note: For the Thomas Jensen—Danish Radio Symphony Orchestra recordings, Danacord's liner notes explicitly designate the Danish Radio Concert Hall as the venue only for Symphonies Nos. 5–6 ("live recording") and 7 ("studio broadcast recording"). No. 3 is listed as a "studio broadcast" recording, albeit with the venue omitted. Additionally, No. 1 is listed as a "concert recording" while No. 4 is listed as a "concert broadcast".) [Unknown venue], Helsinki ^{(2)}	Danacord	Recorded in mono	
5	Leonard Bernstein	New York Philharmonic	1960	1967	36:37	44:37	26:31	39:26	32:49	26:41	22:46	Philharmonic Hall ^{(1–4, 6–7)} Manhattan Center ^{(5)} (Note: In 2015, Sony Classical released a remastered edition of the Bernstein–NYPO cycle (88875026142), which superseded an earlier 2003 release (SM4K 87329). These releases, however, contain conflicting recording information; these discrepancies are as follows: 2003 release: (No. 1) 3 March 1967 in Philharmonia Hall; (No. 2) 15 May 1966 in Philharmonia Hall; (No. 5) 27 March 1961 in Philharmonia Hall; (No. 7) 28 March 1960 & 26 October 1965 in Philharmonia Hall; 2015 release: (No. 1) 14 March 1967 in Philharmonia Hall; (No. 2) 16 May 1966 in Philharmonia Hall; (No. 5) 27 March 1961 in Manhattan Hall; (No. 7) 28 March 1960 in Philharmonia Hall; The table above uses the 2015 liner notes.)	Columbia Masterworks (Note: The Bernstein–New York Philharmonic cycle was reissued by Columbia Masterworks in both the 1970s and 1980s. In 1993 (No. 81–82 of "The Royal Edition") and again in 2015 (the "Remastered Edition"), Sony Classical reissued the cycle, as well. In the liner notes to the 2015 remaster, Sony Classical incorrectly promotes the Bernstein–NYPO cycle as "the first complete Sibelius symphony cycle in stereo ... there had only been two previous traversals of all seven symphonies on disc, both in mono, both dating from the previous decade". In point of fact, Nippon Columbia's 1962 Watanabe–Japan PO cycle (which the Sony liner notes do not reference) was the first to stereo.)	–	
6	Lorin Maazel (1)	Vienna Philharmonic	1963	1968	36:10	43:18	26:27	32:49	27:28	24:32	21:22	Sofiensaal	Decca	–	
7	Sir John Barbirolli	The Hallé (1)	1966	1970	41:50	45:57	32:47	36:17	33:15	29:54	21:54	Kingsway Hall	EMI (Note: The Barbirolli–Hallé cycle was reissued in 2000 by EMI Classics and in 2013 by Warner Classics.)	–	
8	Gennady Rozhdestvensky	Moscow Radio Symphony Orchestra	1969	1974	38:25	44:58	26:59	33:58	29:32	27:52	20:51	[Unknown]	Melodiya	–	
9	Sir Colin Davis (1)	Boston Symphony Orchestra	1975	1976	39:14	44:48	29:36	37:09	32:04	24:34	21:20	Boston Symphony Hall	Philips (Note: The Sir Colin Davis–Boston Symphony Orchestra cycle was reissued in 2012 by Decca Records.)	–	
10	Maurice Abravanel	Utah Symphony Orchestra	1977	1977	36:44	43:00	29:14	34:32	29:16	28:11	21:14	Mormon Tabernacle	Vanguard Classics	–	
11	Kurt Sanderling	Berlin Symphony Orchestra	1970	1977	40:03	45:28	27:24	36:03	32:27	29:19	23:49	Berlin Christuskirche	ETERNA (Note: The Kurt Sanderling–Berlin Symphony Orchestra cycle was reissued in 1996 by Berlin Classics and in the early 2000s by Brilliant Classics.)	–	
12	Paavo Berglund (1)	Bournemouth Symphony Orchestra	1972	1977	39:00	44:53	31:13	37:22	32:11	31:32	21:55	Southampton Guildhall ^{(1, 3, 5, 7)} Abbey Road Studios ^{(2, 4)} Kingsway Hall ^{(6)}	EMI (Note: EMI Classics first reissued the Paavo Berglund–Bournemouth Symphony Orchestra cycle (and Kullervo) from 2000–2001, as well as a second time from 2005–2008 (the "Gemini – The EMI Treasures" series). Finally, a reissue by Warner Classics arrived in 2013.)	First full cycle by a Finnish conductor	
13	Akeo Watanabe (2)	Japan Philharmonic Orchestra (2)	1981	1981	38:47	42:29	28:38	33:54	31:06	27:06	21:18	Hitomi Memorial Hall ^{(1–2, 4–5, 7)} Narashino Cultural Hall ^{(3, 6)}	Denon	–	
14	Sir Alexander Gibson	Royal Scottish National Orchestra	1982	1983	37:23	41:16	26:13	31:03	29:19	27:21	20:35	SNO Centre Hall	Chandos	–	
15	Vladimir Ashkenazy (1)	Philharmonia Orchestra	1979	1984	39:36	46:21	29:31	32:59	31:35	28:16	22:30	Kingsway Hall ^{(2–5, 7)} Walthamstow Town Hall ^{(1, 6)}	Decca	–	
16	Neeme Järvi (1)	Gothenburg Symphony Orchestra (1)	1982	1985	38:38	41:52	29:14	37:50	33:39	27:25	20:45	Gothenburg Concert Hall	BIS	–	
17	Sir Simon Rattle (1)	City of Birmingham Symphony Orchestra (1)	1984	1987	41:35	44:53	28:34	37:37	30:27	29:41	22:30	Warwick Arts Centre	EMI (Note: The Sir Simon Rattle–City of Birmingham Symphony Orchestra cycle was reissued in 1991 and again in 2007 by EMI Classics, as well as in 2015 by Warner Classics.)	–	
18	Paavo Berglund (2)	Helsinki Philharmonic Orchestra (1)	1984	1987	36:13	39:50	28:36	34:12	30:24	28:53	21:24	Kulttuuritalo ^{(1–3, 5–6)} All Saints Church ^{(4, 7)}	EMI (Note: The Paavo Berglund–Helsinki Philharmonic Orchestra cycle was reissued in 1995–1996 and again in 2005 by EMI Classics, as well as in 2017 by Warner Classics.)	First full cycle by a Finnish orchestra	
19	Jukka-Pekka Saraste (1)	Finnish Radio Symphony Orchestra (1)	1987	1989	38:19	43:38	27:35	34:30	32:26	30:13	21:00	Kulttuuritalo	RCA Red Seal	–	
20	Adrian Leaper	Slovak Philharmonic	1989	1990	36:05	43:16	26:33	35:00	30:39	26:43	20:25	Reduta Concert Hall	Naxos	–	
21	Leif Segerstam (1)	Danish National Symphony Orchestra (2)	1990	1992	42:58	47:07	31:47	39:51	34:56	31:38	22:14	Danish Radio Concert Hall	Chandos	–	
22	Lorin Maazel (2)	Pittsburgh Symphony Orchestra	1990	1992	40:16	46:53	27:31	39:33	31:35	27:21	25:53	Heinz Hall	Sony Classical	–	
23	Jukka-Pekka Saraste (2)	Finnish Radio Symphony Orchestra (2)	1993	1993	36:51	42:09	27:10	32:19	31:33	28:43	19:38	Saint Petersburg Philharmonia	Finlandia	–	
24	Sir Colin Davis (2)	London Symphony Orchestra (2)	1992	1994	39:34	46:38	30:17	37:18	30:17	26:05	22:51	Blackheath Halls ^{(1–2, 4, 6–7)} Watford Town Hall ^{(3, 5)}	RCA Red Seal	–	
25	Herbert Blomstedt	San Francisco Symphony	1989	1995	39:32	44:32	29:14	36:20	31:09	29:48	22:27	Davies Symphony Hall	Decca	–	
26	Osmo Vänskä (1)	Lahti Symphony Orchestra (1)	1996	1997	35:04	44:44	30:32	39:27	31:20	26:45	22:44	Ristinkirkko	BIS (Note: The Vänskä–Lahti SO cycle also includes the world premiere recording of the original 1915 version of the Fifth Symphony. BIS subsequently made the Vänskä–Lahti SO cycle part of its 13-volume The Sibelius Edition series (Vol. 12, 'Symphonies', BIS-CD-1933/35; released in 2011).)	Part of BIS's The Sibelius Edition	
27	Paavo Berglund (3)	Chamber Orchestra of Europe (1)	1995	1997	36:27	41:31	29:55	33:11	30:28	28:17	22:04	RFO Hall, Hilversum ^{(1–3)} Watford Colosseum ^{(4, 6–7)} Nijmegen Town Hall ^{(5)}	Finlandia	–	
28	Paavo Berglund (4)	Chamber Orchestra of Europe (2)	1998	1998	37:59	43:16	30:59	33:51	33:11	29:09	22:27	Finlandia Hall	ICA Classics	Blu-ray, DVD	
29	Petri Sakari	Iceland Symphony Orchestra	1996	2000	38:07	45:02	29:06	37:47	31:17	30:22	22:45	Reykjavík University Hall ^{(1–3)} Reykjavík Concert Hall ^{(4–7)}	Naxos	–	
30	Sakari Oramo	City of Birmingham Symphony Orchestra (2)	2000	2003	37:07	44:10	29:46	35:48	31:14	27:01	21:19	Birmingham Symphony Hall	Erato	–	
31	Leif Segerstam (2)	Helsinki Philharmonic Orchestra (2)	2002	2004	38:14	45:45	29:57	37:50	33:49	30:12	21:04	Finlandia Hall	Ondine	–	
32	Neeme Järvi (2)	Gothenburg Symphony Orchestra (2)	2001	2005	38:49	46:40	30:31	38:41	32:01	31:16	24:37	Gothenburg Concert Hall	Deutsche Grammophon	–	
33	Vladimir Ashkenazy (2)	Royal Stockholm Philharmonic (2)	2006	2007	38:21	44:44	27:23	32:17	31:04	27:04	20:36	Stockholm Concert Hall	Exton	–	
34	Sir Colin Davis (3)	London Symphony Orchestra (3)	2002	2008	39:35	44:43	30:48	38:42	30:57	25:47	22:27	Barbican Centre	LSO Live (Note: This orchestra records under its in-house label.)	–	
35	Arvo Volmer	Adelaide Symphony Orchestra	2007	2008	36:18	42:50	28:27	34:55	31:46	31:06	19:42	Adelaide Town Hall	ABC Classics	–	
36	Pietari Inkinen (1)	New Zealand Symphony Orchestra	2008	2009	40:18	44:16	29:36	36:29	33:05	29:19	21:04	Michael Fowler Centre	Naxos	–	
37	Pietari Inkinen (2)	Japan Philharmonic Orchestra (3)	2013	2013	40:15	46:21	30:06	38:42	33:54	30:19	21:41	Suntory Hall ^{(1, 3–7)} Yokohama Minato mirai Hall ^{(2)}	Naxos Japan	–	
38	John Storgårds	BBC Philharmonic	2012	2013	38:35	45:46	28:58	34:49	32:35	28:12	22:12	MediaCityUK	Chandos (Note: The Storgårds–BBC Phil cycle also includes the world premiere recording of three fragments purported to belong to Sibelius's Eighth Symphony, a piece that the composer destroyed in the late-1930s to early-1940s.)	–	
39	Okko Kamu	Lahti Symphony Orchestra (2)	2012	2014	38:24	44:56	29:29	38:07	34:42	29:06	22:40	Sibelius Hall	BIS	–	
40	Hannu Lintu	Finnish Radio Symphony Orchestra (3)	2012	2014	41:16	45:49	30:12	40:15	34:20	30:58	22:32	Helsinki Music Centre	Arthaus Musik (Note: The Lintu–Finnish RSO cycle, a collaboration between Arthaus Musik and the Finnish Broadcasting Company (YLE) released in 2015 in honor of the 150th anniversary of Sibelius's birth, comprises audiovisual recordings of live performances from 2012 to 2014. The cycle is available either on Blu-ray or DVD (but not CD). A documentary film—with commentary from the conductor—proceeds each symphony.)	Blu-ray, DVD	
41	Sir Simon Rattle (2)	Berlin Philharmonic	2014	2015	37:39	43:12	28:17	36:50	30:32	29:13	21:48	Berlin Philharmonie	Berlin Phil	Also as Blu-ray	
42	Tadaaki Otaka	Sapporo Symphony Orchestra	2013	2015	37:25	44:15	28:57	35:32	30:23	28:20	22:13	Sapporo Concert Hall	Fontec	–	
43	Osmo Vänskä (2)	Minnesota Orchestra	2011	2015	34:43	46:14	29:50	38:28	30:50	28:58	22:01	Minneapolis Orchestra Hall	BIS	–	
44	Kim Dae-jin	Suwon Philharmonic Orchestra	2015	2015	37:54	42:31	29:15	33:58	30:30	28:58	23:27	Suwon SK Artrium	Sony Classical	–	
45	Paavo Järvi	Orchestre de Paris	2012	2016	39:49	44:37	28:55	35:59	31:38	29:16	21:32	Salle Pleyel ^{(1, 6–7)} Philharmonie de Paris ^{(2–5)}	RCA Red Seal	–	
46	Sachio Fujioka	Kansai Philharmonic Orchestra	2012	2018	40:01	43:50	29:06	39:40	32:37	30:40	20:48	The Symphony Hall, Osaka	ALM Records	–	
47	Sir Mark Elder	The Hallé (2)	2006	2019	39:03	46:44	29:50	41:07	30:40	28:41	22:34	New Broadcasting House ^{(1)} Bridgewater Hall ^{(2–7)}	Hallé	–	
48	Klaus Mäkelä	Oslo Philharmonic	2021	2021	39:54	46:03	30:03	37:52	34:02	31:23	22:45	Oslo Concert Hall	Decca	–	
49	Owain Arwel Hughes	Royal Philharmonic Orchestra	2019	2021	41:03	47:50	31:44	39:05	31:21	30:25	21:07	St John's Smith Square	Rubicon Classics	–	
50	Santtu-Matias Rouvali	Gothenburg Symphony Orchestra (3)	2018	2022	39:42	45:29	31:28	36:56	31:11	30:18	21:09	Gothenburg Concert Hall	Alpha Classics	–	
51	Jukka-Pekka Saraste (3)	Helsinki Philharmonic Orchestra (3)	2023	2025	37:13	41:32	27:09	32:41	30:53	28:54	19:58	Helsinki Music Centre	Ondine, Deutsche Grammophon	CD (Ondine), VOD (DG) (Note: Saraste's third Sibelius cycle was first released in 2025 "as a series of high-quality multi-camera live productions" on DG's streaming service Stage+. In June 2026, the Finnish record label Ondine released the same cycle on CD.)	

=== Complete cycles including Kullervo ===
Additionally, the Sibelius cycle can, in its non-standard form, include Kullervo (Op. 7, 1892), a five-movement symphonic work for soprano, baritone, male choir, and orchestra. This piece, which predates the First Symphony by seven years and in 1893 launched the young Sibelius as an important composer for orchestra, features sung text from Runos XXXV–VI of the Kalevala, Finland's national epic. Kullervo eschews obvious categorization, in part due to Sibelius's own ambivalence: at the premiere, program and score each listed the piece as a "symphonic poem"; yet, Sibelius nevertheless referred to Kullervo as a symphony both while composing the piece and again in retirement when reflecting on his decades-long career.

Today, many commentators prefer to view Kullervo as a programmatic choral symphony, variously due to its deployment of sonata form in the first movement, its thematic unity and recurring material, and its massive scale. Such a perspective thus conceptualizes Kullervo as Sibelius's de facto "Symphony No. 0", thereby expanding his completed contributions to the symphonic canon from seven to eight. Twelve of the Sibelius complete cycles listed above also include Kullervo. The sortable table below lists recording information for these performances. (Note: Recordings of Kullervo by Paavo Järvi and Sakari Oramo, respectively, are not included in the table below, because each is with an orchestra different from the one with which they recorded the Sibelius cycle.)

Complete cycles that include Kullervo
No.	Conductor	Orchestra	Soloists	Male choir(s)	Year	Time	Recording venue	Original label	Ref.
12	Paavo Berglund (1)	Bournemouth Symphony Orchestra	Raili Kostia, Usko Viitanen	YL Male Voice Choir	1970	71:45	Southampton Guildhall	EMI	
16	Neeme Järvi (1)	Gothenburg Symphony Orchestra	Karita Mattila, Jorma Hynninen	Laulun Ystävät Male Choir	1985	69:45	Gothenburg Concert Hall	BIS	
18	Paavo Berglund (2)	Helsinki Philharmonic Orchestra	Eeva-Liisa Saarinen, Jorma Hynninen	YL Male Voice Choir, Estonian National Male Choir	1985	71:46	Kulttuuritalo	EMI	
21	Leif Segerstam (1)	Danish National Symphony Orchestra	Soile Isokoski, Raimo Laukka	Danish National Radio Choir	1994	75:50	Danish Radio Concert Hall	Chandos	
23	Jukka-Pekka Saraste (2)	Finnish Radio Symphony Orchestra	Monica Groop, Jorma Hynninen	Polytech Choir	1996	69:46	Kulttuuritalo	Finlandia	
24	Sir Colin Davis (2)	London Symphony Orchestra	Hillevi Martinpelto, Karl-Magnus Fredriksson	London Symphony Chorus	1996	80:59	Walthamstow Assembly Hall	RCA Red Seal	
26	Osmo Vänskä (1)	Lahti Symphony Orchestra	Lilli Paasikivi, Raimo Laukka	YL Male Voice Choir	2000	80:34	Sibelius Hall	BIS	
31	Leif Segerstam (2)	Helsinki Philharmonic Orchestra	Soile Isokoski, Tommi Hakala	YL Male Voice Choir	2007	77:56	Finlandia Hall	Ondine	
34	Sir Colin Davis (3)	London Symphony Orchestra	Monica Groop, Peter Mattei	London Symphony Chorus	2005	72:12	Barbican Centre	LSO Live	
37	Pietari Inkinen	Japan Philharmonic Orchestra	Johanna Rusanen, Ville Rusanen	YL Male Voice Choir, Tokyo College of Music Male Chorus	2023	74:00	Suntory Hall	Japan Phil	
40	Hannu Lintu	Finnish Radio Symphony Orchestra	Johanna Rusanen, Ville Rusanen	Polytech Choir, Estonian National Male Choir	2018	72:28	Helsinki Music Centre	Ondine	
43	Osmo Vänskä (2)	Minnesota Orchestra	Lilli Paasikivi, Tommi Hakala	YL Male Voice Choir	2016	79:29	Minneapolis Orchestra Hall	BIS	

=== Projected cycles in progress ===
The sortable table below includes two projected, in-progress Sibelius cycles, which—once completed—would constitute the 52nd and 53rd entries in the commercial catalogue.

Projected cycles in progress
Conductor	Orchestra	Years	Symphony runtime							Recording venue	Original label	Ref.
Conductor	Orchestra	Years	1	2	3	4	5	6	7	Recording venue	Original label	Ref.
Yannick Nézet-Séguin	Orchestre Métropolitain	2018–present	41:05	44:54	30:29	38:08	31:26	–		Montreal Symphony House	ATMA Classique	
Nicholas Collon	Finnish Radio Symphony Orchestra	2021–present	–				31:38	–	21:00	Helsinki Music Centre ^{(5, 7)}	Ondine	

== Incomplete cycles no longer in progress: 1952–present ==
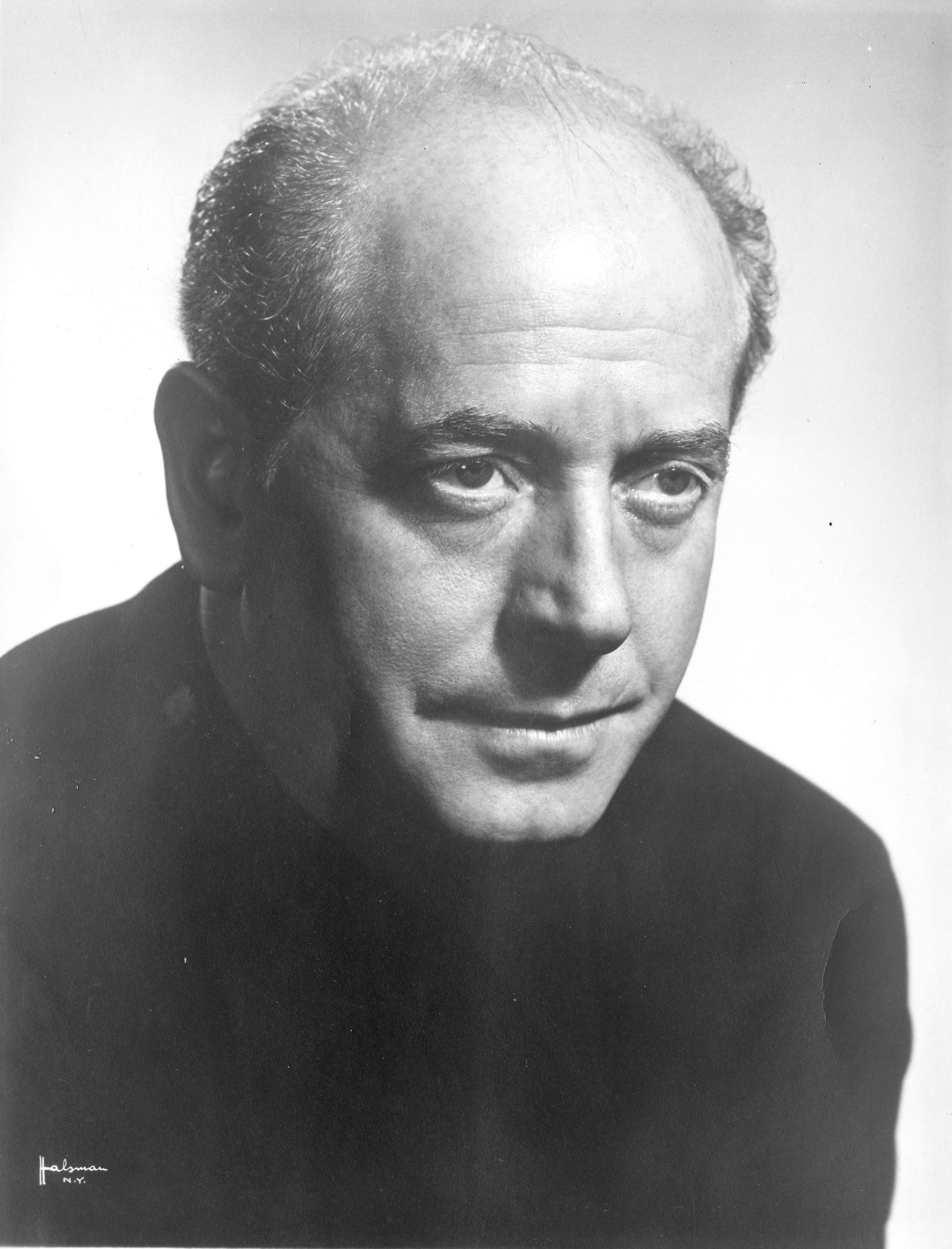
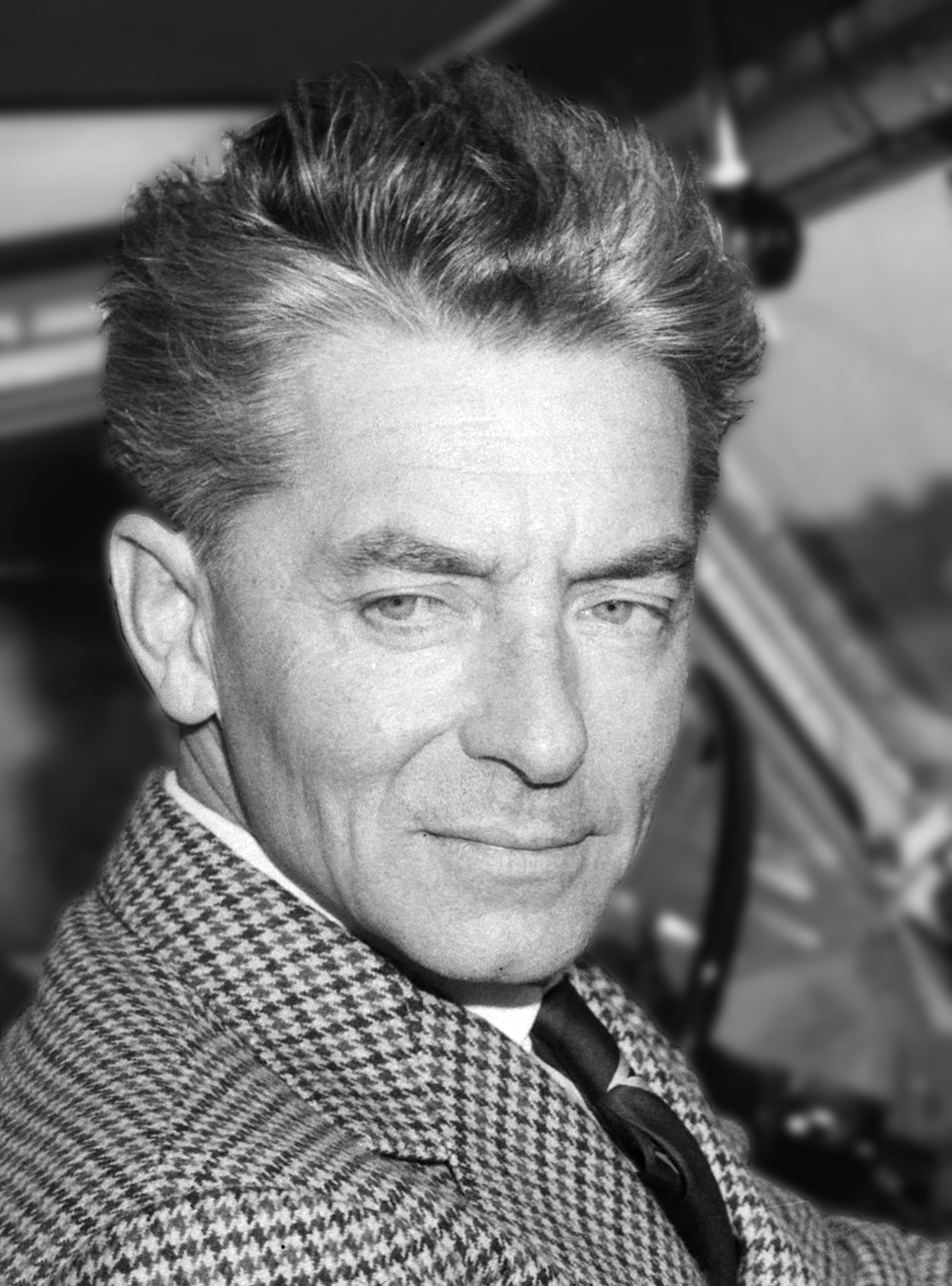
Despite being advocates for Sibelius's music, Sibelius Medalists Eugene Ormandy (left) and Herbert von Karajan (right) each never completed the cycle. Neither man ever recorded the Third; Ormandy, too, never recorded the Sixth.

In addition to the 51 completed Sibelius cycles, there are a number of incomplete traversals available to the public. Of particular note is the collaboration between the Austrian conductor Herbert von Karajan and the Philharmonia for EMI, because it occurred during Sibelius's lifetime. In 1954, Walter Legge—who, in 1932, had been instrumental in the projected Kajanus–LSO cycle—sought to woo the octogenarian composer to London, either to personally conduct the cycle or, barring that, to supervise the production of one under Karajan (then under contract with Legge's EMI):

As I believe I have already told you, Herbert von Karajan is, in my view, of all the leading conductors, the one with the greatest insight into your music. If you are completely happy with his performances of these three great works [Symphonies Nos. 4 and 5, recorded in 1952; and Tapiola, 1953], I would be deeply grateful if you would write and tell me so, because if Herbert von Karajan's performances satisfy you, it is my intention to record all of your symphonies to be published in time for the celebration of your ninetieth birthday ...

— Walter Legge, in a September 1954 letter to Jean Sibelius

Subsequently, Sibelius voiced his approval to Legge in person, remarking: "Karajan is the only one who really understands my music". In the end, Karajan recorded Symphonies Nos. 4–7 with the Philharmonia before Sibelius's death, all in mono; and, in 1960, he added to this set stereo recordings of Nos. 2 and 5. Given that in 1955, Legge and the Philharmonia had recorded Symphonies Nos. 1–3 with the Polish conductor Paul Kletzki, this gives them an unofficial 'complete cycle' when combined with Karajan's work.

The sortable table below includes these and other incomplete Sibelius cycles for which a conductor recorded with the same orchestra at least three of the seven symphonies.

Incomplete cycles no longer in progress
Conductor	Orchestra	Years		Symphony runtime							Recording venue	Original label	Comments	Ref.
Conductor	Orchestra	Start	End	1	2	3	4	5	6	7	Recording venue	Original label	Comments	Ref.
Paul Kletzki	Philharmonia Orchestra	1955	1955	35:20†	40:28‡	27:24†	–				Kingsway Hall	EMI (Note: Later to EMI Classics and Warner Classics)	† = mono, ‡ = stereo	
Hans Rosbaud	Südwestfunk-Orchester Baden-Baden	1955	1961	–	41:25	–	40:23	29:28	–		Studio V, Baden-Baden	SWR	Recorded in mono	
Eugene Ormandy (Note: In 1935, prior to his recordings with the Philadelphia Orchestra, Eugene Ormandy recorded Sibelius's Symphony No. 1 in mono for RCA Red Seal with the Minneapolis Symphony Orchestra.)	Philadelphia Orchestra	1941		36:18	–						Philadelphia Academy of Music	RCA Red Seal (Note: Later to Sony Classical)	Recorded in mono	
Eugene Ormandy	Philadelphia Orchestra	1947	1954	–	41:11	–	31:19	28:57	–		Philadelphia Academy of Music	Columbia Masterworks (Note: All later to Sony Classical.)	Recorded in mono	
Eugene Ormandy	Philadelphia Orchestra	1957	1962	39:41‡	43:48†	–				22:34‡	Scottish Rite Cathedral ^{(1)} Broadwood Hotel ^{(2, 7)}	Columbia Masterworks	† = mono, ‡ = stereo	
Eugene Ormandy	Philadelphia Orchestra	1972	1978	41:49	44:35	–	32:13	33:38	–	23:42	Scottish Rite Cathedral	RCA Red Seal (Note: Later to Sony Classical)	–	
Herbert von Karajan	Philharmonia Orchestra	1952	1960	–	45:47‡	–	35:59†	32:28†; 30:46‡	28:00†	25:01†	Kingsway Hall	EMI (Note: Later to EMI Classics and Warner Classics)	† = mono, ‡ = stereo	
Herbert von Karajan	Berlin Philharmonic	1965	1967	–			36:08	31:34	28:49	23:18	Jesus-Christus-Kirche	Deutsche Grammophon (Note: Since the 1970s, Deutsche Grammophon has packaged the Karajan–Berlin PO recordings of Symphonies Nos. 4–7 with recordings of Nos. 1–3 by the Finnish conductor Okko Kamu, who 1969 won the first Herbert von Karajan Conducting Competition; Kamu's First and Third are with the Finnish Radio Symphony Orchestra, while his Second is with the Berlin Phil. From 2012 to 2014, Kamu recorded a complete cycle with the Lahti Symphony Orchestra for BIS.)	–	
Herbert von Karajan	Berlin Philharmonic	1976	1981	38:48	47:48	–	39:01	32:33	27:23	–	Berliner Philharmonie	EMI (Note: Later to EMI Classics and Warner Classics)	–	
Leonard Bernstein	Vienna Philharmonic	1986	1990	41:18	51:30	–		35:34	–	24:54	Wiener Musikverein ^{(1–2, 7)} Wiener Konzerthaus ^{(5)}	Deutsche Grammophon	Bernstein's second survey	
James Levine	Berlin Philharmonic	1991	1994	–	40:15	–	37:20	29:21	–		Konzerthaus Berlin ^{(2)} Jesus-Christus-Kirche ^{(4)} Berliner Philharmonie ^{(5)}	Deutsche Grammophon	–	
Mariss Jansons	Oslo Philharmonic	1990	1994	38:01	42:13	28:08	–	29:46	–		Oslo Konserthus	EMI Classics (Note: EMI founded the sublabel EMI Classics in 1990, which subsequently enlisted Mariss Jansons and the Oslo Philharmonic to record Symphonies Nos. 1–3 and 5. These were reissued by Warner Classics in 2009.)	–	
Adrian Leaper	Orquesta Filarmónica de Gran Canaria	1996	1997	37:47	45:10	–		32:16	29:26	21:26	Nave Industrial, El Cebadal, Las Palmas de Gran Canaria	Arte Nova Classics	Leaper's second survey	
Paavo Berglund	London Philharmonic Orchestra	2003	2005	–	43:43	–		31:40	28:35	22:37	Royal Festival Hall	LPO Live	Berglund's fifth survey	
Paul Mägi	Uppsala Chamber Orchestra	2004	2011	38:16	–	31:15	34:50	–		20:54	Uppsala University Hall ^{(3–4)}Uppsala Konsert & Kongress ^{(1, 7)}	Swedish Society Discofil	–	
Thomas Søndergård	BBC National Orchestra of Wales	2012	2014	38:10	41:53	–		30:12	28:30	20:33	BBC Hoddinott Hall ^{(1–2, 6–7)} St. David's Hall ^{(5)}	Linn ^{(1–2, 6–7)} BBC ^{(5)} (Note: Although their official—albeit incomplete—cycle with Linn Records only includes Symphonies Nos. 1–2 and 6–7 (all recorded in 2014), Thomas Søndergård and the BBC National Orchestra of Wales had earlier, in 2012, recorded Symphony No. 5 for BBC Music Magazine.)	–	
