= Symphony No. 7 (Sibelius) =

Symphony in one movement by Jean Sibelius

- by Jean Sibelius
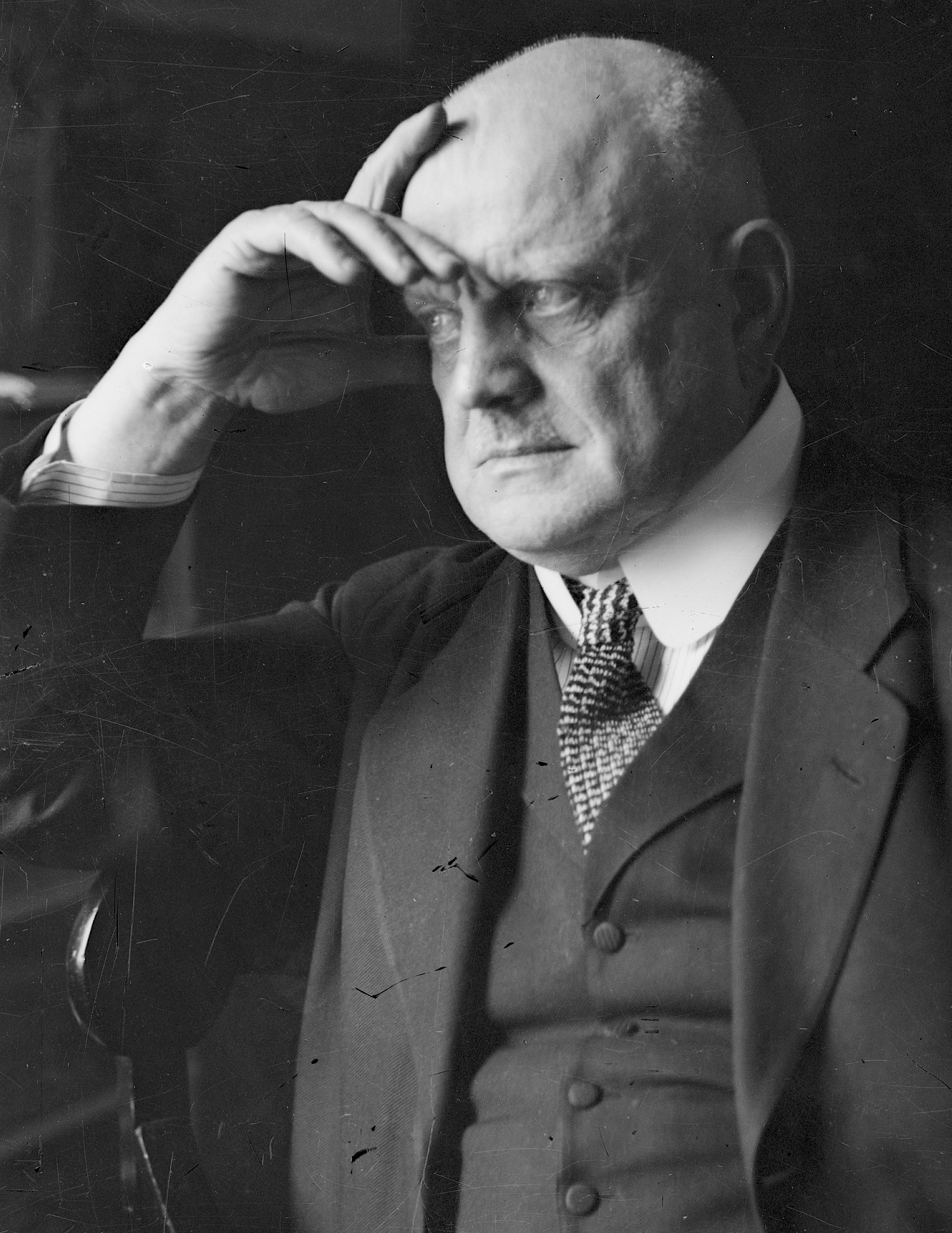
- The composer (c. 1925)
- Key: C major
- Opus: 105
- Composed: 1914–1924
- Publisher: Hansen (1925)
- Duration: 22 mins.
- Movements: 1

Premiere
- Date: 24 March 1924
- Location: Stockholm, Sweden
- Conductor: Jean Sibelius
- Performers: Stockholm Concert Society

The Symphony No. 7 in C major, Op. 105, is a single-movement work for orchestra written from 1914 to 1924 by the Finnish composer Jean Sibelius.

The composition is notable for having only one movement, in contrast to the standard symphonic formula of four movements. It has been described as "completely original in form, subtle in its handling of tempo, individual in its treatment of key and wholly organic in growth" and "Sibelius's most remarkable compositional achievement".

After Sibelius finished its composition on 2 March 1924, the work was premiered in Stockholm on 24 March as Fantasia sinfonica No. 1, a "symphonic fantasy". The composer was apparently undecided on what name to give the piece, and only granted it status as a symphony after some deliberation. For its publication in 1925, the score was titled "Symphony No. 7 (in one movement)".

== Composition ==
The concept of a continuous, single-movement symphony was one Sibelius only reached after a long process of experimentation. His Symphony No. 3, dating from 1907, contained three movements, an earlier fourth movement having been fused into the third. The final result was successful enough for Sibelius to use the same idea in his Symphony No. 5, completed in 1915. Although his first mention of No. 7 occurred in December 1918, the source for its material has been traced back to around 1914, the time when he was working on the Fifth.

In 1918 Sibelius had described his plans for this symphony as involving "joy of life and vitality with appassionato sections". The symphony would have three movements, the last being a "Hellenic rondo". Surviving sketches from the early 1920s show that the composer was working on a work of four, not three, movements. The overall key seems to have been G minor, while the second movement, an Adagio in C major, provided much of the material for the themes that eventually made up the Symphony. The first surviving draft of a single-movement symphony dates from 1923, suggesting that Sibelius may have made the decision to dispense with a multi-movement work at this time. Through the summer of 1923 the composer produced several further drafts, at least one of which is in a performable state: however the ending of the symphony was not yet fully worked out.

As 1923 turned into 1924, Sibelius was distracted from his work on the symphony by a number of outside events: the award of a large cash prize from a Helsinki foundation, family birthdays and the composition of a number of brief piano works. When he returned to the symphony, the composer drank copious amounts of whisky in order, he claimed, to steady his hand as he wrote on the manuscript paper.

Along with his Symphony No. 5 and No. 6, No. 7 was Sibelius's final home for material from Kuutar, a never-completed symphonic poem whose title roughly means "Moon Spiritess". This work helped to shape the earliest parts of No. 7, those created during the composition of Nos. 5 and 6. One of the themes from Kuutar, called Tähtölä (Where the Stars Dwell), evolved into part of No. 7's opening Adagio section.

== Importance ==
Although the symphony apparently first existed in embryonic form in D major, it eventually attained the home key of C major. There was a time when composing in C was considered fruitless—it had "nothing more to offer". But in response to this symphony, the British composer Ralph Vaughan Williams said that only Sibelius could make C major sound completely fresh. Peter Franklin, writing of the Seventh in the Segerstam–Chandos cycle of Sibelius symphonies, calls the dramatic conclusion "the grandest celebration of C major there ever was."

Sibelius lived for 33 years after finishing the Seventh, but it was one of the last works he composed. He did complete one more important orchestral work, his symphonic poem Tapiola. However, despite much evidence of work on a Symphony No. 8, it is believed that Sibelius burned whatever he had written. He left No. 7 to stand as his final statement on symphonic form.

== Form ==
Calm opening
Simon Rattle with the City of Birmingham Symphony Orchestra performs the first few bars in a calm, measured manner as suggested by the Adagio marking in this studio recording from 1985.

Faster opening
In a live concert from 1965, Yevgeny Mravinsky takes the opposite approach with the Leningrad Philharmonic Orchestra, beginning the symphony with tension and drama at a much faster tempo.

The form of the symphony is startlingly original. Since the time of Joseph Haydn, a movement in a symphony would typically be unified by an approximately constant tempo and would attain variety by use of contrasting themes in different keys. Sibelius turned this scheme on its head. The symphony is unified by the key of C (every significant passage in the work is in C major or C minor), and variety is achieved by an almost constantly changing tempo, as well as by contrasts of mode, articulation and texture. Sibelius had done something similar in the Symphony No. 5's first movement, which combines elements of a standard symphonic first movement with a faster scherzo. However, the Seventh symphony contains much wider variety within one movement.

== Instrumentation ==
The Seventh Symphony is scored for the following instruments, organized by family (woodwinds, brass, percussion, and strings):

- 2 flutes (each doubling piccolo during the central Adagio), 2 oboes, 2 clarinets (in B♭), and 2 bassoons
- 4 horns (in F), 3 trumpets (in B♭), and 3 trombones
- Timpani
- Violins (I and II), violas, cellos, and double basses

== Description ==
External audio
- Performed by the Berlin Philharmonic, Herbert von Karajan conducting
- Adagio –
- Vivacissimo – Adagio –
- Allegro molto moderato – Allegro moderato –
- Vivace – Presto – Adagio – Largamente molto

=== Adagio (bars 1–92) ===
The symphony begins with a soft roll on the timpani followed by a slow ascending syncopated C major scale (starting on the timpani's G) in the strings which leads to an unexpected chord in the remote key of A-flat minor. The interval of a minor sixth between the initial note of G and the final note of E♭ has been interpreted as a reference to the beginning of Wagner's Tristan und Isolde: the passage is followed by chords taken from that work.

A few bars later, in bar 11, a key motif is announced quietly on the flute and repeated on the clarinet:

Soon a passage is arrived at which sounds rather like a chorale, with the violas and cellos softly singing a hymnlike tune that will gradually build up to the first climax of the symphony.

As the climax approaches, the orchestra adds volume and intensity. At the climax, the first trombone announces the main tune of the symphony (bars 60–64), labelled "Aino" in sketches, after the composer's wife.

This theme reappears at key moments of the symphony, each time reaffirming C as the tonality.

=== Un pochett. meno adagio – poco affrett. – Poco a poco affrettando il Tempo al ... Vivacissimo – rallentando al ... (bars 93–221) ===
At bar 93 the tempo is marked Un pochett[ino] meno adagio (a little bit less slowly). A new theme in the Dorian mode, based on the ascending scale in the opening bars, soon appears on the oboe (bars 94 and 95):

The tempo gradually increases (affrettando) in a long sequential passage exploring several tonalities. At bar 134 the time signature slips from 3/2 into 6/4 notching up the tension. The key signature switches to C minor:

Soon the tempo is ratcheted up to Vivacissimo (very lively), with fast staccato chords traded between the strings and woodwind. The music turns stormy in mood with ominous ascending and descending scales on the strings, while the "Aino" theme is heard again in the brass:

Sibelius Symphony No. 7, bars 214–223 (extract)

=== Bars 222–496 ===
The symphony contains the following tempo markings at these points in the score:

- Adagio – Poco a poco meno lento al ... (bars 222–257)
- Allegro molto moderato – Un pochett. affrettando (bars 258–285)
- Allegro moderato – Poco a poco meno moderato (bars 286–408)
- Vivace (bars 409–448)
- Presto – Poco a poco rallentando al ... (bars 449–475)
- Adagio (bars 476–495)

=== Largamente molto – Affettuoso (bars 496–521) ===
This section ends with a chord progression from A♭ back to the symphony's main key of C major taken directly from Sibelius's earlier work Valse triste from Kuolema.

=== Tempo I (bars 522–525) ===
Ending, come scritto
Osmo Vänskä ends the symphony in his 1998 studio recording with the Lahti Symphony Orchestra by following Sibelius's instructions in the score exactly.

Ending, more dramatic
Eugene Ormandy decided to boost the violin melody with a trumpet in this 1962 studio recording with the Philadelphia Orchestra. Ormandy also adds a crescendo and a fermata to the final chord, something many conductors do in an attempt to make Sibelius's stark ending sound more conventional.

The last four measures return to the initial Adagio tempo. Logically this ought to be faster than the preceding music, which was Adagio then Largamente molto (broadening – that is, slowing – a lot), but most conductors slow down. The strings play a version of the theme from bars 11–12 against a grand C major chord held by the brass and woodwinds. Lionel Pike describes the D to C note progression followed by the B (enharmonically equivalent to C♭) to C progression in the strings as being the final resolution of the tonal dissonance created by the striking A♭ minor chord from near the beginning of the work (also for example the "dissonant" A♭ resolves to "consonant" G in the immediately preceding section). The D to C note progression is also the first two notes of the trombone's recurring "Aino" theme. Arnold Whittall describes this ending as "triumphantly abrupt".

Conclusion (bars 522–525) (some parts omitted for clarity)
