= Symphony No. 5 (Sibelius) =

Symphony in three movements by Jean Sibelius

- by Jean Sibelius
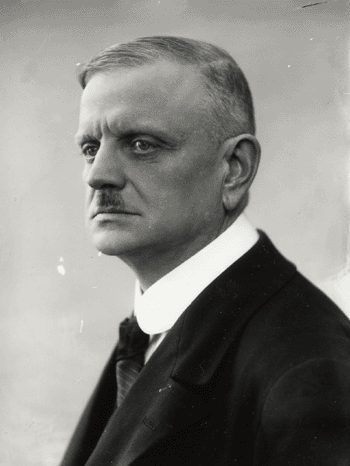
- The composer (c. 1918)
- Key: E-flat major
- Opus: 82
- Composed: 1914–1915, rev. 1916, 1917–1919
- Publisher: Hansen (1921)
- Duration: 31 mins. (orig. 35 mins.)
- Movements: 3 (orig. 4)

Premiere
- Date: 8 December 1915
- Location: Helsinki, Grand Duchy of Finland
- Conductor: Jean Sibelius
- Performers: Helsinki Philharmonic Orchestra

The Symphony No. 5 in E♭ major, Op. 82, is a three-movement work for orchestra written from 1914 to 1915 by the Finnish composer Jean Sibelius. He revised it in 1916 and again from 1917 to 1919, at which point it reached its final form.

The Finnish government commissioned Sibelius to write the symphony in honor of his 50th birthday, 8 December 1915, which had been declared a national holiday.

== History ==
During his creative process, Sibelius wrote in his diary: "It was as if God the Father was throwing pieces of mosaic from the edge of heaven and asking me to figure out what the pattern was."

The original version of the work was premiered by the Helsinki Philharmonic Orchestra, conducted by Sibelius on 8 December 1915, his 50th birthday. The second version, only part of which survives, was first performed by the Orchestra of Turun Soitannollinen Seura in Turku exactly one year later. The final version, which is the one most commonly performed today, was premiered again by the Helsinki Philharmonic, conducted by Sibelius, on 24 November 1919.

The first version of the new symphony kept much of his familiar orchestral style (consonant sonorities, woodwind lines in parallel thirds, rich melodic development, etc.) but also shows some similarities with the more modernist Fourth Symphony, featuring a few bitonal passages. The 1919 version seems more straightforward, monumental and classical, and also cleared away some digressions and ornaments. Sibelius commented on his revision: "I wished to give my symphony another – more human – form. More down-to-earth, more vivid."

The 1910s were a decade of change for the symphonic form, which had by then existed for well over a century. Meanwhile, various landmark works in other genres had presented further radical developments. In 1909, Arnold Schoenberg pushed for more and more dissonant and chromatic harmonies in his Five Pieces for Orchestra, Op. 16. From 1910 to 1913, Igor Stravinsky premiered his innovative and revolutionary ballets The Firebird, Petrushka, and The Rite of Spring. Maurice Ravel and Claude Debussy were at work developing and performing their impressionistic music. Though he had been in the public spotlight for nearly twenty years, Sibelius found his works receiving poor reviews for the first time with the 1911 premiere of his Symphony No. 4 and, as James Hepokoski has written, "was beginning to sense his own eclipse as a contending modernist."

These events may have brought Sibelius to a point of crisis, forcing him to choose between changing his style to fit with the radical changes in tonality and rhythmic language prevalent among younger composers around 1910, or continuing to develop the musical language he felt familiar with. The Finnish conductor and Sibelius specialist Hannu Lintu, in discussing Symphony No. 5 on television in 2018, said that Sibelius seems to have made a definite choice, a year or two after his previous symphony, to stay within the frames of harmonic language of late-19th-century romanticism; instead he would innovate in the realms of macrostructure and instrumental colouring.

== Instrumentation ==
The Fifth Symphony is scored for the following instruments, organized by family (woodwinds, brass, percussion, and strings):

- 2 flutes, 2 oboes, 2 clarinets (in B♭), and 2 bassoons
- 4 horns (in F), 3 trumpets (in B♭), and 3 trombones
- Timpani
- Violins (I and II), violas, cellos, and double basses

The original version of the symphony included a part for bass clarinet.

== Structure ==
External audio
- Performed by the Berlin Philharmonic under Herbert von Karajan
- I. Tempo molto moderato – Largamente –
- Allegro moderato – Presto
- II. Andante mosso, quasi allegretto
- III. Allegro molto

This symphony is unusual in its structure:

1. Tempo molto moderato – Allegro moderato (ma poco a poco stretto) – Vivace molto – Presto – Più presto (in E♭ major)
2. Andante mosso, quasi allegretto – Poco a poco stretto – Tranquillo – Poco a poco stretto – Ritenuto al tempo I (in G major)
3. Allegro molto – Misterioso – Un pochettino largamente – Largamente assai – Un pochettino stretto (in E♭ major)

Of Sibelius's multi-movement symphonies, this is the only one where every movement is in a major key.

The symphony's form is symmetrical when it comes to tempo: the first movement starts slow but ends with the fast scherzo. The second movement is neither slow nor fast; it forms a calm intermezzo. Then the third movement begins fast but ends slowly. The duration is approximately 32 minutes.

=== First movement ===
Sibelius originally intended this to be two separate movements, but linked the slower introduction with the faster, waltz-like "scherzo" section to create a single form. The movement opens with a "horn call", containing much of the musical material of the work.

Though written in sonata form, the first movement can be structurally analysed in many different ways. Sibelian scholars – Cecil Gray (1935), Gerald Abraham (1947), Simon Parmet (1955), Robert Layton (1965), and James Hepokoski (1993) – have their disagreements and individual ideas as to the movement's formal divides. They debate such points as its separation into two movements, the existence of two expositions, how to functionally describe the Scherzo and Trio, and the exact location of the beginning of the recapitulation and coda.

==== Differing analytical views ====
Gray, the first musicologist to write on the piece's structure, makes no mention of sonata form, yet refers to the existence of two different subjects, seeming to imply that the movement is in sonata form. Abraham is one of the first to analyse the work in terms of sonata form and clearly lays out where he believes each section begins and why. He shows that the work opens with a double exposition, each with distinct A- and B-group material, then moves into the development of this material. He explains the distinctly melodic section beginning at the Allegro moderato as a Scherzo and Trio used as a substitute for the second half of the development. Layton disagrees with Abraham and considers the Scherzo to be the beginning of the recapitulation.

Most musicologists agreed with this analysis until Hepokoski's 1993 text Sibelius: Symphony No. 5 offered an altogether different interpretation. He argues that the piece can only be analysed in terms of what he has called "rotational form". He maintains the same divisional sections of the movement – double exposition, Scherzo, and recapitulation – but uses new vocabulary for its analysis. Hepokoski argues that Sibelius allows the material to determine form in many of his works, developing by the necessity of the music and not by an 18th- or 19th-century template; in the Fifth Symphony a circular rotation or strophe passes through sections of material, further developing it with each rotation. Through this analysis Hepokoski maintains the general location of sectional changes described by the earlier musicologists and agrees that the movement can roughly be analysed in sonata form.

===== Fusion of movements =====
The first analytical point at which musicologists have disagreed is how to confront the clear separation of the first movement into two parts. In fact, in the first two versions of the work, Sibelius divided his symphony into four movements with the Allegro moderato section of what is now the first movement separated to form a Scherzo movement. In the final 1919 version, the character changes at this point with what Gray describes as "superficial dissimilarity and independence of each other". Earlier musicologists like Parmet analysed the movement as two separate parts while Gray stressed the separateness of these sections while acknowledging their coexistence in one movement. They did so because of the clear meter change from 12/8 to 3/4. Furthermore, after this meter change, where rehearsal letters should continue from N to the end of the alphabet, they return to A, a clear sign of a beginning of a new movement.

More recent musicologists disagree with this separation into two movements on the grounds that both sections are based on the same material and in combination allow for analysis in sonata form. Abraham cites as precedent the fusion of these sections in Sibelius's Symphony No. 2 and Symphony No. 3, where the Scherzo and Finale movements are combined into one. The fusion is reflected in the score as well. Though there is a change in meter at measure 114, the tempo and compound division of the beat do not change: four measures of the 3/4 Allegro moderato correspond to one measure of the previous section. The gradual accelerando, which begins at the end (the climax) of the opening Tempo molto moderato and leads into the Allegro moderato Scherzo, continues uninterrupted to the end of the movement; indeed, without access to a score, it is difficult for the listener to identify exactly where the Scherzo section begins. Most importantly, the clear use and development of the same materials throughout indicate that this is indeed one movement. In fact, Sibelius himself most likely thought of it as one movement as he published and performed the first movement of his final 1919 version without break.

===== Double exposition =====
The second point musicologists have disputed about the first movement is the existence of two expositions. The symphony begins with soft calls in the horns, the first horn playing what becomes the main material of the A-group while the others play long notes below. The music has its own rhythmic character ("long-short-short-long") and is centred on the interval of the perfect fourth. This first theme continues in the horns and bassoons while increasingly the music is developed by the woodwinds playing sixteenth-notes in parallel third motion until the second theme is presented and eventually takes over in measure 9. It is agreed that the B-group begins by measure 18. At this point a third theme is heard in the woodwinds – like the first theme also built on the perfect fourth but this time with the defining rhythm "short-long-short" – with tremolo accompaniment in the strings. At measure 28, the fourth theme enters still in G major and distinguished by its duple (equal) subdivision of the beat in the horns and woodwinds as a chorale-like chord progression. This exposition concludes with the return of the third theme, now rhythmically in diminution and melodically circular, fading away to an afterthought.

Hepokoski points out that one would expect the end of an exposition to come with a clear cadence in the new key, in this case G major. But as the third theme fades away it is replaced in measure 36 by the first theme of the A-group, here still in G major. Though this next section proceeds in an unexpected key – G major then changing back to the tonic E♭ in measure 41 – Abraham and Layton both consider it a second or "counter" exposition, like the 18th-century repeat of the exposition. They reference the recurrence of both the A- and B-groups almost in their entirety, though here they are used to emphasize the tonic.

Hepokoski disagrees and instead uses his rotational form terminology to talk about these two sections as "Rotation 1, bars 3–35 (referential statement: 'expositional space')" and "Rotation 2, bars 36–71 (complementary rotation/'developmental exposition')" respectively. He does so based on Sibelius's choice of keys and the inclusion of developmental qualities that are used to lead toward the climax of the movement. First, whereas the A-group of the first rotation contains no accompaniment, the A-group of the second rotation contains tremolo accompaniment in the strings. Second, the key changes much earlier than previously. In measure 41, Sibelius goes back to E♭ major while still in the middle of the A-group and concludes this exposition section in this tonic key as no sonata form exposition would. Finally, the second theme in the woodwinds is developed with the sixteenth-note runs sooner and much longer than before. This section ends just as the previous one does with the third theme in diminution fading away to nothing without cadence in the strings and woodwinds. What follows is a developmental section (what Hepokoski calls Rotation 3) based on the insignificant transition that anticipated the string entrance before the B-group in the first exposition. This is followed by the development of B-group material which is brought back as the mood changes to Largamente in measure 92.

===== Scherzo =====
At the Allegro moderato in measure 114, the music changes as the second half of the movement begins in Scherzo style. Though all musicologists talk about this next section as a Scherzo, Abraham and Preston Stedman also analyse it as a continuation of the development. This has created yet another point at which musicologists have disagreed on the structural analysis. The new melodic theme that pervades the first half of the Scherzo is developed out of the second theme material of the A-group yet based on material from the first theme. These sixteenth-notes act as the pick-ups to this new theme. The key returns to E♭ major at measure 158 (rehearsal letter B) while the Scherzo continues to develop the same material.

Like any traditional Scherzo, Abraham explains that this too has a Trio section that begins at measure 218 (letter D). This starts out in E♭ major with an apparently new and distinctive trumpet melody (the timpani reinforcing the rhythm), though quickly changes to B major (bassoon and horns). This section is characterized by this new melodic material, which develops what was heard earlier and is also closely related to material from the A-group. This section can also be considered developmental as this melody is passed around the orchestra in a quasi-fugal manner.

===== Recapitulation =====
The most contested point musicologists make is the location of the beginning of the recapitulation. Hepokoski points out this ambiguity early in his analysis as consequence of "sonata deformation". Abraham explains that the Scherzo repeat after the conclusion of the Trio in measure 298 also acts as the movement's recapitulation. This section is still very Scherzo-like but is based on transformed material of the A-group. In measure 274 (letter G), the key returns to E♭ major. The texture also changes as the melody fades away and the strings begin a long rising tremolo figure as related to the woodwinds' sixteenth-note pattern of the second theme. In some ways this key change acts as a transition back to the main Scherzo section. Stedman adds to Abraham's analysis by explaining that this return to the Scherzo acts as a recapitulation to the overall sonata form structure. This can be seen in measure 324, with the rising perfect fourth motive in the violins, the A-group is stated once more in a new form in the home key of E♭. This material is increasingly passed around the orchestra and developed into a staccato quarter-note arpeggiated figure that by measure 401 (letter L) completely takes over the texture, leaving the previous material behind. In measure 471 (letter O) the second half of Abraham's recapitulation begins with the duple subdivision of the B-group theme still in E♭ major.

Layton disagrees with Abraham's analysis saying that the recapitulation begins in measure 114 with the beginning of the first Scherzo section. He explains that "while not denying the Scherzo-like character of many episodes in the second half of the movement, there is no doubt that it does in fact correspond in broad outline to the recapitulation normal in sonata form." He cites the return to the tonic in E♭ in measure 159 (letter B) and the clear origin of the A-group material for both the Scherzo and Trio.

Hepokoski takes an altogether different approach to the recapitulation. First, he structurally considers the Scherzo and recapitulation through the conclusion of the movement to all be part of the fourth and final rotation that he calls "Rotation 4, bars 106–586 ('Scherzo'; 'recapitulatory space')". When defining the location of the recapitulation within this rotation, he is unable to give specific measure numbers because it enters in a staggered manner. He shows how "the four defining 'recapitulatory' features, however – theme, tempo, Scherzo character, and 'tonic colour' – are set into place not simultaneously but one after another." The return of the "theme" happens at measure 106 with the A-group materials heard in the brass with woodwind sixteenth-notes above. What he means by "tempo" and "Scherzo character" is the accelerando into the 3/4 Allegro moderato section. Finally, he shows how "tonic colour" returns in measure 158 (letter B), putting into place all elements of the recapitulation. With the entry of the Trio section, the recapitulation is put on hold until the Scherzo returns.

===== Coda =====
Finally, sharp debate again surrounds the beginning of the coda: whether it starts in measure 507 at the Presto or measure 555 at the Più Presto as analysed by Abraham and Hepokoski respectively. An equally plausible starting place is measure 497 (6 bars before Q) at the end of the final statement of the chordal duple-rhythm B-group theme (which begins at measure 487, letter P) with its fff syncopated trombone statement of the first four rising notes of the A-group (with which the work began) and the beginning of the E♭ pedal which continues to the end of the movement. This entire ending section races in quarter-note arpeggios towards the conclusion, thus making it difficult to pinpoint the exact location of the beginning of the coda.

=== Second movement ===
This quiet movement is a set of variations on a theme of the flute heard at the beginning on the strings, played pizzicato with chirping woodwinds to create a cheerful feeling.

=== Third movement ===
This movement begins with a rapid melody in the strings, played tremolando. After this is developed, a swaying, triple-time motif begins in the horns, which is said to have been inspired by the sound of swan-calls, as well as a specific instance when the composer witnessed sixteen of them taking flight at once. Sir Donald Tovey compared this theme to Thor swinging his hammer.

Over this, Sibelius has the flutes and strings play one of his most famous melodies. Both this and the motif are developed, until in the final section the motif returns majestically in the home key. The symphony ends with one of Sibelius's most original ideas (and one that is not in the original version): the six staggered chords of the final cadence, each separated by silence.

== In popular culture ==
The third movement's "swan-call" motif has been appropriated in a number of pop songs, though some alleged borrowings are so fleeting or approximate that they may be coincidental resemblances (e.g. "Popsicles and Icicles" by The Murmaids (1963); "On My Own" by Peach Union (1996); and the song "Stories" from Disney's Beauty and the Beast: The Enchanted Christmas). Straightforward appropriation can be heard in the coda of "Beach Baby" by The First Class (1974); the main song of the movie The Small One (1978); "Since Yesterday" by Strawberry Switchblade (1984); "I Don't Believe in Miracles" by Sinitta (1988); "Oh What A Life" by Play People (2008); and "The Nek" by Stephen Rae for the 2015 Australian miniseries Gallipoli. The opening of the first movement is quoted in the opening of John Coltrane's A Love Supreme. It is believed that Coltrane did not directly quote Sibelius, but instead quoted Leonard Bernstein's On the Town which, in turn, quotes the symphony. It is also quoted in Eleanor on Dancing Mice's 2014 album Quiz Culture. It appears as incidental music in the 2012 short subject Stella. In the third episode of the third season of Mozart in the Jungle, Hailey imagines conducting this piece, with Rodrigo encouraging her.
