= Lilli Paasikivi =

Finnish mezzo-soprano (born 1965)

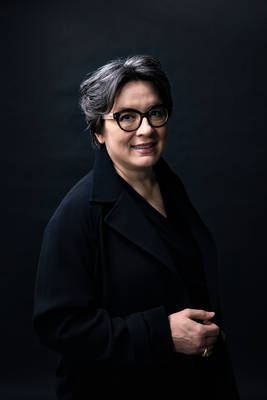
Lilli Paasikivi (photo: Jussi Hellsten), 2020

Lilli Katriina Paasikivi-Ilves (born in 1965 in Imatra, Finland) is a Finnish mezzo-soprano and cultural manager. She served as the Artistic Director of the Finnish National Opera from 2013 to 2023 and is currently the Intendant of the Bregenz Festival in Austria.

== Career ==
Paasikivi has worked to reshape operatic structures and explore the integration of new technologies into opera. In 2019, Paasikivi launched Opera Beyond – a project designed to apply emerging technological tools to opera and ballet.

As a soloist, she has performed with major orchestras including the Berlin, London, Los Angeles, and New York Philharmonic orchestras. Her repertoire spans from Rossini's coloratura roles to central parts in Verdi and Wagner operas.

At the Théâtre du Châtelet in Paris, she appeared as the Pèlerin in Kaija Saariaho's L'Amour de loin. At the Aix-en-Provence Festival she sang in the world premiere of Toshio Hosokawa's Hanjo and also performed in Sir Simon Rattle's Ring project with the Berlin Philharmonic as Fricka, a role she later sang at the Hamburg State Opera conducted by Simone Young. The mezzo-soprano roles of Wagner's Ring Cycle have been a central focus of her career, performed with conductors including Sir Simon Rattle, Simone Young, Susanna Mälkki, and Hannu Lintu.

In addition to her operatic career, Paasikivi has been active as a festival director. She founded the "Sydänkesän säveliä" festival in Kisko, Southwest Finland, in 2016, and served as artistic director of the Pyhäniemi Manor concert series from 2010 to 2015.

Paasikivi also works internationally as an expert in opera and classical music. She has served on juries of major competitions and, beginning in 2025, is a member of the board of Opera Europa.

== Awards and honours ==
- 2008 – Pro Finlandia Medal of the Order of the Lion of Finland
- 2017 – Commander's Badge of the Order of the Lion of Finland

== Personal life ==
Paasikivi has been married to violinist Jaakko Ilves since 1997; they have two children.

== Partial discography ==
- Sibelius, Kullervo, Op. 7 with Osmo Vänskä conducting the Lahti Symphony Orchestra with the Helsinki University Chorus with Raimo Laukka
- Sibelius, incidental music to Belshazzar's Feast, with the Lahti Symphony Orchestra conducted by Osmo Vänskä
- Sibelius, incidental music to The Tempest with the Lahti Symphony Orchestra conducted by Osmo Vänskä
- Sibelius, The Maiden in the Tower with the Estonian Symphony Orchestra conducted by Paavo Järvi
- Stravinsky, Le sacre du printemps and Mavra with the Gothenburg Symphony Orchestra conducted by Benjamin Zander
- Gustav Mahler, Symphony No. 3 and No. 2 with the Cincinnati Symphony Orchestra and London Symphony Orchestra conducted by Paavo Järvi
- Alma Mahler, Complete Songs with the Tampere Philharmonic Orchestra, conducted by Jorma Panula
- Einojuhani Rautavaara, Rasputin, recorded with Finnish National Opera Orchestra and Chorus conducted by Mikko Franck, together with Jorma Hynninen (baritone), Jyrki Anttila (tenor), Riikka Rantanen (mezzo-soprano), Ritva-Liisa Korhonen (soprano), Jyrki Korhonen (bass), Gabriel Suovanen (baritone), Matti Salminen (bass), and Lassi Virtanen (tenor)
- Kunniaa veisatkaa joulukonsertti (with other artists)
- Joulu tullut on (Finnish Christmas songs), with conductor Ulf Söderblom and the Jyväskylä Sinfonia
- Äidiltä Lapselle, with Pentti Kotiranta (piano)
- Elgar, The Dream of Gerontius, with Vladimir Ashkenazy conducting the Sydney Symphony Orchestra and Mark Tucker and David Wilson-Johnson (baritone). Nominated for an ARIA Award in 2012.
