= Belshazzar's Feast (Sibelius) =

Incidental music by Jean Sibelius

- Theatre score & suite by Jean Sibelius
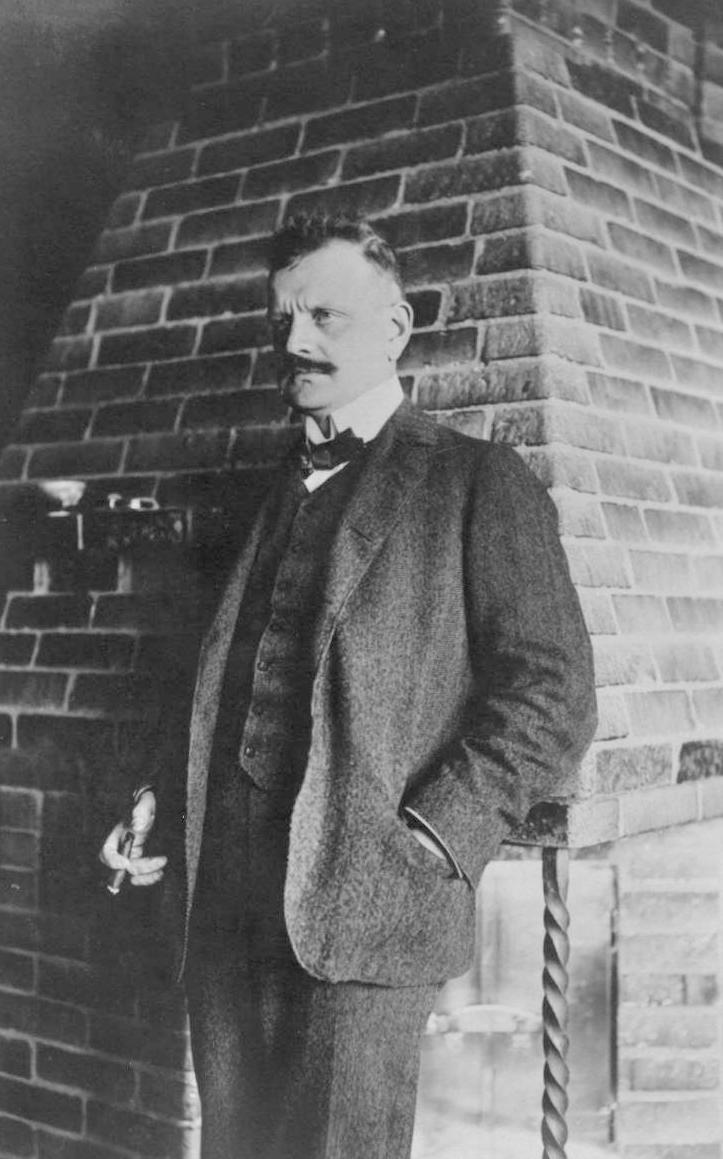
- The composer (c. 1907)
- Native name: Belsazars gästabud
- Catalogue: JS 48 (score)
- Opus: 51 (suite)
- Text: play by Hjalmar Procopé
- Language: Swedish
- Composed: 1906, arr. 1907
- Movements: 10 (JS 48); 4 (Op. 51)

Premiere
- Date: 7 November 1906
- Location: Helsinki, Grand Duchy of Finland
- Conductor: Jean Sibelius
- Performers: Helsinki Philharmonic Society

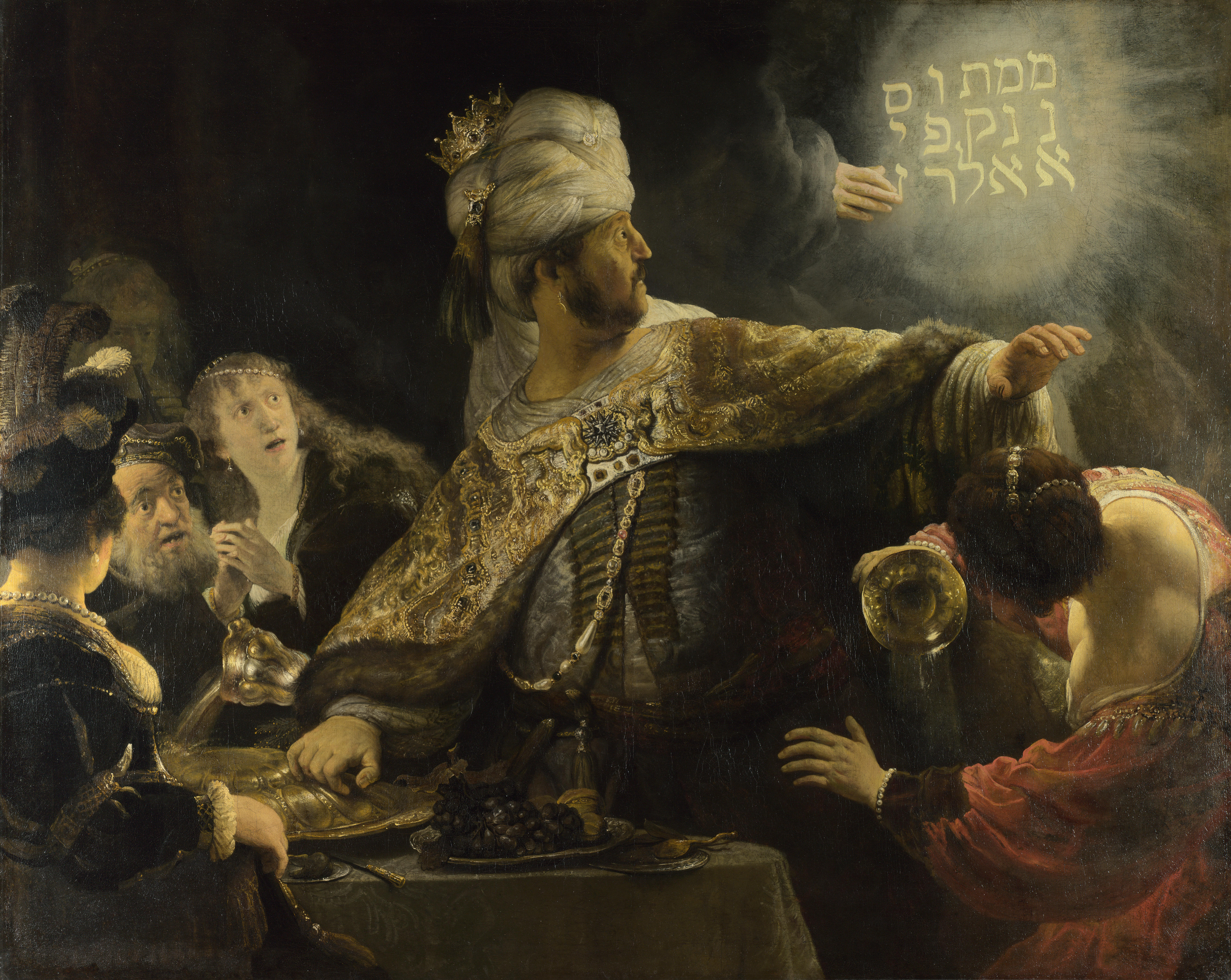
Belshazzar's Feast, (Rembrandt, c. 1635–1638)

Belshazzar's Feast (Swedish: Belsazars gästabud), JS 48, is incidental music by Jean Sibelius to a play of the same name by the journalist, poet and playwright Hjalmar Fredrik Eugen Procopé (1868−1927).

== History ==
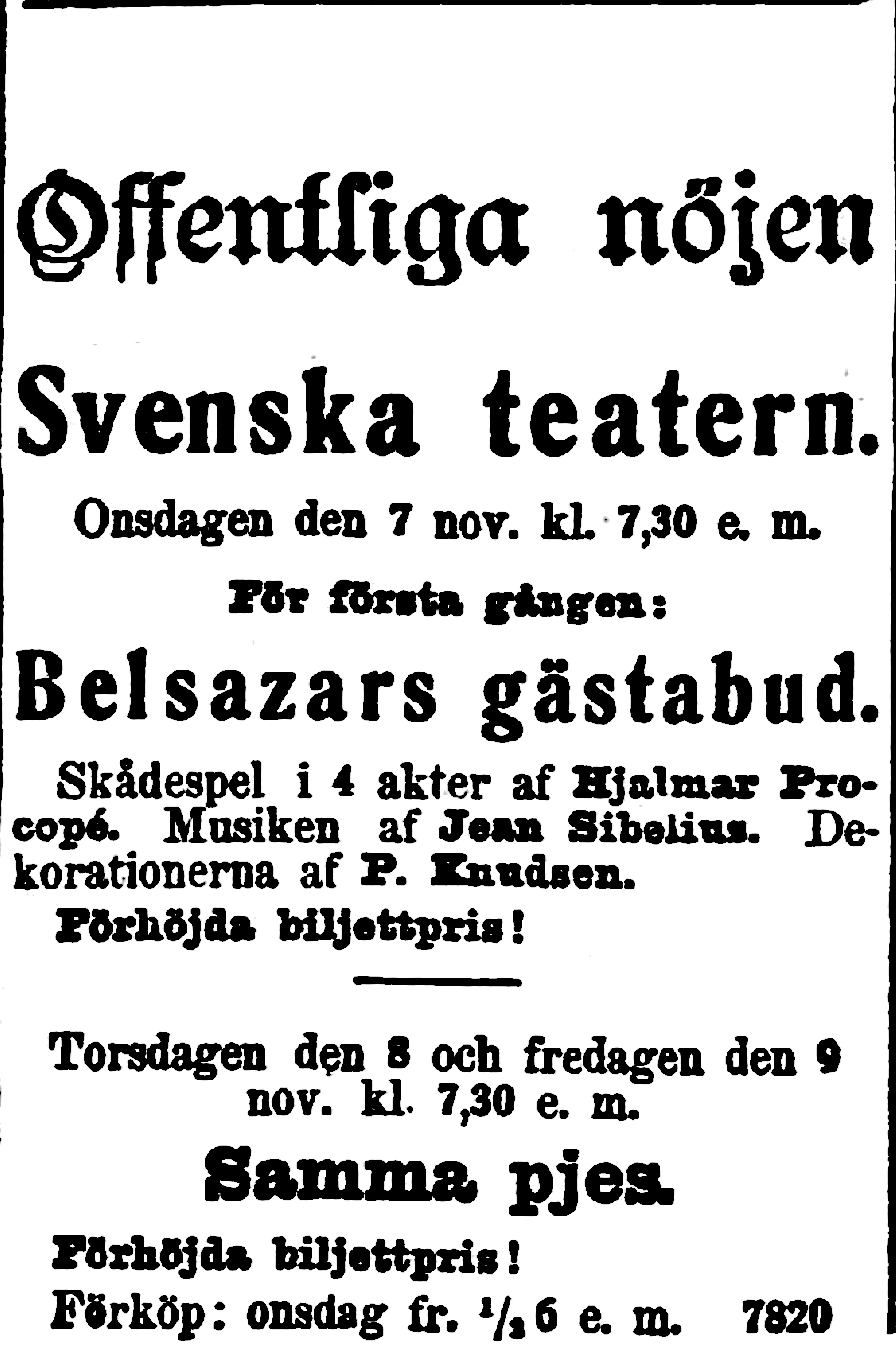
A 7 November 1906 advertisement from Nya Pressen promoting the premiere of Sibelius's incidental music to Belshazzar's Feast

Sibelius composed in 1906 eight movements, scored for orchestra, with singers also being required in some numbers. The first performance of the play and its incidental music was at the Swedish Theatre in Helsinki on 7 November 1906, conducted by the composer. It had 21 performances through to January 1907.

In 1907 Sibelius extracted a purely orchestral suite of four numbers, which is much better known than the original score. The suite has the opus number 51. It had its first performance in Helsinki on 25 September 1907, in the same concert as the premiere of the Third Symphony; the Orchestra of the Helsinki Philharmonic Society was again conducted by the composer. He also made a piano arrangement of the suite in 1907.

The Jewish Girl's Song (Den judiska flickans sång), Number 2b of the original score, existed in a number of versions. It was originally written for flute and orchestra. In 1907 it became the second movement, Solitude, of the orchestral suite. In the same year Sibelius arranged it as a song for voice and piano. In 1939, he arranged it for voice and orchestra for the American contralto Marian Anderson, under the title "Solitude".

The suite has had a number of recordings, conducted by Sir Thomas Beecham, Gennady Rozhdestvensky, Neeme Järvi, Pietari Inkinen and others.

The full original score had its world premiere recording by the Lahti Symphony Orchestra, Lilli Paasikivi (mezzo-soprano), Petri Lehto (tenor), Sauli Tiilikainen (baritone), Lahti Chamber Choir, conducted by Osmo Vänskä, as part of BIS Records' Complete Sibelius Edition.

== Structure ==
=== Incidental music ===
1. Alla marcia (Act I)
2a. Nocturne (a prelude to Act II)
2b. The Jewish Girl’s Song (Act II)
3. Allegretto (Act III)
4. Dance of Life (Act III)
5. Dance of Death (Act III)
6. (Part of No. 4)
7. Tempo sostenuto (Act IV)
8. Allegro (Act IV)
9. (Repeat of No. 4)
10. (Repeat of No. 5)

=== Suite ===
The suite was scored for two flutes (2nd doubling piccolo), 1 oboe, 2 clarinets, 2 horns, percussion (bass drum, cymbals, tambourine, triangle) and strings.

1. Oriental March (originally Alla marcia)
2. Solitude (originally The Jewish Girl's Song)
3. Nocturne (originally Prelude: Notturno)
4. Khadra's Dance (originally Dance of Life and Dance of Death).

== Additional reading ==
- Kurki, Eija (2018). "Belshazzar's Feast and The Lizard: Exoticism, Snake Dances, Violin Playing and Ghosts". SibeliusOne.com. Sibelius One.
