= Symphony No. 6 (Sibelius) =

Symphony in four movements by Jean Sibelius

- by Jean Sibelius
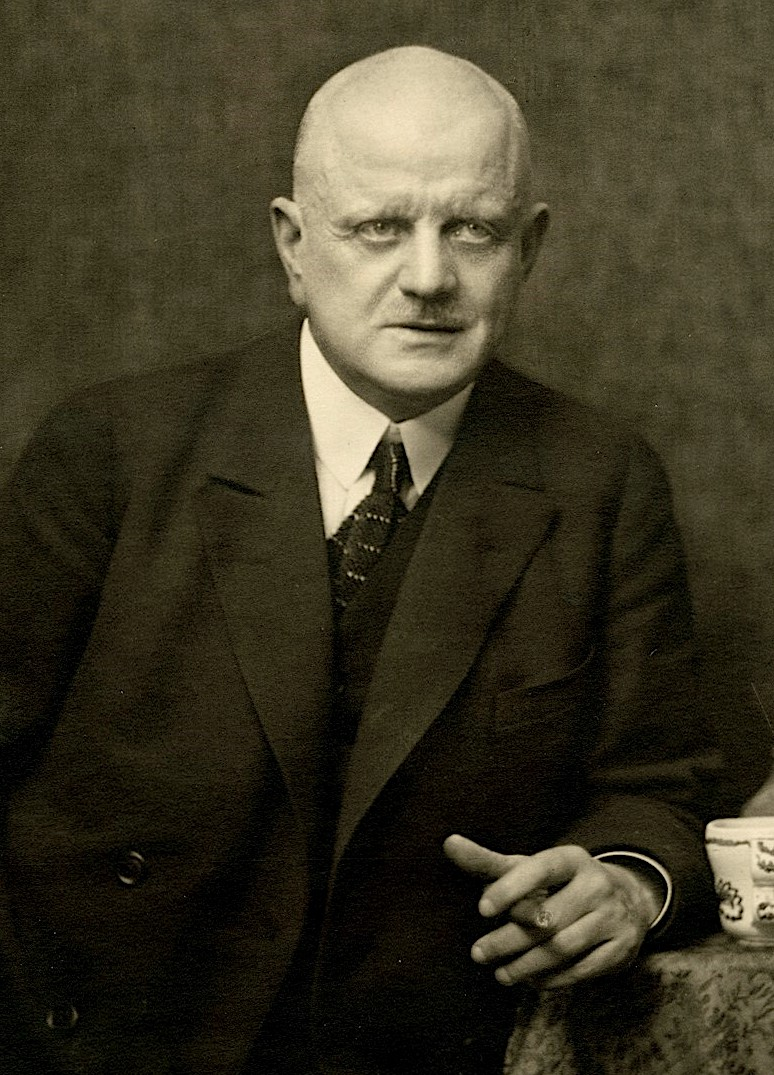
- The composer (c. 1923)
- Key: D minor
- Opus: 104
- Composed: 1914–1923
- Publisher: Hirsch (1924)
- Duration: 27 mins.
- Movements: 4

Premiere
- Date: 19 February 1923
- Location: Helsinki, Finland
- Conductor: Jean Sibelius
- Performers: Helsinki Philharmonic Orchestra

The Symphony No. 6 in D minor, Op. 104, is a four-movement work for orchestra written from 1914 to 1923 by the Finnish composer Jean Sibelius.

Although the score does not contain a key attribution, the symphony is usually described as being in D minor; much of it is in fact in the (modern) Dorian mode, a scale that corresponds to a scale on the white keys on a piano starting on the note D. A typical performance lasts about 27 minutes. The composer called the work "cold spring water" in opposition to many contemporary "cocktails"—a reference to the modernist gestures in post-war music. The symphony was premiered by the Helsinki Philharmonic Orchestra, conducted by the composer, on 19 February 1923 and had other performances under his direction in the following months.

== Background ==
The last three symphonies by Sibelius abandon traditional development and are more a matter of structured emotional urges; in the words of a 1912 diary entry, "I intend to let the musical thoughts and their development determine their own form in my soul." This was echoed in his interview in the Svenska Dagbladet after a performance of the Sixth in Stockholm in March 1923: "I do not think of a symphony only as music in this or that number of bars, but rather as an expression of a spiritual creed, a phase in one's inner life." Although the symphony was completed only in 1923, musical ideas incorporated into it were being developed in his notebooks from 1914 onward, at the same time as he was also working on his Fifth Symphony; by 1918 it was taking more definite form, when he was working on the Seventh as well. By January 1923 his diary notes the final completion of the first three movements of the Sixth. He conducted the premiere on 19 February of that year.

The symphony was dedicated to his Swedish musical advocate, the composer and conductor Wilhelm Stenhammar.

== Instrumentation ==
The Sixth Symphony is scored for the following instruments, organized by family (woodwinds, brass, percussion, and strings):

- 2 flutes, 2 oboes, 2 clarinets (in B♭), 1 bass clarinet (in B♭), and 2 bassoons
- 4 horns (in F), 3 trumpets (in B♭), and 3 trombones
- Timpani
- Violins (I and II), violas, cellos, double basses, and harp

== Structure ==
External audio
- Performed by the Berlin Philharmonic under Herbert von Karajan
- I. Allegro molto moderato
- II. Allegretto moderato
- III. Poco vivace
- IV. Allegro molto

The symphony has four movements:

1. Allegro molto moderato (in Dorian mode on D)
2. Allegretto moderato (in Dorian mode on G)
3. Poco vivace (in Dorian mode on D)
4. Allegro molto (in Dorian mode on D—ends in Aeolian mode on D)

== Reception ==
After the premiere, the symphony was described in the press as "a poem within the framework of a symphony". Sibelius himself once remarked that it "always reminds me of the scent of the first snow". In terms of the nature mysticism present in the works of Sibelius' final period, one commentator finds that the finale suggests “a kind of elemental archetype: a natural cycle rising to a peak... then declining into extinction, in the manner, perhaps, of a day, a season, a year, or a person’s life.”

Because of its quiet qualities and the uncertainty of its key attribution, the Sixth has been described as "the Cinderella of the seven symphonies". But like the poor sister, its unassuming qualities grow on the listener. As they did, for example, for Benjamin Britten, converting him from a fixation on the avant-garde composers who influenced him when younger. It has also been claimed that one of the influences on the symphony was Giovanni Pierluigi da Palestrina, whose music the young Sibelius had studied.

The first commercial recording of the Sixth Symphony was made by Georg Schnéevoigt with the Finnish National Orchestra on 8 June 1934 for His Master's Voice's Sibelius Society.

== Bibliography ==
- Abraham, Gerald. 1947. "The Symphonies". In The Music of Sibelius, edited by Gerald Abraham. New York: W. W. Norton. British edition, as Sibelius: A Symposium. London: L. Drummond, 1948.
- Barnett, Andrew, Sibelius, Yale University 2007, pp.299–303
- Dahlström, Fabian [in Swedish] (2003). Jean Sibelius: Thematisch-bibliographisches Verzeichnis seiner Werke [Jean Sibelius: A Thematic Bibliographic Index of His Works] (in German). Wiesbaden: Breitkopf & Härtel. ISBN 3-7651-0333-0.
- Hepokoski, James, “Rotations, sketches and the Sixth Symphony”, Sibelius Studies, Cambridge University 2001, pp.322–51
- Pike, Lionel. 1974. "Sibelius's Debt to Renaissance Polyphony". Music & Letters 55, no. 3 (July): 317–26.
- Pike, Lionel. 2001. "Tonality and Modality in Sibelius's Sixth Symphony". Tempo new series, no. 216 (April): 6–16.
- "Sixth symphony op. 104 (1923)", Article at official Sibelius website
