= Symphony No. 1 (Sibelius) =

Symphony in four movements by Jean Sibelius

- by Jean Sibelius
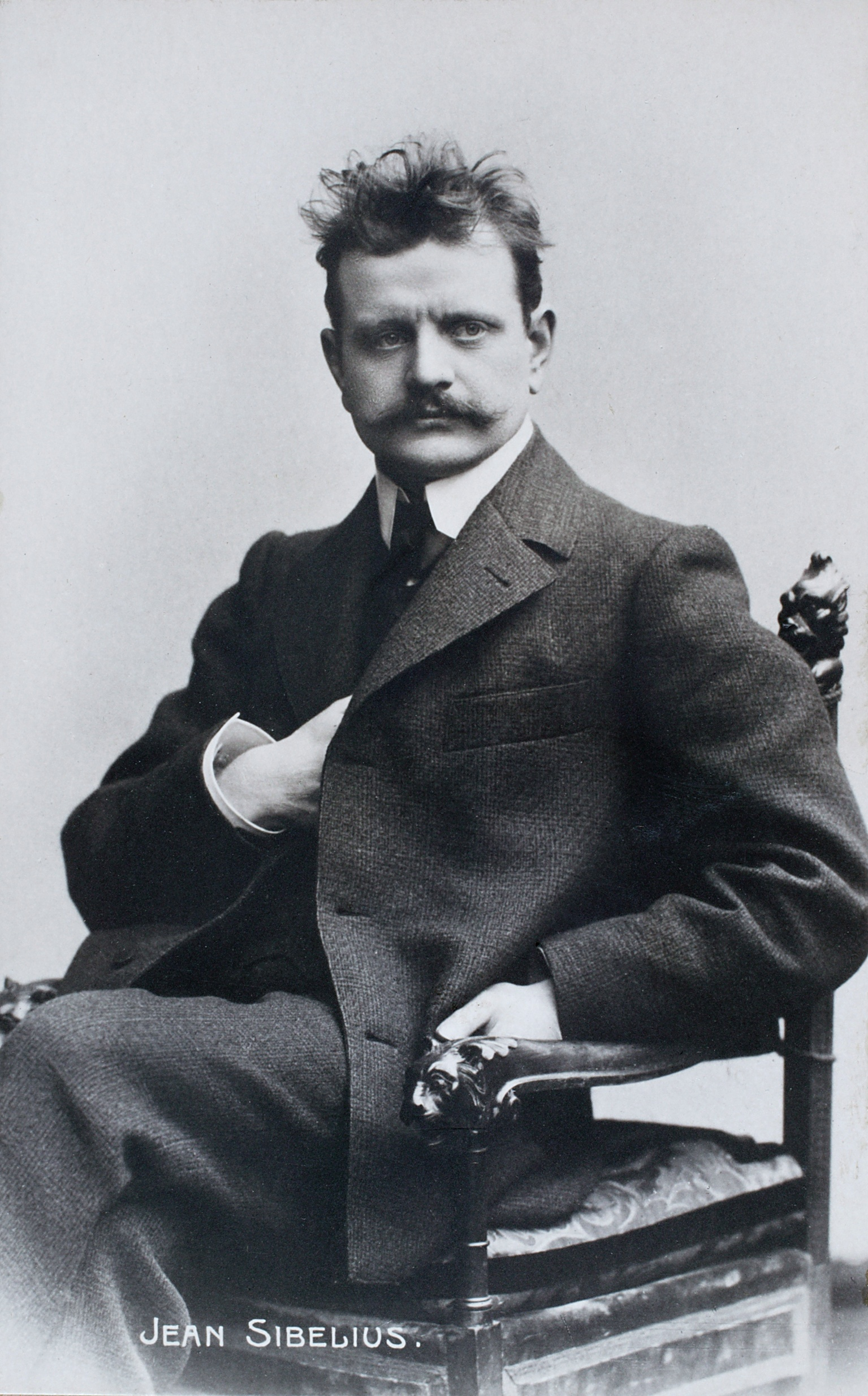
- The composer (c. 1900)
- Key: E minor
- Opus: 39
- Composed: 1898–1899, rev. 1900
- Publisher: Fazer & Westerlund (1902) (Note: On 20 July 1905, the Helsinki-based music publisher Fazer & Westerlund (Helsingfors Nya Musikhandel) sold its Sibelius holdings (the publishing rights and printing plates) to the German firm of Breitkopf & Härtel.)
- Duration: 38 mins.
- Movements: 4

Premiere
- Date: 26 April 1899
- Location: Helsinki, Grand Duchy of Finland
- Conductor: Jean Sibelius
- Performers: Helsinki Philharmonic Society

The Symphony No. 1 in E minor, Op. 39, is a four-movement work for orchestra written from 1898 to 1899 by the Finnish composer Jean Sibelius.

The work was first performed on 26 April 1899 by the Helsinki Orchestral Society, conducted by the composer, in an original version which has not survived. After the premiere, Sibelius made some revisions, resulting in the version performed today. The revised version was completed in the spring and summer of 1900, and was first performed in Berlin by the Helsinki Philharmonic, conducted by Robert Kajanus on 1 July 1900, as the German premiere. The British premiere was on 13 October 1903 at the Promenade Concerts, conducted by Henry Wood.

The symphony is characterized by its use of string and woodwind solos; the first movement opens with a long and discursive clarinet solo over a timpani roll; (this idea returns at the start of the fourth movement, fortissimo in the strings, with wind and brass chordal accompaniment), and subsequent movements include violin and cello solos.

Most performances of the work last between 35 and 40 minutes. Many conductors choose to slacken the speeds suggested by Sibelius's metronome markings, particularly in the fast part (allegro energico) of the first movement. Because of this, many versions of the symphony are about 38–40 minutes long (the publishers suggest the duration is 40 minutes).

== Instrumentation ==
The First Symphony is scored for the following instruments, organized by family (woodwinds, brass, percussion, and strings):

- 2 flutes (each doubling piccolo), 2 oboes, 2 clarinets (in A for Movements I and IV; in B♭ for Movements II–III), and 2 bassoons
- 4 horns (in F), 3 trumpets (in F), 3 trombones, and tuba
- Timpani, bass drum, cymbals, and triangle
- Violins (I and II), violas, cellos, double basses, and harp

== Movements ==
External audio
- Performed by the San Francisco Symphony under Herbert Blomstedt
- I. Andante, ma non troppo – Allegro energico
- II. Andante (ma non troppo lento)
- III. Scherzo (Allegro)
- IV. Finale (Quasi una fantasia)

Like most symphonies, it is in four movements:

1. Andante, ma non troppo – Allegro energico (. = 108) in E minor and sonata form with introduction
  This movement starts with a clarinet solo, stating all the basic themes and motifs of the symphony.
2. Andante (ma non troppo lento) ( = 54) in E♭ major and ternary form, variation form
  Similarly to the second movement of Sibelius's Symphony No. 2, the slow movement starts quietly, with tragic themes. It then expands into a large and furious passage, followed by a return to the original themes, ending calmly.
3. Scherzo: Allegro (. = 108) in C major and scherzo and trio form
  Like the third movement of Symphony No. 2, this fast movement is not light in tone. It ends with stretto and ends incompletely.
4. Finale (Quasi una fantasia): Andante – Allegro molto – Andante assai – Allegro molto come prima – Andante (ma non troppo) in E minor and fantasia-like with an orchestrated introduction from the first movement
  This movement contains a number of tones that lead to a rumbling effect due to intermodulation distortion. It starts with a serious and emotional strings unison with brass strikes, using the introduction from the first movement, then soon proceeds into a fantasia with nearly free form.

== Discography ==
The Finnish composer Robert Kajanus and the London Symphony Orchestra (credited as the "Symphony Orchestra" for contractual reasons) made the world premiere studio recording of the First Symphony on 21–23 May 1930 at Westminster Central Hall, for the Columbia Graphophone Company (Columbia LX 65/69, 1931). (Two years later, in 1932, the British record producer Walter Legge founded the His Master's Voice Sibelius Society, a subscription service that promised to record "all his [Sibelius's] major works and to culminate in the forthcoming Eighth Symphony". Kajanus's pioneering recording of the First Symphony was incorporated retroactively into this cycle.)
