= Symphony No. 3 (Sibelius) =

Symphony in three movements by Jean Sibelius

- by Jean Sibelius
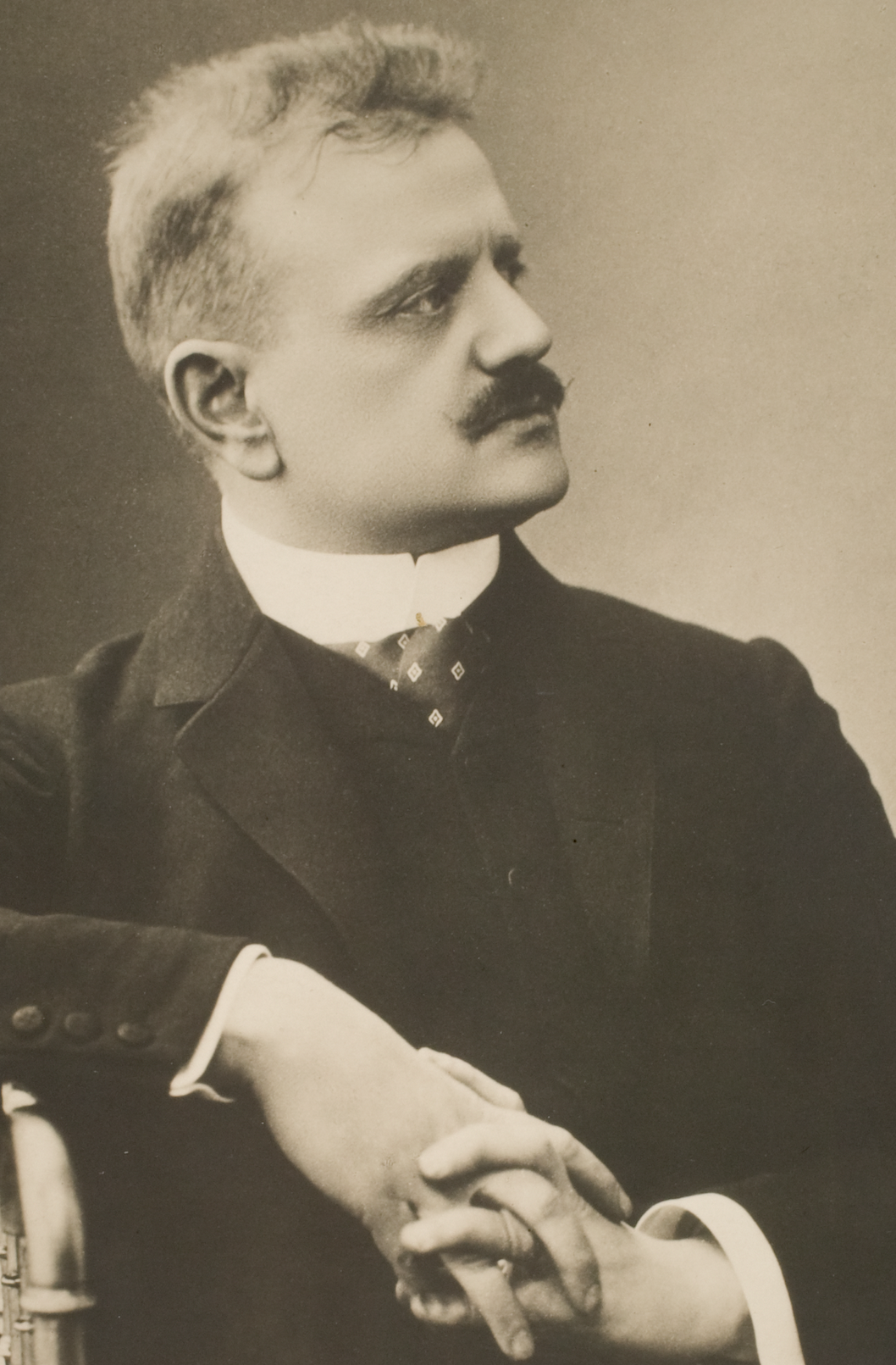
- The composer (c. 1905)
- Key: C major
- Opus: 52
- Composed: 1904–1907
- Publisher: Lienau (1907)
- Duration: 29 mins.
- Movements: 3

Premiere
- Date: 25 September 1907
- Location: Helsinki, Grand Duchy of Finland
- Conductor: Jean Sibelius
- Performers: Helsinki Philharmonic Society

The Symphony No. 3 in C major, Op. 52, is a three-movement work for orchestra written from 1904 to 1907 by the Finnish composer Jean Sibelius.

Coming between the romantic intensity of Sibelius's first two symphonies and the more austere complexity of his later symphonies, it is a good-natured, triumphal, and deceptively simple-sounding piece. The symphony's first performance was given by the Helsinki Philharmonic Society, conducted by the composer, on 25 September 1907. In the same concert, his suite from the incidental music to Belshazzar's Feast, Op. 51, was also performed for the first time. It is dedicated to the British composer Granville Bantock, an early champion of his work in the UK.

The first recording featured the Finnish conductor Robert Kajanus and the London Symphony Orchestra, for the His Master's Voice label in June 1932.

== Composition ==
The Third Symphony represents a turning point in Sibelius's symphonic output. His First and Second symphonies are grandiose Romantic and patriotic works. The Third, however, shows a distinct, almost Classical desire to contain the largest amount of musical material in the fewest possible melodic figures, harmonies, and durations. This musical economy is most apparent in the first movement, almost reminiscent of Beethoven in its clear and cleanly developed sections. A typical performance of the whole symphony runs slightly under 30 minutes.

== Instrumentation ==
The Third Symphony is scored for the following instruments, organized by family (woodwinds, brass, percussion, and strings):

- 2 flutes, 2 oboes, 2 clarinets (in B♭ for Movements I and III; in A for Movement II), and 2 bassoons
- 4 horns (in F), 2 trumpets (in B♭), and 3 trombones
- Timpani
- Violins (I and II), violas, cellos, and double basses

== Movements ==
External audio
- Performed by the San Francisco Symphony under Herbert Blomstedt
- I. Allegro moderato
- II. Andantino con moto, quasi allegretto
- III. Moderato – Allegro (ma non tanto)

1. Allegro moderato (in C major)
2. Andantino con moto, quasi allegretto (in G♯ minor)
3. Moderato – Allegro ma non tanto (in C major)

=== I. Allegro moderato ===
The symphony opens with a strident and rhythmic melody in the celli and double basses, after the announcement of which the brass and the remaining strings enter in turn. The C–F♯ tritone, which plays such an important role in both this and the next symphony, is clearly articulated and emphasised as early as the beginning of bar 15 by a rinforzando marking.

A lilting, almost folk-like flute solo gives way to a horn call over brush-like strings in the first of three major climaxes in the first movement.

After this rush of sound, the gentle serenity of the opening is recalled by the celli once again, but this time in a more vulnerable and sostenuto manner in the more remote key of B minor.

From this point, the music gently winds down. Then, a succession of woodwind instruments recall the second cello melody over soft string scales, which repeatedly recall the opening of the movement. The tension grows and finally explodes into the opening theme, underscored by timpani, the violins playing over a pulsating cushion of brass-and-woodwind chorales and offbeat pizzicatos in the cellos. The flute theme is once again recalled, and the second cello theme is re-stated by the entire orchestra; played in the string section, the timpani and woodwind provide rhythmic material while more brass chorales are sustained throughout the section.

The music once again winds down, but this time, before it is let go completely, a flute and horn chorale lead into more recollections of past themes, before the movement closes with two two-chord plagal cadences in E minor (a chord of A minor followed by a chord of E minor), which, because there is no F in either chord, leave the F–F♯ dichotomy (set up by the C–F♯ tritone near the beginning of the work) unresolved;

this dichotomy is then finally resolved (for the time-being) by a single plagal cadence in C (F major, then C major).

=== II. Andantino con moto, quasi allegretto ===
The opening of the second movement is a nocturne. The first section almost waltzes out of the pervading darkness, but, in a constrained manner, the music refuses to do so.

Commentators disagree over exactly what form the structure of this movement represents; however the four appearances of the theme with developmental episodes suggest a kind of rondo. After the extended introduction, a brief moment of lightness gives way to the string section taking over the theme, with comments from woodwinds and horns. The music is propelled to the end by perpetual cello pizzicatos, and then the second movement ends in several string pulses in which the tune is still almost recognizable.

=== III. Moderato ===
The last movement is really two movements compacted into a single finale. Sibelius described it as "the crystallisation of ideas from chaos". The opening contains thematic fragments from previous material and of material yet to come.

A hushed, tense scherzo breaks into a chorale (with a prominent C–F♯ tritone) which is repeated several times.

The coda brings the chorale-type theme into greater and greater expanses, until the symphony concludes in a compendium of the chorale theme and a rush of string figures and woodwind scales. The cadence brings the piece to an almost abrupt halt with a single, arpeggiated C major triad in the brass.
