= The Bard (Sibelius) =

Tone poem by Jean Sibelius

- Tone poem by Jean Sibelius
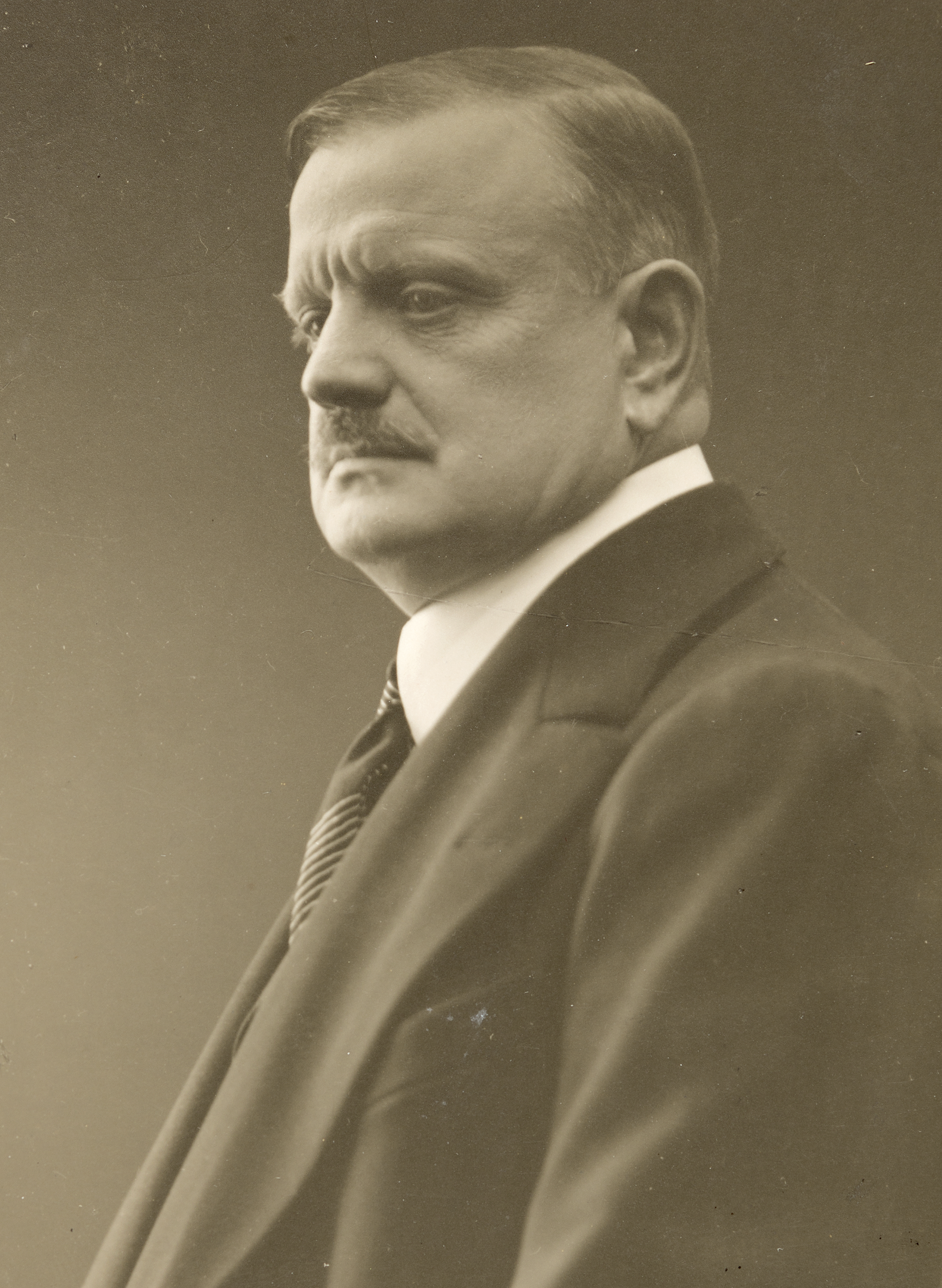
- The composer (c. 1911)
- Native name: Barden
- Opus: 64
- Composed: 1913, rev. 1913
- Publisher: Breitkopf & Härtel (1914)
- Duration: 8 mins.

Premiere
- Date: 27 March 1913
- Location: Helsinki, Grand Duchy of Finland
- Conductor: Jean Sibelius
- Performers: Helsinki Philharmonic Society

The Bard (in Swedish: Barden), Op. 64, tone poem for orchestra written in 1913 by the Finnish composer Jean Sibelius. It was first performed in Helsinki on 27 March 1913 by the Philharmonic Society Orchestra, conducted by the composer himself, but he revised it in 1914. The new version was first performed in Helsinki on 9 January 1916, again under the baton of the composer.

In Britain, Adrian Boult and the BBC Symphony Orchestra recorded the tone poem in January 1936 for broadcast. The first public performance in the UK was given by Sir Thomas Beecham in 1938.

The tone poem itself provides a profound, yet cryptic glimpse of an elegiac, poetic world: an initial, harp-led stillness and reflection are succeeded by elemental, eruptive surges and, finally, a sense of renunciation or maybe death.

== Instrumentation ==
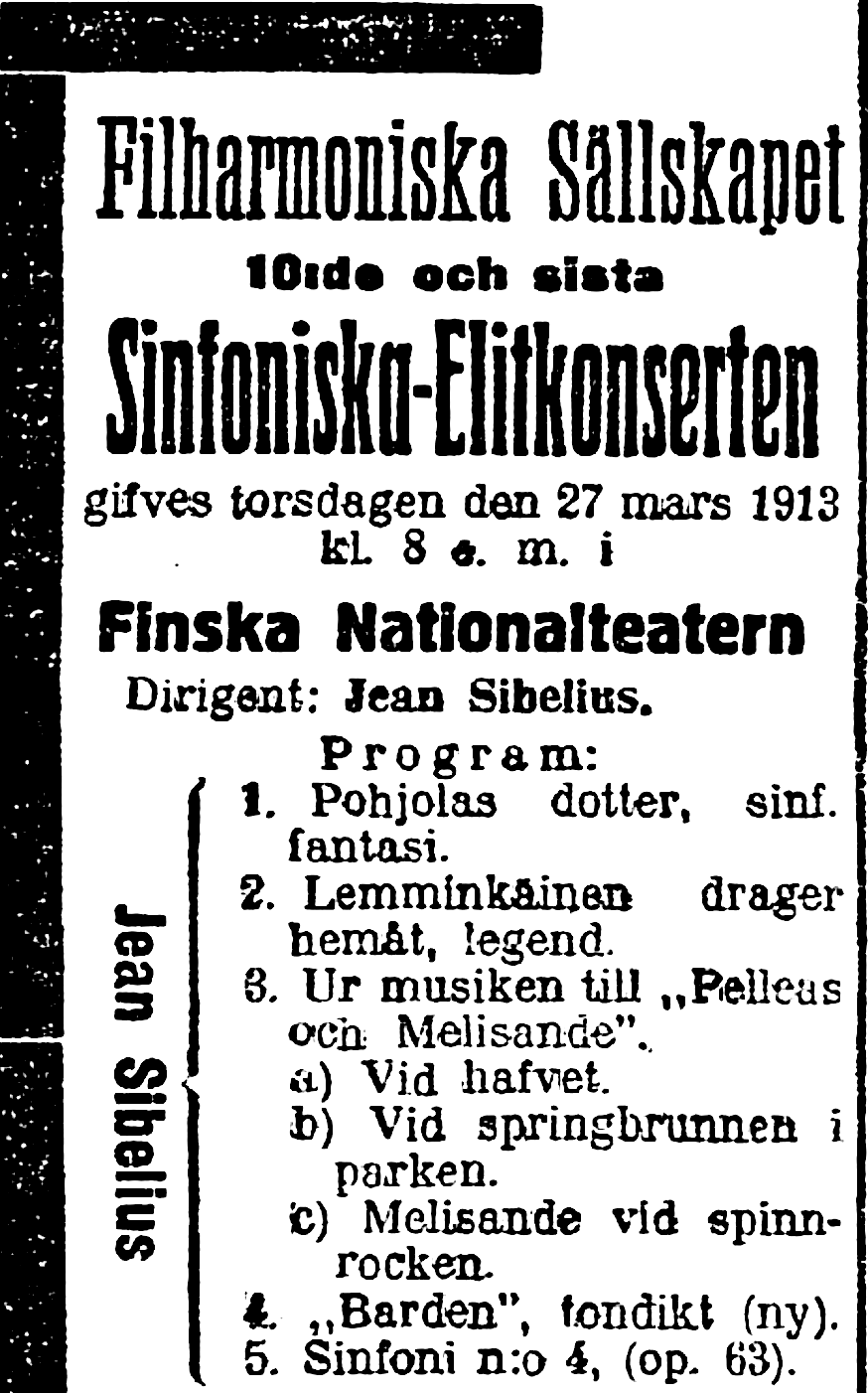
A 27 March 1913 advertisement from Hufvudstadsbladet promoting the premiere of Sibelius's The Bard

The Bard is scored for the following instruments, organized by family (woodwinds, brass, percussion, and strings):

- 2 flutes, 2 oboes, 2 clarinets (in B♭), 1 bass clarinet (in B♭), (Note: Dahlström (2003) does not list bass clarinet among the instruments for The Bard. This is clearly an omission, as the score indicates "Baßklarinette" on page one, in addition to the two clarinetists. Moreover, the part for bass clarinet is available on IMSLP.) and 2 bassoons
- 4 horns (in F), 2 trumpets (in B♭), and 3 trombones
- Timpani, bass drum, and tam-tam
- Violins (I and II), violas, cellos, double basses, and harp

== Discography ==
The sortable table below contains this and other commercially available recordings of The Bard:

No.	Conductor	Ensemble	Rec. (Note: Refers to the year in which the performers recorded the work; this may not be the same as the year in which the recording was first released to the general public.)	Time	Recording venue	Label	Ref.
1	Sir Thomas Beecham	London Philharmonic Orchestra (1)	1938	7:10	Abbey Road Studio No. 1	Naxos Historical	(Note: T. Beecham–Naxos Historical (8.110867) 2003)
2	Sir Adrian Boult	London Philharmonic Orchestra (2)	1956	6:07	Walthamstow Town Hall	Omega Classics	
3	Sir Alexander Gibson (1)	Royal Scottish National Orchestra (1)	1966	7:42	Abbey Road Studio No. 1	EMI Classics	
4	Okko Kamu (2)	Finnish Radio Symphony Orchestra (1)	1972	6:51	"Concert Hall", Helsinki (Note: Given the recording date, "Concert Hall" probably refers to the then-newly completed Finlandia Hall, which opened in 1971 and became the Finnish Radio Symphony Orchestra's main venue.)	Deutsche Grammophon	(Note: O. Kamu–Deutsche Grammophon (453 610–2) 1996)
5	Paavo Berglund	Bournemouth Symphony Orchestra	1976	8:14	Southampton Guildhall	EMI Classics	(Note: P. Berglund–EMI Classics (7243 5 69773 2 7) 1997)
6	Sir Alexander Gibson (2)	Royal Scottish National Orchestra (2)	1977	7:42	Glasgow City Halls	Chandos	(Note: A. Gibson–Chandos (CHAN 8395/6) 1985)
7	Neeme Järvi (1)	Gothenburg Symphony Orchestra (1)	1986	8:02	Gothenburg Concert Hall	BIS	(Note: N. Järvi–BIS (CD–384) 1988)
8	Jukka-Pekka Saraste	Finnish Radio Symphony Orchestra (2)	1988	7:28	Kulttuuritalo	RCA Red Seal	(Note: J. Saraste–RCA (19439704812) 2020)
9	Vassily Sinaisky	Moscow Philharmonic Orchestra	1991	7:04	Mosfilm Studios	Brilliant Classics	(Note: V. Sinaisky–Brilliant Classics (BC9212) 2010)
10	Neeme Järvi (2)	Gothenburg Symphony Orchestra (2)	1994	6:53	Gothenburg Concert Hall	Deutsche Grammophon	(Note: N. Järvi–DG (477 6654) 2007)
11	Sir Colin Davis	London Symphony Orchestra	2000	7:57	Watford Town Hall	RCA Red Seal	(Note: C. Davis–RCA Red Seal (82876–55706–2) 2003)
12	Petri Sakari	Iceland Symphony Orchestra	2000	8:07	[unknown venue], Reykjavík	Naxos	(Note: P. Sakari–Naxos (8.555299) 2002)
13	Osmo Vänskä	Lahti Symphony Orchestra (2)	2000	7:32	Sibelius Hall	BIS	(Note: O. Vänskä–BIS (CD–1225) 2002)
14	Sakari Oramo	City of Birmingham Symphony Orchestra	2001	7:58	Symphony Hall	Erato, Warner Classics	(Note: S. Oramo–Erato (2564 60294-2) 2003)
15	John Storgårds	Helsinki Philharmonic Orchestra	2010	8:08	Finlandia Hall	Ondine	(Note: J. Storgårds–Ondine (ODE 1147–2) 2010)
16	Okko Kamu (2)	Lahti Symphony Orchestra (2)	2011	7:01	Sibelius Hall	BIS	(Note: O. Kamu–BIS (SACD–1945) 2011)
