= Hämeenlinna Normal Lyceum =

The Hämeenlinna Normal Lyceum (Finnish: Hämeenlinnan normaalilyseo) was the first Finnish-language normal school in Finland. Its notable alumni include the composer Jean Sibelius and President Juho Kusti Paasikivi.
