= Op. 19 =

In music, Op. 19 stands for Opus number 19. Compositions that are assigned this number include:

- Barber – Symphony No. 2
- Bartók – The Miraculous Mandarin
- Beethoven – Piano Concerto No. 2
- Castelnuovo-Tedesco - Cantico
- Chausson – Poème de l'amour et de la mer
- Chopin – Boléro
- Dohnányi – Suite in F-sharp minor
- Elgar – Froissart Overture
- Fauré - Ballade in F-sharp major
- Kabalevsky – Symphony No. 2
- Kahn - Piano Trio No. 1
- Kosenko – Eleven Études in the Form of Old Dances
- Larsson – Pastoral Suite (Pastoralsvit), for orchestra (1938)
- Lindblad - Symphony No. 1 in C-major
- Mendelssohn - Songs without Words, Book I
- Mosolov – Iron Foundry
- Prokofiev – Violin Concerto No. 1
- Rachmaninoff – Cello Sonata
- Ries – Violin Sonata No. 10
- Schoenberg – Sechs kleine Klavierstücke
- Schumann – Blumenstück
- Sibelius – Impromptu, for female choir and orchestra (1902, revised 1910)
- Stenhammar - Violin Sonata in A-minor
- Szymanowski – Symphony No. 2
- Weber – Symphony No. 1
