= Impromptu (disambiguation) =

Impromptu is a musical form or genre.

Impromptu may also refer to:

== Films ==
- Impromptu (1932 film), a comedy short starring Richard Bird and Florence Desmond
- Impromptu (1991 film), a movie starring Hugh Grant as Chopin
- Impromptu (2013 film), a Canadian animated short film by Bruce Alcock

== Music ==
- Impromptu (June Christy album), a 1977 album by June Christy
- Impromptu (Billy Taylor album), a 1962 album by jazz pianist Billy Taylor
- Impromptu (Sibelius), a choral composition
- Impromptus (Schubert)
- "Impromptu", a song by Beggars Opera from the album Waters of Change, 1971

== Other uses ==
- Impromptu (programming environment), a Scheme-based live programming environment
- Impromptu speaking
- Impromptu, a 1923 novel by Elliot Paul
