= List of compositions by Viktor Kosenko =

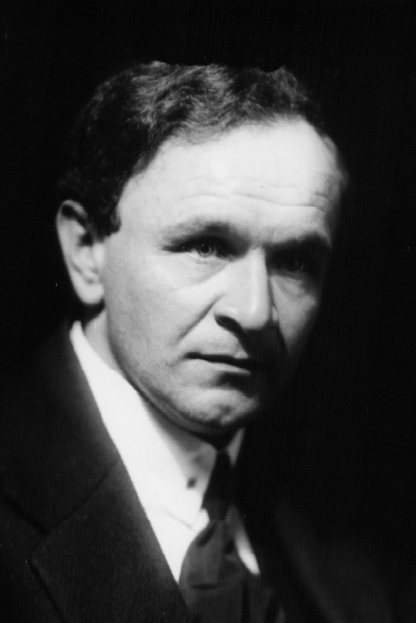
Kosenko in c. 1934

This is a list of compositions by Viktor Kosenko, who composed about 250 works in various genres. His piano music may be considered post-romantic, containing eclectic elements of musical nationalism. Although a particular folk song has never been directly cited in his work, his melodic and harmonic lines are definitely associated with Ukrainian folk songs, and also with the Dorian, Lydian, and Phrygian mode used extensively in his compositions. Kosenko left a dozen works that are included in the hall of Ukrainian piano music. Among these are his Eleven Études in the Form of Old Dances, Op. 19, and Twenty-four Pieces for Children, Op. 25, which grew generations of young pianists. After his death, many of his other works, if not in manuscript, have been published only recently.

Both tables (works with and without opus number) are sortable by title, key, tempo and mood markings (if applicable), year of production or publishing (when applicable), and non-sortable by opus number (some do not have one), name, image (scores), genre, notes and references. This line _____ functions as a chronological divider for three parts of Kosenko's life (his early works, the time he spent in Zhytomir, and the one spent in Kiev) when his compositions are sorted by year.

== Genres ==
Piano solo
Vocal music
Chamber music
Orchestra
Play score
Opera
Film score
Folk arrangement
Choral music

=== Works with opus number ===
Title	Opus	Name	Key	Tempo	Im	Ge	Year	No	Re
Three Preludes for Piano	1	No. 7	F♯ minor	Largo ma non troppo	–		1910	(Note: Prelude → Prelude No. 7 has never been published and the original score is kept at the manuscript department of the Vernadsky National Library of Ukraine. The existence of an original score where Prelude No. 1 in F♯ minor goes accompanied with the inscription No. 7 may imply that the three preludes in question here have been gathered under a single title by the publisher.)	
Three Preludes for Piano	1	No. 8	C♯ minor	Andante	–		1915	(Note: Prelude → Prelude No. 7 has never been published and the original score is kept at the manuscript department of the Vernadsky National Library of Ukraine. The existence of an original score where Prelude No. 1 in F♯ minor goes accompanied with the inscription No. 7 may imply that the three preludes in question here have been gathered under a single title by the publisher.)	
Three Preludes for Piano	1	No. 9	G minor	Lento	–		1915	(Note: Prelude → Prelude No. 7 has never been published and the original score is kept at the manuscript department of the Vernadsky National Library of Ukraine. The existence of an original score where Prelude No. 1 in F♯ minor goes accompanied with the inscription No. 7 may imply that the three preludes in question here have been gathered under a single title by the publisher.)	
Four Romances for Voice and Piano	1 bis	No. 1	—	—	–		1916	(Note: Song → These compositions were written during the time that Kosenko was still a student in the Saint Petersburg Conservatory. Romances No. 1, No. 2 and No. 3 remain in manuscript. Romance No. 4 was written over verses by Konstantin Balmont.)	
Four Romances for Voice and Piano	1 bis	No. 2	—	—	–		1916	(Note: Song → These compositions were written during the time that Kosenko was still a student in the Saint Petersburg Conservatory. Romances No. 1, No. 2 and No. 3 remain in manuscript. Romance No. 4 was written over verses by Konstantin Balmont.)	
Four Romances for Voice and Piano	1 bis	No. 3	—	—	–		1917	(Note: Song → These compositions were written during the time that Kosenko was still a student in the Saint Petersburg Conservatory. Romances No. 1, No. 2 and No. 3 remain in manuscript. Romance No. 4 was written over verses by Konstantin Balmont.)	
Four Romances for Voice and Piano	1 bis	Wandering Wind	C♯ minor	Allegro moderato			1917	(Note: Song → These compositions were written during the time that Kosenko was still a student in the Saint Petersburg Conservatory. Romances No. 1, No. 2 and No. 3 remain in manuscript. Romance No. 4 was written over verses by Konstantin Balmont.)	
Four Preludes for Piano	2	—	E♭ minor	Largo			1911	(Note: Prelude → All four preludes were written in minor keys. A strong influence of Scriabin's second period can be heard here, not only in its chromaticism but also as for the use of unstable intervals and dissonant harmonies. Only prelude No. 1 was published, the other three pieces remain in manuscript.)	
Four Preludes for Piano	2	—	G minor	Quasi andantino	–		1911	(Note: Prelude → All four preludes were written in minor keys. A strong influence of Scriabin's second period can be heard here, not only in its chromaticism but also as for the use of unstable intervals and dissonant harmonies. Only prelude No. 1 was published, the other three pieces remain in manuscript.)	
Four Preludes for Piano	2	—	G♯ minor	—	–		1911	(Note: Prelude → All four preludes were written in minor keys. A strong influence of Scriabin's second period can be heard here, not only in its chromaticism but also as for the use of unstable intervals and dissonant harmonies. Only prelude No. 1 was published, the other three pieces remain in manuscript.)	
Four Preludes for Piano	2	—	B minor	Drammatico	–		1915	(Note: Prelude → All four preludes were written in minor keys. A strong influence of Scriabin's second period can be heard here, not only in its chromaticism but also as for the use of unstable intervals and dissonant harmonies. Only prelude No. 1 was published, the other three pieces remain in manuscript.)	
Three Mazurkas	3	—	F♯ minor	Moderato			1916	(Note: Mazurka A composition of Kosenko's early career where his music still sounds pretty much Chopinesque. Three Mazurkas, Op. 3 is among Kosenko's best known works.)	
Three Mazurkas	3	—	D♭ major	Quasi allegretto			1920	(Note: Mazurka A composition of Kosenko's early career where his music still sounds pretty much Chopinesque. Three Mazurkas, Op. 3 is among Kosenko's best known works.)	
Three Mazurkas	3	—	C♯ minor	Lento ma non troppo			1922–23	(Note: Mazurka A composition of Kosenko's early career where his music still sounds pretty much Chopinesque. Three Mazurkas, Op. 3 is among Kosenko's best known works.)	
Minuet for Piano	3 bis	—	—	—	–		1919	(Note: Minuet A loose composition written in 1919.)	
Minuet for Piano	3 bis	—	E minor	Allegretto			1919	(Note: Minuet A loose composition written in 1919.)	
Nocturne-Fantasia for Piano	4	—	C♯ minor	Quasi andantino			1919	(Note: Nocturne-Fantasia A composition much influenced by the works of Chopin.)	
Two Pieces for Violin and Piano	4 bis	Dreams	E minor	Lento cantabile	–		1919	(Note: Morceau → Duo for violin and piano.)	
Two Pieces for Violin and Piano	4 bis	Impromptu	A minor	Allegro vivace	–		1919	(Note: Morceau → Duo for violin and piano.)	
Three Pieces for Piano	5	—	B minor	Allegro assai			1915–22	(Note: Morceau → Poem No. 2 is in manuscript. No. 3 is entitled "Exhortation (Appeal), and has Molto Agitato for tempo marking written on the original score.")	
Three Pieces for Piano	5	—	F major	Lento	–		1915	(Note: Morceau → Poem No. 2 is in manuscript. No. 3 is entitled "Exhortation (Appeal), and has Molto Agitato for tempo marking written on the original score.")	
Three Pieces for Piano	5	—	B♭ major	Allegro agitato con festivita			1915	(Note: Morceau → Poem No. 2 is in manuscript. No. 3 is entitled "Exhortation (Appeal), and has Molto Agitato for tempo marking written on the original score.")	
Concerto for Violin and Orchestra	6	—	A minor	—	–		1919	(Note: Concerto → One of Kosenko's two concertos, for violin (1919) and piano (1928).)	
Twelve Romances for Voice and Piano	7	Neither Comment, Nor Words	—	—	–		1921	(Note: Song → A composition part of Kosenko's cycles of romances on verses of Russian and Ukrainian writers such as Fyodor Tyutchev, Pavlo Tychyna, etc. Songs No. 1, No. 4, and No. 5, for bass and piano, No. 6, and No. 8 (manuscript), were written to the verses of Alexander Pushkin, being that song No. 6 'Berceuse' was later transcribed for piano solo by Aleksandr Iokheles. Song No. 2, for soprano and piano, was written to the verses of Viktor Strazhev. Song No. 3, for soprano and piano, to the verses of W. Zalizniak. Song No. 7, for soprano and piano, to the verses of Alexander Blok, being it later also concert-transcribed for piano solo by Aleksandr Iokheles. Song No. 9 to the verses of P. Beranże. Song No. 10, for mezzo-soprano and piano, to the poem Otchego (1840) of Mikhail Lermontov, having this text also been used by composers Mily Balakirev, Aleksandr Dargomyzhsky, Alexander Krein, and Nikolai Rimsky-Korsakov. Song No. 11 was written to the verses of Vladimir Sergeieevich Likhachev (1849-1910), and song No. 12, for mezzo-soprano and piano (manuscript), set to the verses of Arseny Golenishchev-Kutuzov.)	
Twelve Romances for Voice and Piano	7	They Stood in Silence	—	—	–		1921		
Twelve Romances for Voice and Piano	7	Like the Stars in the Sky	—	—	–		1921		
Twelve Romances for Voice and Piano	7	No Pleasing Heart Breathes in There	C minor	Allegro moderato			1921		
Twelve Romances for Voice and Piano	7	I Waited for You	F major	Moderato			1922		
Twelve Romances for Voice and Piano	7	Again in My Soul	E minor	Allegro agitato			1922		
Twelve Romances for Voice and Piano	7	Berceuse	G♯ minor	Andantino cantabile			1921		
Twelve Romances for Voice and Piano	7	Still Nature	—	—	–		1922		
Twelve Romances for Voice and Piano	7	Death of Mother	—	—	–		1922		
Twelve Romances for Voice and Piano	7	I Am Sad	B minor	Lento			1922		
Twelve Romances for Voice and Piano	7	Speak, speak!	G♭ major	Moderato			1922		
Twelve Romances for Voice and Piano	7	Why?	—	—	–		1922		
Twelve Romances for Voice and Piano	7a	Berceuse	Idem	Idem			1921	(Note: Song → Concert transcription of Berceuse arranged for piano solo by A. Iokheles.)	
Eleven Études Romantique	8	—	G♯ minor	Allegro assai			1922	(Note: Étude → Compositions for piano solo. No. 2 is entitled "Melancholy", and No. 11 "May Day Holiday".)	
Eleven Études Romantique	8	—	B♭ minor	Andante			1922	(Note: Étude → Compositions for piano solo. No. 2 is entitled "Melancholy", and No. 11 "May Day Holiday".)	
Eleven Études Romantique	8	—	B minor	Agitato			1922	(Note: Étude → Compositions for piano solo. No. 2 is entitled "Melancholy", and No. 11 "May Day Holiday".)	
Eleven Études Romantique	8	—	D minor	Allegro moderato			1922	(Note: Étude → Compositions for piano solo. No. 2 is entitled "Melancholy", and No. 11 "May Day Holiday".)	
Eleven Études Romantique	8	—	C♯ minor	Presto con fuoco			1922	(Note: Étude → Compositions for piano solo. No. 2 is entitled "Melancholy", and No. 11 "May Day Holiday".)	
Eleven Études Romantique	8	—	B major	Allegretto con tenerezza			1922	(Note: Étude → Compositions for piano solo. No. 2 is entitled "Melancholy", and No. 11 "May Day Holiday".)	
Eleven Études Romantique	8	—	C major	Allegro vivace			1923	(Note: Étude → Compositions for piano solo. No. 2 is entitled "Melancholy", and No. 11 "May Day Holiday".)	
Eleven Études Romantique	8	—	F♯ minor	Moderato			1922	(Note: Étude → Compositions for piano solo. No. 2 is entitled "Melancholy", and No. 11 "May Day Holiday".)	
Eleven Études Romantique	8	—	G♯ minor	Allegro con tanto			1923	(Note: Étude → Compositions for piano solo. No. 2 is entitled "Melancholy", and No. 11 "May Day Holiday".)	
Eleven Études Romantique	8	—	C♯ minor	Andante lugubre			1922	(Note: Étude → Compositions for piano solo. No. 2 is entitled "Melancholy", and No. 11 "May Day Holiday".)	
Eleven Études Romantique	8	—	E major	Allegro maestoso			1922	(Note: Étude → Compositions for piano solo. No. 2 is entitled "Melancholy", and No. 11 "May Day Holiday".)	
Three Pieces for Piano	9	Consolation	B major	Adagio con moto			1921	(Note: Morceau Consolation Op.9 No. 1 was written in 1921 and is by far the most recognizable piece of the three. This composition with four big arpeggios at the end is not quite two pages long, but it is very soothing to listen to.)	
Three Pieces for Piano	9	Mazurka	E♭ minor	Allegretto malinconico			1921	(Note: Morceau Consolation Op.9 No. 1 was written in 1921 and is by far the most recognizable piece of the three. This composition with four big arpeggios at the end is not quite two pages long, but it is very soothing to listen to.)	
Three Pieces for Piano	9	Nocturne	F♯ minor	Quasi andantino			1921	(Note: Morceau Consolation Op.9 No. 1 was written in 1921 and is by far the most recognizable piece of the three. This composition with four big arpeggios at the end is not quite two pages long, but it is very soothing to listen to.)	
Sonata for Cello and Piano	10	—	D minor	Moderato	–		1923	(Note: Sonata → Duo for cello and piano.)	
Sonata for Cello and Piano	10	—	D minor	Andante con moto	–		1923	(Note: Sonata → Duo for cello and piano.)	
Sonata for Cello and Piano	10	—	D minor	Allegro con fuoco	–		1923	(Note: Sonata → Duo for cello and piano.)	
Three Pieces for Piano	11	Poem Désire	C♯ minor	Andante cantabile			1921	(Note: Morceau Poem Tragic is a lost composition which presumably might have been written in C♯ minor like the other two.)	
Three Pieces for Piano	11	Poem Tragic	—	—	–		—	(Note: Morceau Poem Tragic is a lost composition which presumably might have been written in C♯ minor like the other two.)	
Three Pieces for Piano	11	Poem Fantastic	C♯ minor	Allegro assai			1921	(Note: Morceau Poem Tragic is a lost composition which presumably might have been written in C♯ minor like the other two.)	
Two Poem-Legends	12	—	E minor	Con afflizione			1921	(Note: Morceau Two Poem-Legends, Op. 12, is one of Kosenko's best known compositions, having been recorded and performed quite a few times in modern repertoire. The original published score reads 20.XII.1921 (Житомир - 'Zhytomyr.))	
Two Poem-Legends	12	—	E♭ minor	Drammatico			1921	(Note: Morceau Two Poem-Legends, Op. 12, is one of Kosenko's best known compositions, having been recorded and performed quite a few times in modern repertoire. The original published score reads 20.XII.1921 (Житомир - 'Zhytomyr.))	
Sonata for Piano No. 1	13	—	B♭ minor	Allegro moderato			1922	(Note: Sonata → One-movement composition.)	
Sonata for Piano No. 2	14	—	C♯ minor	Andante con moto			1924	(Note: Sonata → Three-movement composition.)	
Sonata for Piano No. 2	14	—	C♯ minor	Moderato assai espressivo			1924	(Note: Sonata → Three-movement composition.)	
Sonata for Piano No. 2	14	—	C♯ minor	Allegro vivo			1924	(Note: Sonata → Three-movement composition.)	
Sonata for Piano No. 3	15	—	F minor	Allegro moderato			1926–29	(Note: Sonata → One-movement composition.)	
Six Romances for Voice and Piano	16	I Want to Mute the Silence	—	—	–		1927	(Note: Song → A composition part of Kosenko's cycle of romances. No. 1 set to the verses of Konstantin Dmitriyevich Balmont, No. 2 and No. 3 to the verses of Fyodor Ivanovich Tyutchev. Song No. 4, for soprano and piano, set to the verses of Nikolay Platonovich Ogarev, No. 5 to the verses of Aleksey Konstantinovich Tolstoy, and No. 6 to the verses of Sergei Alexandrovich Yesenin.)	
Six Romances for Voice and Piano	16	Tears	C♯ minor	Andante moderato			1927	(Note: Song → A composition part of Kosenko's cycle of romances. No. 1 set to the verses of Konstantin Dmitriyevich Balmont, No. 2 and No. 3 to the verses of Fyodor Ivanovich Tyutchev. Song No. 4, for soprano and piano, set to the verses of Nikolay Platonovich Ogarev, No. 5 to the verses of Aleksey Konstantinovich Tolstoy, and No. 6 to the verses of Sergei Alexandrovich Yesenin.)	
Six Romances for Voice and Piano	16	Autumn Evening	D minor	Andantino semplice			1927	(Note: Song → A composition part of Kosenko's cycle of romances. No. 1 set to the verses of Konstantin Dmitriyevich Balmont, No. 2 and No. 3 to the verses of Fyodor Ivanovich Tyutchev. Song No. 4, for soprano and piano, set to the verses of Nikolay Platonovich Ogarev, No. 5 to the verses of Aleksey Konstantinovich Tolstoy, and No. 6 to the verses of Sergei Alexandrovich Yesenin.)	
Six Romances for Voice and Piano	16	Night and Foggy Snowstorm	—	—	–		1927	(Note: Song → A composition part of Kosenko's cycle of romances. No. 1 set to the verses of Konstantin Dmitriyevich Balmont, No. 2 and No. 3 to the verses of Fyodor Ivanovich Tyutchev. Song No. 4, for soprano and piano, set to the verses of Nikolay Platonovich Ogarev, No. 5 to the verses of Aleksey Konstantinovich Tolstoy, and No. 6 to the verses of Sergei Alexandrovich Yesenin.)	
Six Romances for Voice and Piano	16	Singing Winter	E♭ major	—	–		1927	(Note: Song → A composition part of Kosenko's cycle of romances. No. 1 set to the verses of Konstantin Dmitriyevich Balmont, No. 2 and No. 3 to the verses of Fyodor Ivanovich Tyutchev. Song No. 4, for soprano and piano, set to the verses of Nikolay Platonovich Ogarev, No. 5 to the verses of Aleksey Konstantinovich Tolstoy, and No. 6 to the verses of Sergei Alexandrovich Yesenin.)	
Six Romances for Voice and Piano	16	If Only You Could	—	—	–		1928	(Note: Song → A composition part of Kosenko's cycle of romances. No. 1 set to the verses of Konstantin Dmitriyevich Balmont, No. 2 and No. 3 to the verses of Fyodor Ivanovich Tyutchev. Song No. 4, for soprano and piano, set to the verses of Nikolay Platonovich Ogarev, No. 5 to the verses of Aleksey Konstantinovich Tolstoy, and No. 6 to the verses of Sergei Alexandrovich Yesenin.)	
Three Romances for Voice and Piano	16 bis	Na Maidani	—	—	–		1927	(Note: Song → A composition for voice and piano set to verses of Pavlo Tychyna. Romance No. 1 is also known by Na Maidani (Na Maidani Kolo Tserkvy = On the Square by the Church). The transliteration of song No. 1 is Mobilizuiutsia Topoli.)	
Three Romances for Voice and Piano	16 bis	The Poplars Mobilize	—	—	–		1927	(Note: Song → A composition for voice and piano set to verses of Pavlo Tychyna. Romance No. 1 is also known by Na Maidani (Na Maidani Kolo Tserkvy = On the Square by the Church). The transliteration of song No. 1 is Mobilizuiutsia Topoli.)	
Three Romances for Voice and Piano	16 bis	Coming From Work at the Factory	—	—	–		1927	(Note: Song → A composition for voice and piano set to verses of Pavlo Tychyna. Romance No. 1 is also known by Na Maidani (Na Maidani Kolo Tserkvy = On the Square by the Church). The transliteration of song No. 1 is Mobilizuiutsia Topoli.)	
Classical Trio for Violin, Cello and Piano	17	—	D major	Allegro con brio			1927	(Note: Piano trio → Trio for violin, cello and piano.)	
Classical Trio for Violin, Cello and Piano	17	—	—	Scherzo	–		1927	(Note: Piano trio → Trio for violin, cello and piano.)	
Classical Trio for Violin, Cello and Piano	17	—	—	Largo	–		1927	(Note: Piano trio → Trio for violin, cello and piano.)	
Classical Trio for Violin, Cello and Piano	17	—	—	Allegro	–		1927	(Note: Piano trio → Trio for violin, cello and piano.)	
Sonata for Violin and Piano	18	—	A minor	Allegro			1927	(Note: Sonata → Duo for violin and piano.)	
Sonata for Violin and Piano	18	—	A minor	Andantino semplice			1927	(Note: Sonata → Duo for violin and piano.)	
Eleven Études in the Form of Old Dances	19	Gavotte	D♭ major	Allegro mosso			1928–30	(Note: Étude → Kosenko described this work as a "family album", having he dedicated selected pieces to members of his family, such as Rigaudon to his nephew Fedir, and Passacaglia to his wife Anna.)	
Eleven Études in the Form of Old Dances	19	Allemande	B♭ minor	Moderato			1928–30	(Note: Étude → Kosenko described this work as a "family album", having he dedicated selected pieces to members of his family, such as Rigaudon to his nephew Fedir, and Passacaglia to his wife Anna.)	
Eleven Études in the Form of Old Dances	19	Menuet	G major	Allegretto			1928–30	(Note: Étude → Kosenko described this work as a "family album", having he dedicated selected pieces to members of his family, such as Rigaudon to his nephew Fedir, and Passacaglia to his wife Anna.)	
Eleven Études in the Form of Old Dances	19	Courante	E minor	Vivace			1928–30	(Note: Étude → Kosenko described this work as a "family album", having he dedicated selected pieces to members of his family, such as Rigaudon to his nephew Fedir, and Passacaglia to his wife Anna.)	
Eleven Études in the Form of Old Dances	19	Sarabande	A minor	Adagio			1928–30	(Note: Étude → Kosenko described this work as a "family album", having he dedicated selected pieces to members of his family, such as Rigaudon to his nephew Fedir, and Passacaglia to his wife Anna.)	
Eleven Études in the Form of Old Dances	19	Bourrée	A major	Allegro			1928–30	(Note: Étude → Kosenko described this work as a "family album", having he dedicated selected pieces to members of his family, such as Rigaudon to his nephew Fedir, and Passacaglia to his wife Anna.)	
Eleven Études in the Form of Old Dances	19	Gavotte	B minor	Allegro moderato			1928–30	(Note: Étude → Kosenko described this work as a "family album", having he dedicated selected pieces to members of his family, such as Rigaudon to his nephew Fedir, and Passacaglia to his wife Anna.)	
Eleven Études in the Form of Old Dances	19	Rigaudon	C major	Vivace			1928–30	(Note: Étude → Kosenko described this work as a "family album", having he dedicated selected pieces to members of his family, such as Rigaudon to his nephew Fedir, and Passacaglia to his wife Anna.)	
Eleven Études in the Form of Old Dances	19	Menuet	E♭ major	Allegretto			1928–30	(Note: Étude → Kosenko described this work as a "family album", having he dedicated selected pieces to members of his family, such as Rigaudon to his nephew Fedir, and Passacaglia to his wife Anna.)	
Eleven Études in the Form of Old Dances	19	Passacaglia	G minor	Andante con grandezza			1928–30	(Note: Étude → Kosenko described this work as a "family album", having he dedicated selected pieces to members of his family, such as Rigaudon to his nephew Fedir, and Passacaglia to his wife Anna.)	
Eleven Études in the Form of Old Dances	19	Gigue	D minor	Presto			1928–30	(Note: Étude → Kosenko described this work as a "family album", having he dedicated selected pieces to members of his family, such as Rigaudon to his nephew Fedir, and Passacaglia to his wife Anna.)	
Five Romances for Voice and Piano	20	I Loved You	—	—	–		1930	(Note: Song → A composition part of Kosenko's cycle of romances set to the verses of Alexander Pushkin. Romance No. 1 was written for soprano and piano, and No. 2 for bass and piano. No. 4 for medium voice and piano accompaniment with transcription by Maksym Rylsky. Romance No. 3, for double bass, baritone and piano, was written over a Scottish folk song with verses by Alexander Pushkin.)	
Five Romances for Voice and Piano	20	I Survived My Desire	—	—	–		1930	(Note: Song → A composition part of Kosenko's cycle of romances set to the verses of Alexander Pushkin. Romance No. 1 was written for soprano and piano, and No. 2 for bass and piano. No. 4 for medium voice and piano accompaniment with transcription by Maksym Rylsky. Romance No. 3, for double bass, baritone and piano, was written over a Scottish folk song with verses by Alexander Pushkin.)	
Five Romances for Voice and Piano	20	Crow to Crow Fly	F♯ minor	Allegro alla marcia			1930	(Note: Song → A composition part of Kosenko's cycle of romances set to the verses of Alexander Pushkin. Romance No. 1 was written for soprano and piano, and No. 2 for bass and piano. No. 4 for medium voice and piano accompaniment with transcription by Maksym Rylsky. Romance No. 3, for double bass, baritone and piano, was written over a Scottish folk song with verses by Alexander Pushkin.)	
Five Romances for Voice and Piano	20	Evening Song	B♭ major	Moderato			1930	(Note: Song → A composition part of Kosenko's cycle of romances set to the verses of Alexander Pushkin. Romance No. 1 was written for soprano and piano, and No. 2 for bass and piano. No. 4 for medium voice and piano accompaniment with transcription by Maksym Rylsky. Romance No. 3, for double bass, baritone and piano, was written over a Scottish folk song with verses by Alexander Pushkin.)	
Five Romances for Voice and Piano	20	The Old Song	A♭ major	Largo			1930	(Note: Song → A composition part of Kosenko's cycle of romances set to the verses of Alexander Pushkin. Romance No. 1 was written for soprano and piano, and No. 2 for bass and piano. No. 4 for medium voice and piano accompaniment with transcription by Maksym Rylsky. Romance No. 3, for double bass, baritone and piano, was written over a Scottish folk song with verses by Alexander Pushkin.)	
Heroic Overture	21	—	—	—	–		1932	(Note: Overture → For orchestra)	
Two Concert Waltzes	22	—	F♯ minor	Allegro giusto			1931	(Note: Waltz Two Concert Waltzes is also one of Kosenko's best known works.)	
Two Concert Waltzes	22	—	A minor	Presto agitato			1931	(Note: Waltz Two Concert Waltzes is also one of Kosenko's best known works.)	
Concerto for Piano and Orchestra	23	—	C minor	Allegro			1928–37	(Note: Concerto → This piano concerto was written in three parts by the composer, but during World War II some of his notes were lost, remaining intact only the first part. The second and third parts were saved only in small details to be later finished by composers Revutsky and Maiboroda in 1937, although some sources also mention the name of A. A. Kolomiyts. Arranged for two pianos.)	
Three Romances for Voice and Piano	24	The Nightingale and the Rose	—	—	–		1936	(Note: Song → Compositions for bass and piano set to the verses of Alexander Pushkin.)	
Three Romances for Voice and Piano	24	A Message to Siberia	—	—	–		1936	(Note: Song → Compositions for bass and piano set to the verses of Alexander Pushkin.)	
Three Romances for Voice and Piano	24	I Am Here, Inezilya	B♭ major	Allegro giusto			1936	(Note: Song → Compositions for bass and piano set to the verses of Alexander Pushkin.)	
Twenty-four Pieces for Children	25	Petroushka	C major	Allegro mosso			1936	(Note: Étude Twenty-four Pieces for Children (also 24 Pieces for Children), Op. 25, is one of Kosenko's three A-number one creations along with Op. 8 and Op. 19. It is still an obligatory set of compositions written specifically for children learning the piano in conservatoires and piano schools across the country.)	
Twenty-four Pieces for Children	25	After a Butterfly	A minor	Presto			1936	(Note: Étude Twenty-four Pieces for Children (also 24 Pieces for Children), Op. 25, is one of Kosenko's three A-number one creations along with Op. 8 and Op. 19. It is still an obligatory set of compositions written specifically for children learning the piano in conservatoires and piano schools across the country.)	
Twenty-four Pieces for Children	25	Pioneer's Song	G major	Allegro alla marcia			1936	(Note: Étude Twenty-four Pieces for Children (also 24 Pieces for Children), Op. 25, is one of Kosenko's three A-number one creations along with Op. 8 and Op. 19. It is still an obligatory set of compositions written specifically for children learning the piano in conservatoires and piano schools across the country.)	
Twenty-four Pieces for Children	25	Ukrainian Folk Song	E minor	Moderato			1936	(Note: Étude Twenty-four Pieces for Children (also 24 Pieces for Children), Op. 25, is one of Kosenko's three A-number one creations along with Op. 8 and Op. 19. It is still an obligatory set of compositions written specifically for children learning the piano in conservatoires and piano schools across the country.)	
Twenty-four Pieces for Children	25	On the Edge of the Forest	D major	Allegro moderato			1936	(Note: Étude Twenty-four Pieces for Children (also 24 Pieces for Children), Op. 25, is one of Kosenko's three A-number one creations along with Op. 8 and Op. 19. It is still an obligatory set of compositions written specifically for children learning the piano in conservatoires and piano schools across the country.)	
Twenty-four Pieces for Children	25	Waltz	B minor	Tempo di Valse lento			1936	(Note: Étude Twenty-four Pieces for Children (also 24 Pieces for Children), Op. 25, is one of Kosenko's three A-number one creations along with Op. 8 and Op. 19. It is still an obligatory set of compositions written specifically for children learning the piano in conservatoires and piano schools across the country.)	
Twenty-four Pieces for Children	25	Morning in the Orchard	A major	Allegro vivace			1936	(Note: Étude Twenty-four Pieces for Children (also 24 Pieces for Children), Op. 25, is one of Kosenko's three A-number one creations along with Op. 8 and Op. 19. It is still an obligatory set of compositions written specifically for children learning the piano in conservatoires and piano schools across the country.)	
Twenty-four Pieces for Children	25	They Don't Want to Buy a Teddy Bear	F♯ minor	Moderato			1936	(Note: Étude Twenty-four Pieces for Children (also 24 Pieces for Children), Op. 25, is one of Kosenko's three A-number one creations along with Op. 8 and Op. 19. It is still an obligatory set of compositions written specifically for children learning the piano in conservatoires and piano schools across the country.)	
Twenty-four Pieces for Children	25	They Have Bought a Teddy Bear	E major	Prestissimo			1936	(Note: Étude Twenty-four Pieces for Children (also 24 Pieces for Children), Op. 25, is one of Kosenko's three A-number one creations along with Op. 8 and Op. 19. It is still an obligatory set of compositions written specifically for children learning the piano in conservatoires and piano schools across the country.)	
Twenty-four Pieces for Children	25	Polka	C♯ minor	Allegro gusto			1936	(Note: Étude Twenty-four Pieces for Children (also 24 Pieces for Children), Op. 25, is one of Kosenko's three A-number one creations along with Op. 8 and Op. 19. It is still an obligatory set of compositions written specifically for children learning the piano in conservatoires and piano schools across the country.)	
Twenty-four Pieces for Children	25	Pastorale	B major	Andante			1936	(Note: Étude Twenty-four Pieces for Children (also 24 Pieces for Children), Op. 25, is one of Kosenko's three A-number one creations along with Op. 8 and Op. 19. It is still an obligatory set of compositions written specifically for children learning the piano in conservatoires and piano schools across the country.)	
Twenty-four Pieces for Children	25	Melody	G♯ minor	Andantino cantabile			1936	(Note: Étude Twenty-four Pieces for Children (also 24 Pieces for Children), Op. 25, is one of Kosenko's three A-number one creations along with Op. 8 and Op. 19. It is still an obligatory set of compositions written specifically for children learning the piano in conservatoires and piano schools across the country.)	
Twenty-four Pieces for Children	25	In March!	G♭ major	Allegro marciale			1936	(Note: Étude Twenty-four Pieces for Children (also 24 Pieces for Children), Op. 25, is one of Kosenko's three A-number one creations along with Op. 8 and Op. 19. It is still an obligatory set of compositions written specifically for children learning the piano in conservatoires and piano schools across the country.)	
Twenty-four Pieces for Children	25	Little Rain	E♭ minor	Allegro scherzando			1936	(Note: Étude Twenty-four Pieces for Children (also 24 Pieces for Children), Op. 25, is one of Kosenko's three A-number one creations along with Op. 8 and Op. 19. It is still an obligatory set of compositions written specifically for children learning the piano in conservatoires and piano schools across the country.)	
Twenty-four Pieces for Children	25	Lullaby	D♭ major	Moderato			1936	(Note: Étude Twenty-four Pieces for Children (also 24 Pieces for Children), Op. 25, is one of Kosenko's three A-number one creations along with Op. 8 and Op. 19. It is still an obligatory set of compositions written specifically for children learning the piano in conservatoires and piano schools across the country.)	
Twenty-four Pieces for Children	25	Étude	B♭ minor	Allegro molto			1936	(Note: Étude Twenty-four Pieces for Children (also 24 Pieces for Children), Op. 25, is one of Kosenko's three A-number one creations along with Op. 8 and Op. 19. It is still an obligatory set of compositions written specifically for children learning the piano in conservatoires and piano schools across the country.)	
Twenty-four Pieces for Children	25	Little Jumping-rope	A♭ major	Allegro vivo			1936	(Note: Étude Twenty-four Pieces for Children (also 24 Pieces for Children), Op. 25, is one of Kosenko's three A-number one creations along with Op. 8 and Op. 19. It is still an obligatory set of compositions written specifically for children learning the piano in conservatoires and piano schools across the country.)	
Twenty-four Pieces for Children	25	Ballet Scene	F minor	Allegretto scherzando			1936	(Note: Étude Twenty-four Pieces for Children (also 24 Pieces for Children), Op. 25, is one of Kosenko's three A-number one creations along with Op. 8 and Op. 19. It is still an obligatory set of compositions written specifically for children learning the piano in conservatoires and piano schools across the country.)	
Twenty-four Pieces for Children	25	Humoresque	E♭ major	Allegro non troppo			1936	(Note: Étude Twenty-four Pieces for Children (also 24 Pieces for Children), Op. 25, is one of Kosenko's three A-number one creations along with Op. 8 and Op. 19. It is still an obligatory set of compositions written specifically for children learning the piano in conservatoires and piano schools across the country.)	
Twenty-four Pieces for Children	25	Mazurka	C minor	Allegretto semplice			1936	(Note: Étude Twenty-four Pieces for Children (also 24 Pieces for Children), Op. 25, is one of Kosenko's three A-number one creations along with Op. 8 and Op. 19. It is still an obligatory set of compositions written specifically for children learning the piano in conservatoires and piano schools across the country.)	
Twenty-four Pieces for Children	25	Pljasovaja Dance	B♭ major	Allegro mosso			1936	(Note: Étude Twenty-four Pieces for Children (also 24 Pieces for Children), Op. 25, is one of Kosenko's three A-number one creations along with Op. 8 and Op. 19. It is still an obligatory set of compositions written specifically for children learning the piano in conservatoires and piano schools across the country.)	
Twenty-four Pieces for Children	25	Fairytale	G minor	Allegro commodo			1936	(Note: Étude Twenty-four Pieces for Children (also 24 Pieces for Children), Op. 25, is one of Kosenko's three A-number one creations along with Op. 8 and Op. 19. It is still an obligatory set of compositions written specifically for children learning the piano in conservatoires and piano schools across the country.)	
Twenty-four Pieces for Children	25	Young Budyonnovs' March	F major	Allegro marciale			1936	(Note: Étude Twenty-four Pieces for Children (also 24 Pieces for Children), Op. 25, is one of Kosenko's three A-number one creations along with Op. 8 and Op. 19. It is still an obligatory set of compositions written specifically for children learning the piano in conservatoires and piano schools across the country.)	
Twenty-four Pieces for Children	25	Toccatina	D minor	Allegro di molto			1936	(Note: Étude Twenty-four Pieces for Children (also 24 Pieces for Children), Op. 25, is one of Kosenko's three A-number one creations along with Op. 8 and Op. 19. It is still an obligatory set of compositions written specifically for children learning the piano in conservatoires and piano schools across the country.)	
Moldavian Poem	26	—	—	—	–		1934–37	(Note: Symphony → This symphonic composition, which Kosenko never heard performed, was written during the time that he was professor of the Kiev Conservatory. It became part of the classic heritage of Ukrainian music.)	

=== Works without opus number ===
Title	Opus	Name	Key	Tempo	Im	Ge	Year	No	Re
Three Pieces for Piano	—	Barcarolle	B major	—	–		1905	(Note: Morceau → After Kosenko's death many of his works remained in manuscript. Muzyczna Ukraina lists this manuscript as lost.)	
Three Pieces for Piano	—	Waltz	G♭ major	—	–		1905	(Note: Morceau → After Kosenko's death many of his works remained in manuscript. Muzyczna Ukraina lists this manuscript as lost.)	
Three Pieces for Piano	—	Prelude	G♯ minor	—	–		1909	(Note: Morceau → After Kosenko's death many of his works remained in manuscript. Muzyczna Ukraina lists this manuscript as lost.)	
Berceuse	—	—	B major	—	–		1915	(Note: In manuscript only.)	
Three Pieces for Voice and Piano	—	Gentle Fluttering Twighlight	—	—	–		1916	(Note: Song → A composition for voice and piano. Song No. 3 set to the verses of V. Molchanov.)	
Three Pieces for Voice and Piano	—	The Years Have Rushed By	—	—	–		1916	(Note: Song → A composition for voice and piano. Song No. 3 set to the verses of V. Molchanov.)	
Three Pieces for Voice and Piano	—	Quiet Night, Barely Audible Stomping	—	—	–		1916	(Note: Song → A composition for voice and piano. Song No. 3 set to the verses of V. Molchanov.)	
Valse Oubliée	—	—	C♯ minor	Cadenza a piacere	–		1917	(Note: Fantasia → Composition for piano on themes by Franz Liszt dedicated to Mme. Angelique de Kanaipp. Arranged for chamber orchestra for theatrical performances, and also for string quartet. In manuscript only.)	
Five Pieces for Bassoon, Clarinet, Flute and Oboe	—	Introduction	—	—	–		—	(Note: Quartet → Woodwind quartet, in instrumentation for flute, oboe, clarinet and bassoon.)	
Five Pieces for Bassoon, Clarinet, Flute and Oboe	—	Melody	—	—	–		—	(Note: Quartet → Woodwind quartet, in instrumentation for flute, oboe, clarinet and bassoon.)	
Five Pieces for Bassoon, Clarinet, Flute and Oboe	—	Pastoral	—	—	–		—	(Note: Quartet → Woodwind quartet, in instrumentation for flute, oboe, clarinet and bassoon.)	
Five Pieces for Bassoon, Clarinet, Flute and Oboe	—	Humoresque	—	—	–		—	(Note: Quartet → Woodwind quartet, in instrumentation for flute, oboe, clarinet and bassoon.)	
Five Pieces for Bassoon, Clarinet, Flute and Oboe	—	Raindrops	—	—	–		—	(Note: Quartet → Woodwind quartet, in instrumentation for flute, oboe, clarinet and bassoon.)	
Pieces for Violin and Piano	—	—	—	—	–		1919	(Note: Morceau → Duo.)	
Mother's Death	—	—	—	—	–		1919	(Note: Song → Composition based on a poem by Pierre-Jean de Beranger. Kosenko was inspired by his own personal sorrow.)	
Fairy of the Bitter Almond	—	—	—	—	–		1926–27	(Note: Symphony → Kosenko composed the introduction and prologue to Ukrainian playwright Ivan Kocherha's comedy Fairy of the Bitter Almond.)	
Desire Under the Elms	—	Introduction	—	—	–		1927–28	(Note: Symphony → Kosenko wrote music to American dramatist Eugene O'Neill's play Desire Under the Elms. Two pieces were published. Manuscript for song No. 2 is lost and the other two remain unpublished.)	
Desire Under the Elms	—	Song of Peter and Simeon	—	—	–		1927–28	(Note: Symphony → Kosenko wrote music to American dramatist Eugene O'Neill's play Desire Under the Elms. Two pieces were published. Manuscript for song No. 2 is lost and the other two remain unpublished.)	
Desire Under the Elms	—	Dance – Quasi gavotte	—	—	–		1927–28	(Note: Symphony → Kosenko wrote music to American dramatist Eugene O'Neill's play Desire Under the Elms. Two pieces were published. Manuscript for song No. 2 is lost and the other two remain unpublished.)	
Desire Under the Elms	—	Indian Dance	—	—	–		1927–28	(Note: Symphony → Kosenko wrote music to American dramatist Eugene O'Neill's play Desire Under the Elms. Two pieces were published. Manuscript for song No. 2 is lost and the other two remain unpublished.)	
Desire Under the Elms	—	Dramatic Étude	—	—	–		1927–28	(Note: Symphony → Kosenko wrote music to American dramatist Eugene O'Neill's play Desire Under the Elms. Two pieces were published. Manuscript for song No. 2 is lost and the other two remain unpublished.)	
Sonata for Viola and Piano	—	—	—	—	–		1927–28	(Note: Sonata → Muzyczna Ukraina and all the other sources list this manuscript as lost.)	
String Quartet	—	—	—	—	–		1927–30	(Note: Quartet → Quartet for two violins, viola and cello.)	
Oh, What Crow Is That	—	—	—	—	–		1928–29	(Note: Song → Composition for choir and piano arranged from a Ukrainian folk song.)	
Hey, Let us Strike	—	—	—	—	–		1928–29	(Note: Song → Composition for voice and piano.)	
Thirteen Ukrainian Folksongs	—	Oh, I Left for the Sheaves	—	—	–		1928	(Note: Song → Arrangement of Ukrainian folk songs for voice and piano. Song No. 7 written for mezzo-soprano and piano accompaniment. Song No. 11 has for title the Slavic word "Hryts", which is a diminutive form of the name "Grigoriy". Song. No. 13 was harmonized by G. Vieriovky, over the verses of T. Butovyts.)	
Thirteen Ukrainian Folksongs	—	Merited Bread Is Good	—	—	–		1935	(Note: Song → Arrangement of Ukrainian folk songs for voice and piano. Song No. 7 written for mezzo-soprano and piano accompaniment. Song No. 11 has for title the Slavic word "Hryts", which is a diminutive form of the name "Grigoriy". Song. No. 13 was harmonized by G. Vieriovky, over the verses of T. Butovyts.)	
Thirteen Ukrainian Folksongs	—	Oh, My Fate Heard This	—	—	–		1935	(Note: Song → Arrangement of Ukrainian folk songs for voice and piano. Song No. 7 written for mezzo-soprano and piano accompaniment. Song No. 11 has for title the Slavic word "Hryts", which is a diminutive form of the name "Grigoriy". Song. No. 13 was harmonized by G. Vieriovky, over the verses of T. Butovyts.)	
Thirteen Ukrainian Folksongs	—	The Cuckoo Cuckooed	—	—	–		1935–36	(Note: Song → Arrangement of Ukrainian folk songs for voice and piano. Song No. 7 written for mezzo-soprano and piano accompaniment. Song No. 11 has for title the Slavic word "Hryts", which is a diminutive form of the name "Grigoriy". Song. No. 13 was harmonized by G. Vieriovky, over the verses of T. Butovyts.)	
Thirteen Ukrainian Folksongs	—	Oh Meadow, Don't Hum	—	—	–		1935–36	(Note: Song → Arrangement of Ukrainian folk songs for voice and piano. Song No. 7 written for mezzo-soprano and piano accompaniment. Song No. 11 has for title the Slavic word "Hryts", which is a diminutive form of the name "Grigoriy". Song. No. 13 was harmonized by G. Vieriovky, over the verses of T. Butovyts.)	
Thirteen Ukrainian Folksongs	—	Oh ai, Mother	—	—	–		1935–36	(Note: Song → Arrangement of Ukrainian folk songs for voice and piano. Song No. 7 written for mezzo-soprano and piano accompaniment. Song No. 11 has for title the Slavic word "Hryts", which is a diminutive form of the name "Grigoriy". Song. No. 13 was harmonized by G. Vieriovky, over the verses of T. Butovyts.)	
Thirteen Ukrainian Folksongs	—	What Shall We Do	—	—	–		1935–36	(Note: Song → Arrangement of Ukrainian folk songs for voice and piano. Song No. 7 written for mezzo-soprano and piano accompaniment. Song No. 11 has for title the Slavic word "Hryts", which is a diminutive form of the name "Grigoriy". Song. No. 13 was harmonized by G. Vieriovky, over the verses of T. Butovyts.)	
Thirteen Ukrainian Folksongs	—	A Rich Man Had	—	—	–		1935–36	(Note: Song → Arrangement of Ukrainian folk songs for voice and piano. Song No. 7 written for mezzo-soprano and piano accompaniment. Song No. 11 has for title the Slavic word "Hryts", which is a diminutive form of the name "Grigoriy". Song. No. 13 was harmonized by G. Vieriovky, over the verses of T. Butovyts.)	
Thirteen Ukrainian Folksongs	—	I Would Take a Bandura	—	—	–		1936	(Note: Song → Arrangement of Ukrainian folk songs for voice and piano. Song No. 7 written for mezzo-soprano and piano accompaniment. Song No. 11 has for title the Slavic word "Hryts", which is a diminutive form of the name "Grigoriy". Song. No. 13 was harmonized by G. Vieriovky, over the verses of T. Butovyts.)	
Thirteen Ukrainian Folksongs	—	I Loved a Widow	—	—	–		1936	(Note: Song → Arrangement of Ukrainian folk songs for voice and piano. Song No. 7 written for mezzo-soprano and piano accompaniment. Song No. 11 has for title the Slavic word "Hryts", which is a diminutive form of the name "Grigoriy". Song. No. 13 was harmonized by G. Vieriovky, over the verses of T. Butovyts.)	
Thirteen Ukrainian Folksongs	—	My Son Went Somewhere	—	—	–		1936	(Note: Song → Arrangement of Ukrainian folk songs for voice and piano. Song No. 7 written for mezzo-soprano and piano accompaniment. Song No. 11 has for title the Slavic word "Hryts", which is a diminutive form of the name "Grigoriy". Song. No. 13 was harmonized by G. Vieriovky, over the verses of T. Butovyts.)	
Thirteen Ukrainian Folksongs	—	Oh Hryts, Hryts, to work	—	—	–		1937	(Note: Song → Arrangement of Ukrainian folk songs for voice and piano. Song No. 7 written for mezzo-soprano and piano accompaniment. Song No. 11 has for title the Slavic word "Hryts", which is a diminutive form of the name "Grigoriy". Song. No. 13 was harmonized by G. Vieriovky, over the verses of T. Butovyts.)	
Thirteen Ukrainian Folksongs	—	Troublemaker	—	—	–		1937	(Note: Song → Arrangement of Ukrainian folk songs for voice and piano. Song No. 7 written for mezzo-soprano and piano accompaniment. Song No. 11 has for title the Slavic word "Hryts", which is a diminutive form of the name "Grigoriy". Song. No. 13 was harmonized by G. Vieriovky, over the verses of T. Butovyts.)	
Four Pieces for Children	—	Melody	A minor	Moderato			1929–30	(Note: Étude → Composition loosely based on Robert Schumann's Kinderszenen.)	
Four Pieces for Children	—	Old Fashioned Dance	F major	Tempo di minuetto			1929–30	(Note: Étude → Composition loosely based on Robert Schumann's Kinderszenen.)	
Four Pieces for Children	—	Scherzino	D minor	Presto			1929–30	(Note: Étude → Composition loosely based on Robert Schumann's Kinderszenen.)	
Four Pieces for Children	—	March	D major	Allegro			1929–30	(Note: Étude → Composition loosely based on Robert Schumann's Kinderszenen.)	
Song for Voice and Piano	—	—	—	—	–		1930	(Note: Song → Composition for voice and piano with lyrics by Grebliov. In manuscript only.)	
Tempos	—	—	—	—	–		1930–31	(Note: Song → Satirical composition for voice and piano. In manuscript only.)	
May Day	—	—	—	—	–		1930–32	(Note: Song → Composition for voice and piano (Lyrics by D. Grudyna).)	
A Dashing Motorway March	—	—	—	—	–		1930–34	(Note: Song → Composition for voice and piano (Lyrics by I. Rauze).)	
The Revolution	—	—	—	—	–		1931	(Note: Ballad → Composition for voice and piano (Lyrics by K. Libkneht).)	
In Memory of the Paris Commune Fighters	—	—	—	—	–		1931	(Note: Song → Composition for soprano and piano set to the verses of Pyotr Mikhailovich Nevezhin.)	
Ring Out, ye March the Industries	—	—	—	—	–		1931	(Note: Song → Composition for voice and piano (Lyrics by A. Zhurba).)	
Two Pieces for Voice and Piano	—	Komsomol Song	—	—	–		1931	(Note: Song → Compositions set to the verses of Ukrainian poet Olena Zhurlyva and A. Zurba, respectively.)	
Two Pieces for Voice and Piano	—	Industrial March	—	—	–		1931	(Note: Song → Compositions set to the verses of Ukrainian poet Olena Zhurlyva and A. Zurba, respectively.)	
The Warfare Path of the 44th Kiev Rifle Division Holding the Order of the Red Banner	—	Behind Siberia the Sun Rises	—	—	–		1931	(Note: Song → Ten literary-musical compositions for choir and piano. Song No. 2 has for title the word Bohuntsi, which refers to the personnel of the First Regiment of the Ukrainian Soviet Army formed on the orders of the Central Military Revolutionary Committee of Ukraine on 22 September 1918. In May 1919, the Bohuntsi were reorganized into the First Regiment, and after a while renamed the 44th Kievskaya of The Red Banner Rifle Division. Song No. 6 has for title the word Taraschantsi. Their regiment was formed in September 1918 around Unecha-Pochep, north of Starodub, and called the "Bogunskaya Rebel Regiment". They were the most active of all Soviet forces at the time, and had for their leader Commander Nikolay Aleksandrovich Shchors.)	
The Warfare Path of the 44th Kiev Rifle Division Holding the Order of the Red Banner	—	We Bohuntsi	—	—	–		1931		
The Warfare Path of the 44th Kiev Rifle Division Holding the Order of the Red Banner	—	Under Unecha's Shchors We Rise	—	—	–		1931		
The Warfare Path of the 44th Kiev Rifle Division Holding the Order of the Red Banner	—	Our Regiment Has Been Created	—	—	–		1931		
The Warfare Path of the 44th Kiev Rifle Division Holding the Order of the Red Banner	—	Into a Large Cloud	—	—	–		1931		
The Warfare Path of the 44th Kiev Rifle Division Holding the Order of the Red Banner	—	Hey, Tarashchantsi	—	—	–		1931		
The Warfare Path of the 44th Kiev Rifle Division Holding the Order of the Red Banner	—	May the Ice Beneath us Be Friendly	—	—	–		1931		
The Warfare Path of the 44th Kiev Rifle Division Holding the Order of the Red Banner	—	A Loud Song Flows in the Field	—	—	–		1931		
The Warfare Path of the 44th Kiev Rifle Division Holding the Order of the Red Banner	—	We Are Brave Fighters	—	—	–		1931		
The Warfare Path of the 44th Kiev Rifle Division Holding the Order of the Red Banner	—	Fighters of the 44th	—	—	–		1931		
The Reapers are Harvesting on the Hillside	—	—	—	—	–		1931–33	(Note: Choir → Composition for choir a cappella over an arrangement of a Ukrainian folk song.)	
Eight Pieces for Male Vocal Quartet	—	Song of the Border Guards	—	—	–		1931–33	(Note: Song → Compositions for male voices set to the verses of B. Symancev. Song. Song No. 2 has for title the term "Prohulnycka" (truants), which translated refers to a group of people who are absent without permission, or who shirk work or duty. Song No. 3 is a Ukrainian folk song, while No. 4 and No. 5 (manuscript) are Belorussian folk songs. Song No. 6 is a satirical anti-religious work. Song No. 7 is a Tartan folk song, and No. 8 is a composition for choir and piano.)	
Eight Pieces for Male Vocal Quartet	—	Prohulnycka Brigade	—	—	–		1931–33	(Note: Song → Compositions for male voices set to the verses of B. Symancev. Song. Song No. 2 has for title the term "Prohulnycka" (truants), which translated refers to a group of people who are absent without permission, or who shirk work or duty. Song No. 3 is a Ukrainian folk song, while No. 4 and No. 5 (manuscript) are Belorussian folk songs. Song No. 6 is a satirical anti-religious work. Song No. 7 is a Tartan folk song, and No. 8 is a composition for choir and piano.)	
Eight Pieces for Male Vocal Quartet	—	Oh ai, Mother	—	—	–		1931–33	(Note: Song → Compositions for male voices set to the verses of B. Symancev. Song. Song No. 2 has for title the term "Prohulnycka" (truants), which translated refers to a group of people who are absent without permission, or who shirk work or duty. Song No. 3 is a Ukrainian folk song, while No. 4 and No. 5 (manuscript) are Belorussian folk songs. Song No. 6 is a satirical anti-religious work. Song No. 7 is a Tartan folk song, and No. 8 is a composition for choir and piano.)	
Eight Pieces for Male Vocal Quartet	—	The Geese have flown in	—	—	–		1931–33	(Note: Song → Compositions for male voices set to the verses of B. Symancev. Song. Song No. 2 has for title the term "Prohulnycka" (truants), which translated refers to a group of people who are absent without permission, or who shirk work or duty. Song No. 3 is a Ukrainian folk song, while No. 4 and No. 5 (manuscript) are Belorussian folk songs. Song No. 6 is a satirical anti-religious work. Song No. 7 is a Tartan folk song, and No. 8 is a composition for choir and piano.)	
Eight Pieces for Male Vocal Quartet	—	Wait, Girl	—	—	–		1931–33	(Note: Song → Compositions for male voices set to the verses of B. Symancev. Song. Song No. 2 has for title the term "Prohulnycka" (truants), which translated refers to a group of people who are absent without permission, or who shirk work or duty. Song No. 3 is a Ukrainian folk song, while No. 4 and No. 5 (manuscript) are Belorussian folk songs. Song No. 6 is a satirical anti-religious work. Song No. 7 is a Tartan folk song, and No. 8 is a composition for choir and piano.)	
Eight Pieces for Male Vocal Quartet	—	Humorous Anti-Religious	—	—	–		1931–33	(Note: Song → Compositions for male voices set to the verses of B. Symancev. Song. Song No. 2 has for title the term "Prohulnycka" (truants), which translated refers to a group of people who are absent without permission, or who shirk work or duty. Song No. 3 is a Ukrainian folk song, while No. 4 and No. 5 (manuscript) are Belorussian folk songs. Song No. 6 is a satirical anti-religious work. Song No. 7 is a Tartan folk song, and No. 8 is a composition for choir and piano.)	
Eight Pieces for Male Vocal Quartet	—	Left an Orphan Without a Father	—	—	–		1931–33	(Note: Song → Compositions for male voices set to the verses of B. Symancev. Song. Song No. 2 has for title the term "Prohulnycka" (truants), which translated refers to a group of people who are absent without permission, or who shirk work or duty. Song No. 3 is a Ukrainian folk song, while No. 4 and No. 5 (manuscript) are Belorussian folk songs. Song No. 6 is a satirical anti-religious work. Song No. 7 is a Tartan folk song, and No. 8 is a composition for choir and piano.)	
Eight Pieces for Male Vocal Quartet	—	Oh ai, ai	—	—	–		1931–33	(Note: Song → Compositions for male voices set to the verses of B. Symancev. Song. Song No. 2 has for title the term "Prohulnycka" (truants), which translated refers to a group of people who are absent without permission, or who shirk work or duty. Song No. 3 is a Ukrainian folk song, while No. 4 and No. 5 (manuscript) are Belorussian folk songs. Song No. 6 is a satirical anti-religious work. Song No. 7 is a Tartan folk song, and No. 8 is a composition for choir and piano.)	
Melodies for Children	—	Bagatelle	D major	—	–		1931	(Note: Morceau → Arrangement and harmonization to Minuet and Gavotte in A minor, by O. Golubytsky (1931-33).)	
Melodies for Children	—	Minuet	A minor	—	–		1932	(Note: Morceau → Arrangement and harmonization to Minuet and Gavotte in A minor, by O. Golubytsky (1931-33).)	
Melodies for Children	—	Minuet	G major	—	–		1932	(Note: Morceau → Arrangement and harmonization to Minuet and Gavotte in A minor, by O. Golubytsky (1931-33).)	
Melodies for Children	—	Gavotte	A minor	—	–		1933	(Note: Morceau → Arrangement and harmonization to Minuet and Gavotte in A minor, by O. Golubytsky (1931-33).)	
Toiler’s Song	—	—	—	—	–		1931–34	(Note: Song → Composition for voice and piano. In manuscript only.)	
Song of the Digger	—	—	—	—	–		1931–34	(Note: Song → Composition for voice and piano set to the verses of C. Gartni. The word Digger used in the translation is Australian military slang, applied to soldiers who dug protective trenches in World War I. The term originated during the Gallipoli Campaign, where digging was a commonplace activity.)	
Three Bolshevik Songs	—	Song of the Shock Workers of the Bolshevik Factory	—	—	–		1932–34	(Note: Song → Composition for voice and piano in celebration of the "Bilshovyk" (Bolshevik) Factory in Kiev, set to the verses of Gaponenko. The term "Shock Workers" refers to the concept of super productive workers in the Soviet Union and other countries of the Soviet bloc. It is derived from the expression údarny trud, often translated as "strike labour" (údarnik). The term "Komsomol" is a syllabic abbreviation from the Russian Kommunisticheskii Soyuz Molodyozhi, the youth division of the Communist Party of the Soviet Union.)	
Three Bolshevik Songs	—	Great May Day-March Song	—	—	–		1932–34		
Three Bolshevik Songs	—	Komsomolska	—	—	–		1932–34		
Now We Are Mowing Hay	—	—	—	—	–		1932–35	(Note: Choir → Composition for choir and piano.)	
We Sing Glory to the People of Volyn	—	—	—	—	–		1934	(Note: Choir → Composition for choir and piano.)	
The Last Port	—	—	—	—	–		1934	(Note: Symphony → Music for Arnold Kordyum (1890–1969) 1934 film The Last Port, which was based after Alexander Korneychuk's 1933 play Death of the Squadron. Kosenko intended to turn this musical work into a soft symphony, but only managed to finish the second part entitled After the battle (1937 manuscript).)	
Six Ukrainian Folksongs	—	The Mighty Dnieper Roars and Bellows	—	—	–		1935	(Note: Choir → Arrangement of Ukrainian Folksongs for voice and piano. Song No. 1 was set to the verses of Taras Shevchenko. Song No. 3 is a Duma about Stalin for medium voice with piano accompaniment, and Song No. 5 was written for bass and piano.)	
Six Ukrainian Folksongs	—	Oh, I Will Go Above the Meadow	—	—	–		1936	(Note: Choir → Arrangement of Ukrainian Folksongs for voice and piano. Song No. 1 was set to the verses of Taras Shevchenko. Song No. 3 is a Duma about Stalin for medium voice with piano accompaniment, and Song No. 5 was written for bass and piano.)	
Six Ukrainian Folksongs	—	Hey, in Our Village	—	—	–		1936	(Note: Choir → Arrangement of Ukrainian Folksongs for voice and piano. Song No. 1 was set to the verses of Taras Shevchenko. Song No. 3 is a Duma about Stalin for medium voice with piano accompaniment, and Song No. 5 was written for bass and piano.)	
Six Ukrainian Folksongs	—	Oh, There is Always Fog in the Mountain	—	—	–		1936	(Note: Choir → Arrangement of Ukrainian Folksongs for voice and piano. Song No. 1 was set to the verses of Taras Shevchenko. Song No. 3 is a Duma about Stalin for medium voice with piano accompaniment, and Song No. 5 was written for bass and piano.)	
Six Ukrainian Folksongs	—	Song of the Tyrol Tragedy	—	—	–		1936	(Note: Choir → Arrangement of Ukrainian Folksongs for voice and piano. Song No. 1 was set to the verses of Taras Shevchenko. Song No. 3 is a Duma about Stalin for medium voice with piano accompaniment, and Song No. 5 was written for bass and piano.)	
Six Ukrainian Folksongs	—	Oh, My Darling Left Me	—	—	–		1936	(Note: Choir → Arrangement of Ukrainian Folksongs for voice and piano. Song No. 1 was set to the verses of Taras Shevchenko. Song No. 3 is a Duma about Stalin for medium voice with piano accompaniment, and Song No. 5 was written for bass and piano.)	
Song of the Kursants Brigades	—	—	—	—	–		1936	(Note: Song → Composition for choir and piano set to the verses of I. Arturov.)	
Song of the Submariners	—	—	—	—	–		1936	(Note: Choir → Composition for choir and piano.)	
Song of Tetyana Oaklet	—	—	—	—	–		1936	(Note: Choir → Composition for choir and piano on verses of a folk song (Там, де сонце в небі кружить...). First published in 1937.)	
A Collection of Children's Songs for Piano	—	The Tale	G minor	—	–		1936	(Note: Étude → Composition for piano. Song No. 1 in manuscript only. Arrangement and harmonization of the songs by O. Golubytsky.)	
A Collection of Children's Songs for Piano	—	Autumn Song	C minor	—	–		1936	(Note: Étude → Composition for piano. Song No. 1 in manuscript only. Arrangement and harmonization of the songs by O. Golubytsky.)	
A Collection of Children's Songs for Piano	—	Courante	A major	—	–		1936	(Note: Étude → Composition for piano. Song No. 1 in manuscript only. Arrangement and harmonization of the songs by O. Golubytsky.)	
A Collection of Children's Songs for Piano	—	Scherzino	A minor	—	–		1936	(Note: Étude → Composition for piano. Song No. 1 in manuscript only. Arrangement and harmonization of the songs by O. Golubytsky.)	
A Collection of Children's Songs for Piano	—	Lullabye	E minor	—	–		1936	(Note: Étude → Composition for piano. Song No. 1 in manuscript only. Arrangement and harmonization of the songs by O. Golubytsky.)	
A Collection of Children's Songs for Piano	—	Spring Morning	B major	—	–		1936	(Note: Étude → Composition for piano. Song No. 1 in manuscript only. Arrangement and harmonization of the songs by O. Golubytsky.)	
A Collection of Children's Songs for Piano	—	Eastern Dance	D minor	—	–		1936	(Note: Étude → Composition for piano. Song No. 1 in manuscript only. Arrangement and harmonization of the songs by O. Golubytsky.)	
A Collection of Children's Songs for Piano	—	Moldavian Shepherds Song	A major	—	–		1936	(Note: Étude → Composition for piano. Song No. 1 in manuscript only. Arrangement and harmonization of the songs by O. Golubytsky.)	
Song of Kuzmyn's Kolkhoz Piatysotennyci	—	—	—	—	–		1936	(Note: Song → Composition for voice and piano set to the verses of O. Gryniuk. The term "Piatysotennyci" (five hundredth) refers to a group of peasant women who worked in collective farms at Kuzmyn during the collectivization period installed by the Soviet Government from 1928.)	
Songs for Children	—	Song of Grandfather Frost	—	—	–		1936–37	(Note: Choir → Composition for voice or male voices and piano accompaniment. Song. No. 1 (manuscript lost) set to the verses of I. Nechody. Songs No. 2 and 3 set to the verses of L. Zymnogo. Song No. 4 set to the verses of M. Prygary, and song No. 5 set to the verses of Maksym Rylsky.)	
Songs for Children	—	I Am Myke the Whistler	—	—	–		1936–37	(Note: Choir → Composition for voice or male voices and piano accompaniment. Song. No. 1 (manuscript lost) set to the verses of I. Nechody. Songs No. 2 and 3 set to the verses of L. Zymnogo. Song No. 4 set to the verses of M. Prygary, and song No. 5 set to the verses of Maksym Rylsky.)	
Songs for Children	—	Christmas tree	—	—	–		1936–37	(Note: Choir → Composition for voice or male voices and piano accompaniment. Song. No. 1 (manuscript lost) set to the verses of I. Nechody. Songs No. 2 and 3 set to the verses of L. Zymnogo. Song No. 4 set to the verses of M. Prygary, and song No. 5 set to the verses of Maksym Rylsky.)	
Songs for Children	—	Christmas tree	—	—	–		1936–37	(Note: Choir → Composition for voice or male voices and piano accompaniment. Song. No. 1 (manuscript lost) set to the verses of I. Nechody. Songs No. 2 and 3 set to the verses of L. Zymnogo. Song No. 4 set to the verses of M. Prygary, and song No. 5 set to the verses of Maksym Rylsky.)	
Songs for Children	—	Song of the Christmas Tree	—	—	–		1936–37	(Note: Choir → Composition for voice or male voices and piano accompaniment. Song. No. 1 (manuscript lost) set to the verses of I. Nechody. Songs No. 2 and 3 set to the verses of L. Zymnogo. Song No. 4 set to the verses of M. Prygary, and song No. 5 set to the verses of Maksym Rylsky.)	
Young Tractor Drivers	—	—	—	—	–		—	(Note: Song → Composition for voice and piano (Lyrics by I. Skliar).)	
The Withered Flower	—	—	—	—	–		—	(Note: Song → Composition for bass and piano set to a poem of Alexander Pushkin.)	
Winter Comes, Hello	—	—	D♭ major	Moderato	–		—	(Note: Song → Composition set to a poem of Sergei Alexandrovich Yesenin.)	
Passacaglia for Bayan	—	—	—	—	–		—	(Note: Passacaglia → Accordion arrangement for a Ukrainian folkloric song.)	
After the Battle	—	—	—	—	–		1937	(Note: Symphony → Symphonic scene from an unfinished Programme symphony based on the play The Last Port.)	
Maryna	—	—	—	—	–		1938	(Note: Opera → Kosenko's unfinished opera Marina (after Taras Shevchenko) was completed and prepared for later publication by his friends Boris Lyatoshinsky and Levko Revutsky.)	
Duma for Stalin	—	—	—	—	–		1938	(Note: Choir → A composition for medium-soprano with words by A. Isakova.)	
Friendship	—	—	—	—	–		1938	(Note: Choir → Composition for choir and piano (also for choir without piano accompaniment or even for voice or two voices and piano) after Taras Shevchenko (Words by Georgy Voronoy). This was Viktor Kosenko's last composition.)	
