= Op. 25 =

In music, Op. 25 stands for Opus number 25. Compositions that are assigned this number include:

- Beethoven – Serenade for flute, violin and viola
- Berlioz – L'enfance du Christ
- Brahms – Piano Quartet No. 1
- Britten – String Quartet No. 1
- Chausson – Poème
- Chopin – Études Op. 25
- D'Indy – Symphony on a French Mountain Air
- Dohnányi – Variations on a Nursery Tune
- Dvořák – Vanda
- Elgar – The Black Knight
- Enescu – Violin Sonata No. 3
- Holst – Sāvitri
- Klebe – Die Räuber
- Kosenko – Twenty-four Pieces for Children
- Mendelssohn – Piano Concerto No. 1
- Prokofiev – Symphony No. 1
- Rachmaninoff – Francesca da Rimini
- Rubinstein – Piano Concerto No. 1
- Sarasate – Carmen Fantasy
- Schoenberg – Suite for Piano
- Schubert – Die schöne Müllerin
- Schumann – Myrthen, twenty-six songs (4 books)
- Strauss – Guntram
- Szymanowski – Hagith
