= Overture in A minor =

Concert overture by Jean Sibelius

- Concert overture by Jean Sibelius
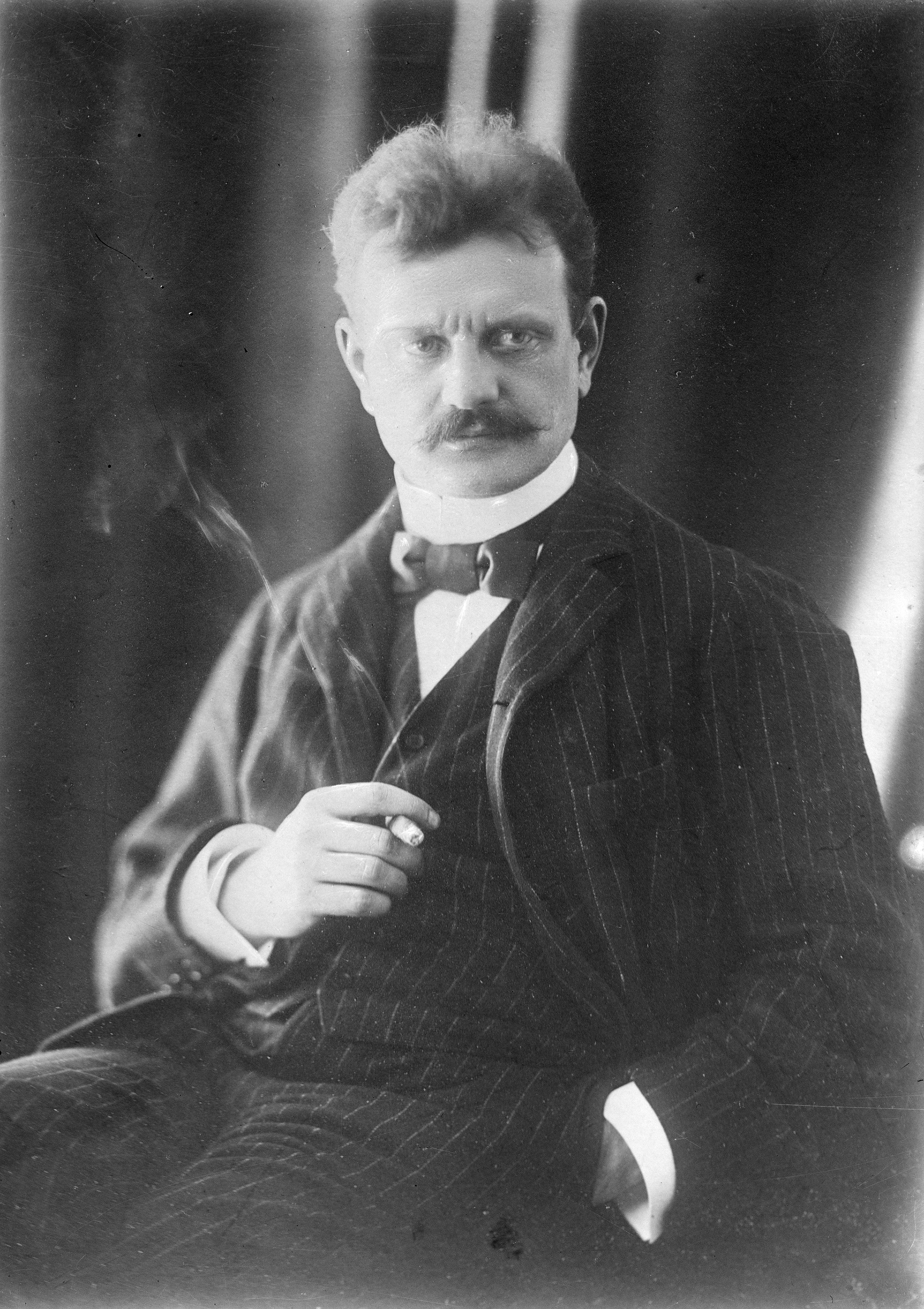
- The composer (c. 1902)
- Catalogue: JS 144
- Composed: 1902
- Publisher: Fazer Music (1997)
- Duration: 6.5 mins.

Premiere
- Date: 8 March 1902
- Location: Helsinki, Grand Duchy of Finland
- Conductor: Jean Sibelius
- Performers: Helsinki Philharmonic Society

The Overture in A minor, JS 144, is a single-movement work for orchestra written in 1902 by the Finnish composer Jean Sibelius. The piece premiered in Helsinki on 8 March 1902, the with Sibelius conducting the Helsinki Philharmonic Society. The overture led a program that evening also included two other first performances: the Second Symphony (Op. 43) and the Impromptu for female choir and orchestra (Op. 19; revised in 1910).

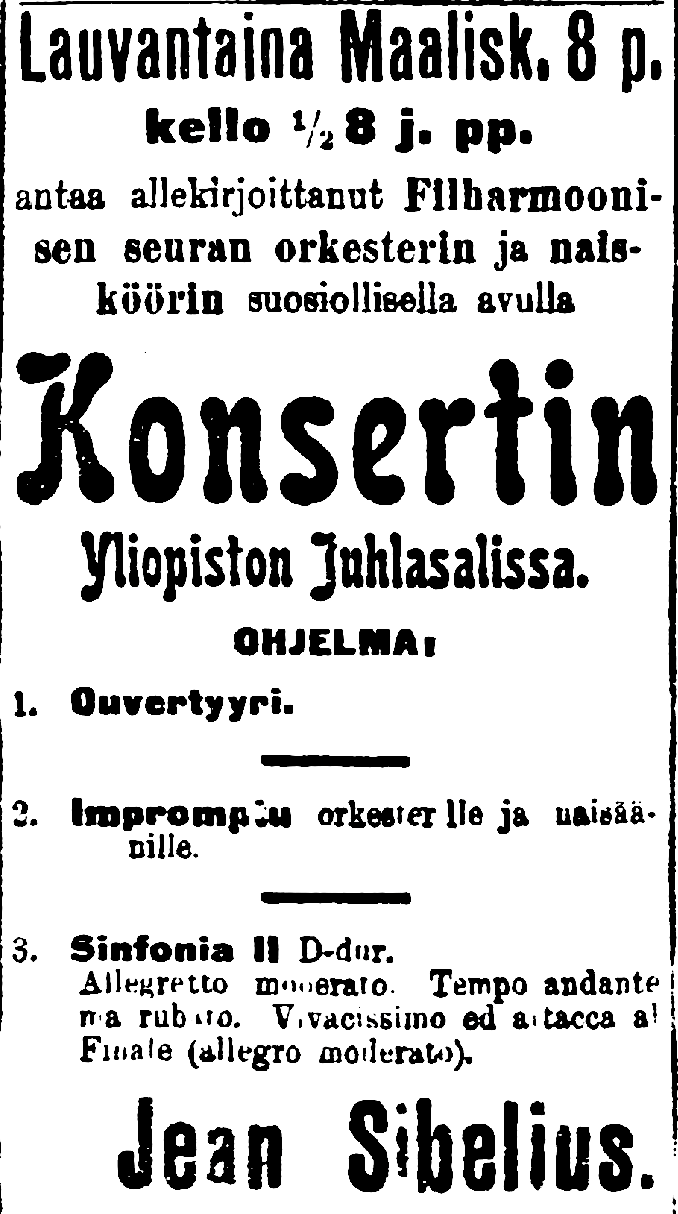
Newspaper advertisement (in Finnish) from Uusi Suometar for the premiere of the Overture

== Instrumentation ==
The Overture in A minor is scored for the following instruments, organized by family (woodwinds, brass, percussion, and strings):

- 2 flutes, 2 oboes, 2 clarinets, and 2 bassoons
- 4 horns, 4 trumpets, 2 trombones, and 1 tuba
- Timpani
- Violins (I and II), violas, cellos, and double basses

== Discography ==
The Estonian-American conductor Neeme Järvi and the Gothenburg Symphony Orchestra made the world premiere studio recording of the Overture in A minor (then still in manuscript) in 1987 for BIS. The table below lists this and other commercially available recordings:

No.	Conductor	Ensemble	Rec. (Note: Refers to the year in which the performers recorded the work; this may not be the same as the year in which the recording was first released to the general public.)	Time	Recording venue	Label	Ref.
1	Neeme Järvi	Gothenburg Symphony Orchestra	1987	6:26	Gothenburg Concert Hall	BIS	(Note: N. Järvi–BIS (CD–372) 1987)
2	Atso Almila	Kuopio Symphony Orchestra	1998	7:01	Kuopio Music Centre	Finlandia	(Note: A. Almila–Finlandia (3984–23391–2) 1999)
3	Osmo Vänskä	Lahti Symphony Orchestra	2002	9:13	Sibelius Hall	BIS	(Note: O. Vänskä–BIS (CD–1265) 2004)
4	Leif Segerstam	Turku Philharmonic Orchestra	2014	6:58	Turku Concert Hall	Naxos	(Note: L. Segerstam–Naxos (8.573299) 2015)

== Notes, references, and sources ==
Notes

Sources

- Barnett, Andrew (2007). Sibelius. New Haven: Yale University Press. ISBN 978-0-300-11159-0.
- Dahlström, Fabian [in Swedish] (2003). Jean Sibelius: Thematisch-bibliographisches Verzeichnis seiner Werke [Jean Sibelius: A Thematic Bibliographic Index of His Works] (in German). Wiesbaden: Breitkopf & Härtel. ISBN 3-7651-0333-0.
