= Viktor Kosenko =

Ukrainian composer, pianist, and educator (1896–1938)

- Віктор Косенко
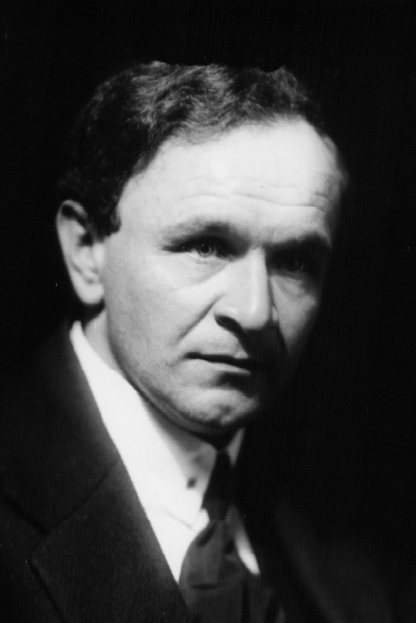
- Kosenko in c. 1934
- Born: 23 November 1896; Saint Petersburg, Russian Empire
- Died: 3 October 1938 (aged 41); Kyiv, Ukrainian SSR, Soviet Union
- Occupations: Composer, pianist, educator
- Known for: Founder of the Mykola Leontovych Musical Society

Viktor Stepanovych Kosenko (Ukrainian: Віктор Степанович Косенко; 23 November [O.S. 11 November] 1896 – 3 October 1938) was a Ukrainian composer, pianist, and educator. He was regarded by his contemporaries as a master of lyricism.

Kosenko's life is conclusively divided into three distinct phases, in Warsaw, where he studied with renowned teacher Aleksander Michałowski, in Zhytomyr, where he began teaching piano and music theory at the Music Technicum, later becoming director of the Zhytomyr Music School, and finally in Kyiv, where he devoted more time to symphonic compositions such as his Heroic Overture, which brought him due recognition in the world of Soviet music.

Kosenko's music combines a post-romantic idiom with intonations of Slavic folk songs and Western-European influences. His vocal, chamber and symphonic works are among the most important pieces of that time in USSR.

== Life and career ==
=== Early life and education ===
Viktor Stepanovych Kosenko was born on 23 November 1896 in Saint Petersburg, into the large family of a major general, Stepan Kosenko. Viktor's family moved from Saint Petersburg to Warsaw in 1898, where later he would encounter the best of world musical classics while listening to the performance of musicians such as Fritz Kreisler, Ferruccio Busoni, and Pablo Casals. His mother Leopolda played the piano, sang, and composed, and the boy grew hearing Ukrainian and Russian folk songs, and musical compositions by Frédéric Chopin, and Johannes Brahms.

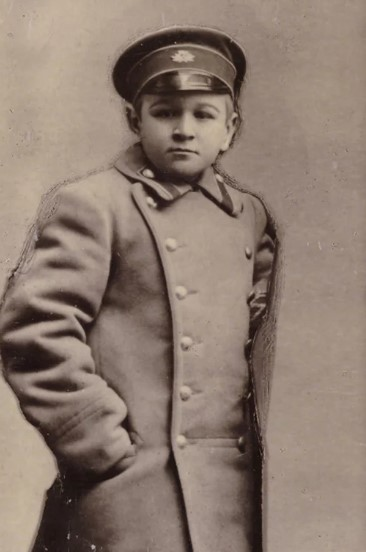
Viktor Kosenko as a schoolboy at the Warsaw Gymnasium

When Kosenko was about five or six, he began to pick out familiar melodies on the piano, as he had absolute pitch and a good musical memory. He attempted to improvise, showing signs of his musical potential. At nine, he could play Beethoven's Pathétique Sonata from memory, as he heard his older sister Maria practicing it. She gave her brother his first piano lessons. His formal music education began in 1905, with private piano lessons from a professor Yudytskiy, with whom he studied for two years. From 1908, he studied under Aleksander Michałowski, a professor at the Warsaw Conservatory.

In the summer of 1914, Kosenko was preparing to enter the Warsaw Conservatory to study piano. However, the outbreak of World War I forced his family to move to Saint Petersburg. In 1915, he was admitted to the upper-division piano class at the Saint Petersburg Conservatory, where he amazed the committee members by his ability to read a score, put it aside, and then play from memory. He also demonstrated a natural aptitude for musical transposition.

Kosenko continued studying composition and music theory under the composer Mikhail Sokolovsky, (Note: Sokolovsky was himself a pupil of Nikolai Rimsky-Korsakov.) piano with Iryna Miklashovskaya, and playing as concertmaster at the Mariinsky Theatre. (Note: Russian composer Alexander Glazunov, director of the conservatory at the time Kosenko was a student, freed him from paying tuition fees after finding out that he was working as accompanist at the Mariinsky Theater for financial reasons.) During this time, he received positive evaluations from Alexander Glazunov, director of the institution, who wrote that Kosenko had "great pianistic and compositional abilities, and perfect pitch". (Note: Original Russian translated text: "Прекрасные пианистические и композиторские способности, абсолютный слух.") Miklashovskaya described him as a "talented musician, very modest and well-behaved." (Note: Original Russian translated text: "талантливый музыкант, очень скромний и хорошо воспитанный.") During his studies, Kosenko wrote symphonic poems, and preludes and mazurkas for the piano. His music during this period is characterized with stylistic musical characteristics of Romantic and post-romantic directions, which features a combination of the European tradition with a national Ukrainian element.

=== Zhytomyr ===
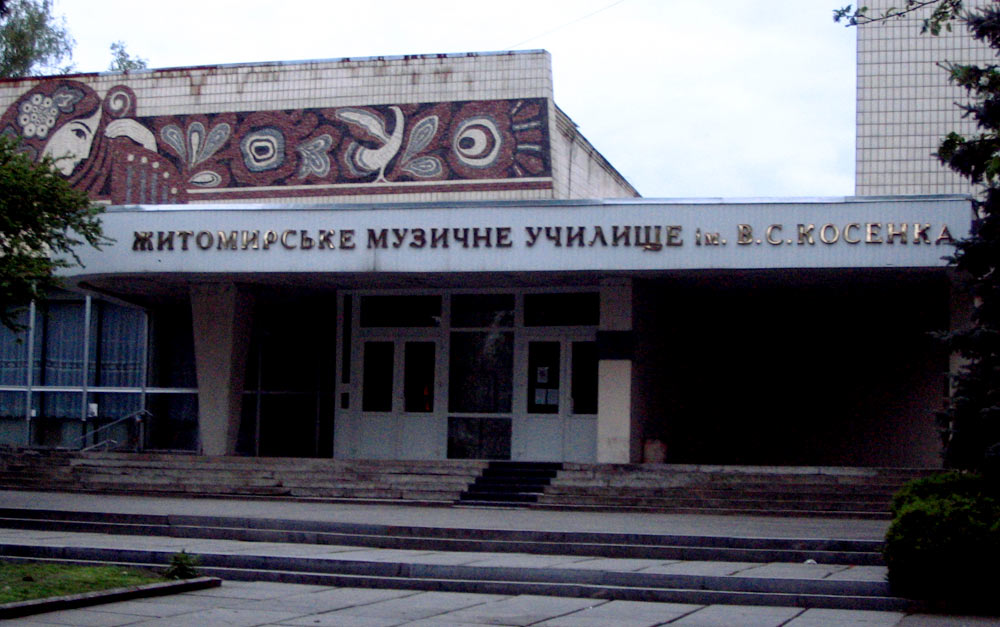
Zhytomyr Music College, today named after Viktor Kosenko.

After graduating from the conservatory in 1918 Kosenko joined his family in Zhytomyr, at that time the cultural center of the Volyn province. The following year he began teaching piano classes and music theory at the Music Technicum, (Note: The Music Technicum is a musical institution that would be named after him from 1938.) later becoming director of the Zhytomyr Music School. In February 1920, Kosenko married Angelina Kanepp. (Note: Angelina was older than Kosenko and already had two children, named Raisa and Iryna, from her first marriage.) His love and deep admiration for her was such that he used to write to her almost every day and was disappointed if for any reason she could not reply to him as fast as he wished. The pieces created between 1919 and 1924 convey deep lyrical feelings, hence the reason he dedicated almost all of his output to her.

In September 1922, Kosenko gave his first concert, attended by his family and close friends, traveling to Moscow the following year to meet with composers and musicians. By this time he was allowed by the Russian Association of Proletarian Musicians to have his first piano compositions published.

This period that Kosenko spend in Zhytomyr was one of the richest in his musical career for he perfected his own artistic style in instrumental, vocal and chamber music; genres in which he was very active at that time. There, he authored a large number of piano pieces, over twenty romances, violin and cello sonatas, works for children, and music for plays. He was also heavily involved in a myriad of musical activities such as the creation of a music society, concert appearances, the organization of his piano chamber trio, vocal quartets and even a symphony orchestra, besides serving as accompanist player for different ensembles in the musical life of the city.

==== Compositional debut ====
In 1921, Kosenko and his fellow musicians founded the Leontovych Musical Society. (Note: According to the memoirs of opera singer Zoia Gaidai, this group of artists, which primarily consisted of peasants, workers and soldiers, helped popularize Russian piano music.) In September 1922, he gave his debut in Zhytomyr, performing his own compositions. Two years later, he was invited to Moscow for a recital at the Association for Contemporary Music, where he met with composers and musicians. During this period, Kosenko's piano works were published for the first time. He then performed as a virtuoso pianist in recitals and formed a piano trio along with violinist Volodymyr Skorokhod and cellist Vasyly Kolomyitsev, giving over one hundred free concerts throughout Ukrainian SSR between 1923 and 1929.

In 1927, Kosenko was invited by the Association of the Proletarian Musicians of Ukrainian SSR to give a concert in Kharkiv, the capital of the Ukrainian SSR at the time. This same association invited him again in 1928 and 1929. Kosenko began giving concerts in Kharkiv, Kyiv, Dnipropetrovsk, Luhansk, and nearby cities. The programme of the concerts included compositions by Ukrainian composers Borys Lyatoshynsky, Levko Revutsky, and Pylyp Kozytskiy.

=== Kyiv ===
Creative conflicts with the new Stalin regime prompted his move to Kyiv, where he was offered a position at the Mykola Lysenko Institute of Music and Drama as a chamber musician and musical analyst in 1929, followed by a promotion to music professor in 1932. Kosenko originally taught piano and chamber ensemble classes, and a year later, he also began teaching a specialized course on analysis of form in both the historical-theoretical and compositional departments. (Note: Some of Kosenko's students included Nikolai Chaikin, Alexander Mihailovich Sandler and Hryhory Kytasty.) The school was later reorganized, the music classes being transferred to the Kyiv Conservatory, where he taught from 1934 to 1937, while the rest of the school became the National University of Theatre, Film and TV. However, during this time, he did not abandon his performing and composing activity, which he loved so much.

He was often invited to be in the juries of musical performance competitions as a well-known performer and respected pedagogue. This included a trip to Moscow in 1931, Kharkiv in 1933, and Leningrad in 1934. This period became a time of mature work for Kosenko, who had established himself in the world of Soviet music. His output began to include new genres, particularly his Heroic Overture for symphony orchestra. Kosenko also arranged Ukrainian folk songs and in 1936, the first compilation of Soviet folk songs was arranged with his participation.

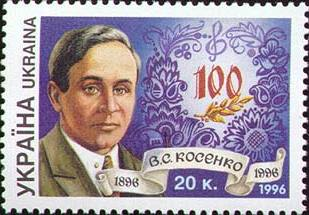
Kosenko, honored on a postage stamp of Ukraine issued in 1996.

Kosenko spent most of his life in Zhytomyr, living in poverty, to which he seemed largely indifferent. After being persuaded by the Soviet government of the time to share his living quarters with members of other families, and frequently bringing in people from the streets to whom he gave food and money, he was given a small three-room apartment on the second floor of an old building at Mikhaila street in Kyiv, to where they all moved thanks to his wife's insistent requests to the Soviet Ukrainian Government in order to recognize Kosenko's efforts in popularizing genuine Ukrainian national music. Finally in 1938, the sick Kosenko was personally awarded the Order of the Red Banner of Labour by the first secretary of the Communist Party of Ukraine, Nikita Khrushchev.

Despite the medical treatment that he was receiving at the time, Kosenko lived for only 42 years, dying on 3 October 1938 of kidney cancer, a condition apparently linked to the unsanitary conditions in which he and his family had lived for so long. His wife Angelina continued to promote his music long after his death. Kosenko left for posterity his unfinished opera Marina, and dozens of works such as his Twenty-four Pieces for Children, Op. 25, composed in 1936, a treasury of teaching which made Kosenko one of the first successful Soviet Ukrainian composers in children's music.

== Music ==
Kosenko's vocal compositions include a large number of ballads, choral and folk arrangements as well. He composed over 100 compositions for piano among waltzes, preludes, nocturnes, sonatas and mazurkas, in a total of about 250 musical works such as his symphonic Moldavian poem, violin and piano concertos, trios and string quartets during his short musical career.

=== Style ===
During his time as professor of the Kyiv Conservatory and the composition of his symphonic Moldavian poem, which he never heard performed, Kosenko was already deeply interested in learning and gathering information on Moldavian folk-music. Being a cross between the late-Romantic period and the national musical style of his country, his music shows no direct indication that any specific folk song was used in his compositions. Kosenko used then melodies, harmonies, dorian, lydian and phrygian modes, so linking his work with Ukrainian folk tunes. Some of these elements involved doubling melodies in thirds, sixths and tenths, using "open" fifths, and pedal points.

=== Children's music ===
Kosenko dedicated much of his attention to children. During the 1930s, part of his output was focused on the most demanding and impartial audience. His first compositions for children, entitled Four Pieces for Children for piano (1930), were written specifically for the Ukrainian Soviet piano repertoire, demonstrating his understanding of child psychology and deep knowledge of the main objectives of a teacher. Next was his Collection of Children's Pieces for piano (1930). His Twenty-four Pieces for Children for piano (1936) followed, becoming one of the most popular collections for children.

=== Reception ===
Kosenko's compositional talent was recognized early on. As a student of the Saint Petersburg Conservatory, the young composer's main focus was to become a performing pianist, only composing music when he was required to do so in theory classes. However, this changed when professor Mikhail Sokolovsky singled out Kosenko's romance "Careless wind" set to text of Konstantin Balmont as an example of his students' work. Glazunov also noted the talent of the composition. This situation inspired Kosenko to study theory of composition, analysis of musical form, and instrumentation in more depth. He consequently began to spend more time composing.

Kosenko debuted his music in Zhytomyr in 1922. To expand his horizons, he travelled to Moscow in 1924, where he met Nikolai Myaskovsky, Alexander Goedicke, and Felix Blumenfeld, who supported the young composer. There his works were published for the first time.

In Kyiv, the composer's circle of artistic acquaintances grew. He became closer to artists such as composers Borys Lyatoshynsky and Levko Revutskiy, and singers Ivan Patrozhynskiy and Maria Litvinenko-Volhemut who all highly evaluated both his musical and pedagogical activity. Levko Revutskiy wrote, "Kosenko is a true master of high culture. He belongs to artists, around whom is created an artistic atmosphere, which is a living, momentous and active stimulus for creative work." (Note: Original Ukrainian quote: "Косенко — справжній майстер високої культури. Він належить до художників, навколо яких створюється та мистецька атмосфера, яка є живим, важливим і дійовим стимулом для творчої роботи.") Ukrainian Soviet writer Pavlo Tychyna, whose work Kosenko also set to music, highly valued the artistic contributions of the composer, saying of him: "The reflection of his creative soul has permanently left sunny illuminations on my biography." (Note: Original Ukrainian quote: "Відсвіт від його творчої душі, — говорив П. Тичина, — назавжди сонячними освітленнями лишився й на моїй біографії".)

The government of Soviet Ukraine valued Kosenko. In 1935, he gave a radio concert of his compositions live from his apartment. Following his death in 1938, a complete collection of his works was published. He was a leading figure among the broad-minded artistic collective of 20th-century Soviet music.

== Pianistic career ==
=== Influences and style ===
Kosenko was popular not only as a composer, but also as an outstanding pianist who had a wide range of activity. When he began his career in Zhytomyr, he was recognized as a virtuoso when he began to invest time into performing, both as a soloist and accompanist, besides composing and teaching. His contemporaries noted his playing style, brilliant technique, powerful artistic interpretation.

He was influenced by the musical environment in which he grew up. Because his mother and sister played piano, he was exposed to the piano music of Frédéric Chopin, Ludwig van Beethoven, Pyotr Ilyich Tchaikovsky, and Franz Schubert. His first compositions were markedly influenced by the works of composers such as Alexander Scriabin, Pyotr Ilyich Tchaikovsky, Sergei Rachmaninoff, and his compatriot Mykola Lysenko.

Aleksander Michałowski, Kosenko's piano teacher in Warsaw, was another major influence on him during his youth. With him Kosenko studied the music of Johann Sebastian Bach, Wolfgang Amadeus Mozart, Frédéric Chopin, and many other romantic-era composers. Michałowski also encouraged Kosenko to play in ensembles. Further early influences on Kosenko happened in Warsaw, where he attended the opera house and a variety a concerts, listening to performances by pianists Ferruccio Busoni, Josef Hofmann, and Sergei Rachmaninoff, and the singing of Feodor Chaliapin, Leonid Sobinov, Antonina Nezhdanova, and Solomiya Krushelnytska. By the time he applied to study piano at the Saint Petersburg Conservatory, he began to be noted for his sight-reading and transposition abilities.

Kosenko's reputation as a concert pianist brought him invitations to take part as juror in piano competitions around the Soviet Union. He also became a piano professor, teaching specialized piano and chamber ensemble classes in Kyiv, first at the Mykola Lysenko Institute of Music and Drama, and later at the Kyiv Conservatory.

=== Ensemble performances ===
Kosenko organized a piano trio with violinist Volodymyr Skorokhod and cellist Vasyly Kolomyitsev, thus gaining popularity as a performer. The group gave over one hundred free concerts all around the Zhytomyr area, playing pieces by Mikhail Glinka, Anton Rubinstein, Sergei Taneyev, Alexander Gretchaninov, Georgy Catoire, and Robert Schumann. With the addition of other musicians they began performing the quartets, quintets and sextets of Alexander Borodin, Joseph Haydn, Johann Nepomuk Hummel, Antonín Dvořák and others as well. He also performed as soloist in piano concertos of Tchaikovsky, Rachmaninoff, Chopin, and Grieg with an orchestra made up of local instrumentalists.

=== Repertoire and performances ===
Along with the European classics, Kosenko was also engaged in popularizing Russian and Ukrainian music by such composers as Levko Revutsky, Boris Lyatoshinsky, Mykhailo Verykivskiy, and Pylyp Kozytskiy, thus gaining the sympathy of the Ukrainian Soviet government. When he debuted his own music to the public in 1922, his concert was divided into two sections. In the first, the programme consisted of music by Frédéric Chopin and Franz Liszt, and in the second he performed his own compositions, which remained as part of his repertoire in many subsequent concerts.

During time in Saint Petersburg, Kosenko worked at the Mariinsky Theatre as an accompanist. Upon graduation from the conservatory, he moved to the capital of the Volhynian Governorate, Zhytomyr, where besides composing and teaching, he invested a lot of time into performing, both as a soloist and accompanist as well.

Following the successful debut of his music, Kosenko began to make many trips to perform his own music to places such as Kharkiv, Dnipropetrovsk, Luhansk, and Moscow. In 1928, he accepted an offer from the Philharmonic of Soviet Ukraine to do a tour with singer Oksana Kolodub to the Donbas area. Following his move to Kyiv, he continued to actively perform. He gave his last concert in 1935, when he performed his own music with bass singer Ivan Patrozhynskiy and soprano Maria Litvinenko-Volhemut. The concert was broadcast live on the radio from his apartment on Pidval'na street.

== Selected works ==
=== Orchestral ===
- Heroic Overture (1932)
- Moldavian Poem (1937)

=== Concertante ===
- Violin Concerto (1919)
- Piano Concerto (1928)

=== Chamber music ===
- Sonata for cello and piano, Op. 10 (1923)
- Sonata for violin and piano (1927)
- Classical Trio (1927)
- Sonata for viola and piano (1928)

=== Songs, choruses, and folk-song arrangements ===
- I'm Sad (1922)
- Speak, speak (1922)
- I Am Here, Inezilya (1936)

=== Piano ===
- Three Preludes, Op. 1 (1910–15)
- Four Preludes, Op. 2 (1911–15)
- Three Mazurkas, Op. 3 (1916–23)
- Eleven Études for Piano, Op. 8 (1922–23)
- Three Pieces for Piano, Op. 9 (1921)
- Three Pieces for Piano, Op. 11 (1921)
- Two Poem Legends, Op. 12 (1921)
- Sonata for Piano No. 1 in B♭ minor, Op. 13 (1922)
- Sonata for Piano No. 2 in C♯ minor, Op. 14 (1924)
- Sonata for Piano No. 3 in B minor, Op. 15 (1926–29)
- Eleven Études in the Form of Old Dances, Op. 19 (1922–23)
- Two Concert Waltzes, Op. 22 (1931)
- Twenty-four Pieces for Children, Op. 25 (1936)

=== Film scores ===
- The Last Port (1934)

=== Recordings ===
- Piano Music Vol. 1, Eleven Etudes in the Form of Old Dances, Op. 19 Natalya Shkoda – Toccata Classics
- Viktor Kosenko: Piano Music Vol. 2, The Complete Piano Sonatas / Natalya Shkoda – Centaur Records
- Violin Concerto: Orchestrated by Alexei Gorokhov, Kyiv Chamber Orchestra. Alexei Gorokhov (conductor & violin) – Melodiya (1980)
- Violin Concerto: Orchestrated by Heorhiy Maiboroda, Symphony Orchestra of the National Radio Company of Ukraine. Anatoly Bazhenov, Volodymyr Sirenko
- Slavic Nobility: Alexander Scriabin – Viktor Kosenko (piano works: Poemes, Mazurkas, Sonatas), by Violina Petrychenko, Ars Produktion, Naxos Library catalogue No.: ARS38153
- Ukrainian Moods – Piano Miniatures (Piano works: Lev Revuskij, Viktor Kosenko, Mykola Kolessa, Igor Schamo, Yurij Schamo, by Violina Petrychenko) Ars Produktion – ARS 38 195

== See also ==
- List of compositions by Viktor Kosenko
- Victor Kosenko Museum
