= Victor Kosenko Museum =

Apartment Museum in Kyiv, Ukraine

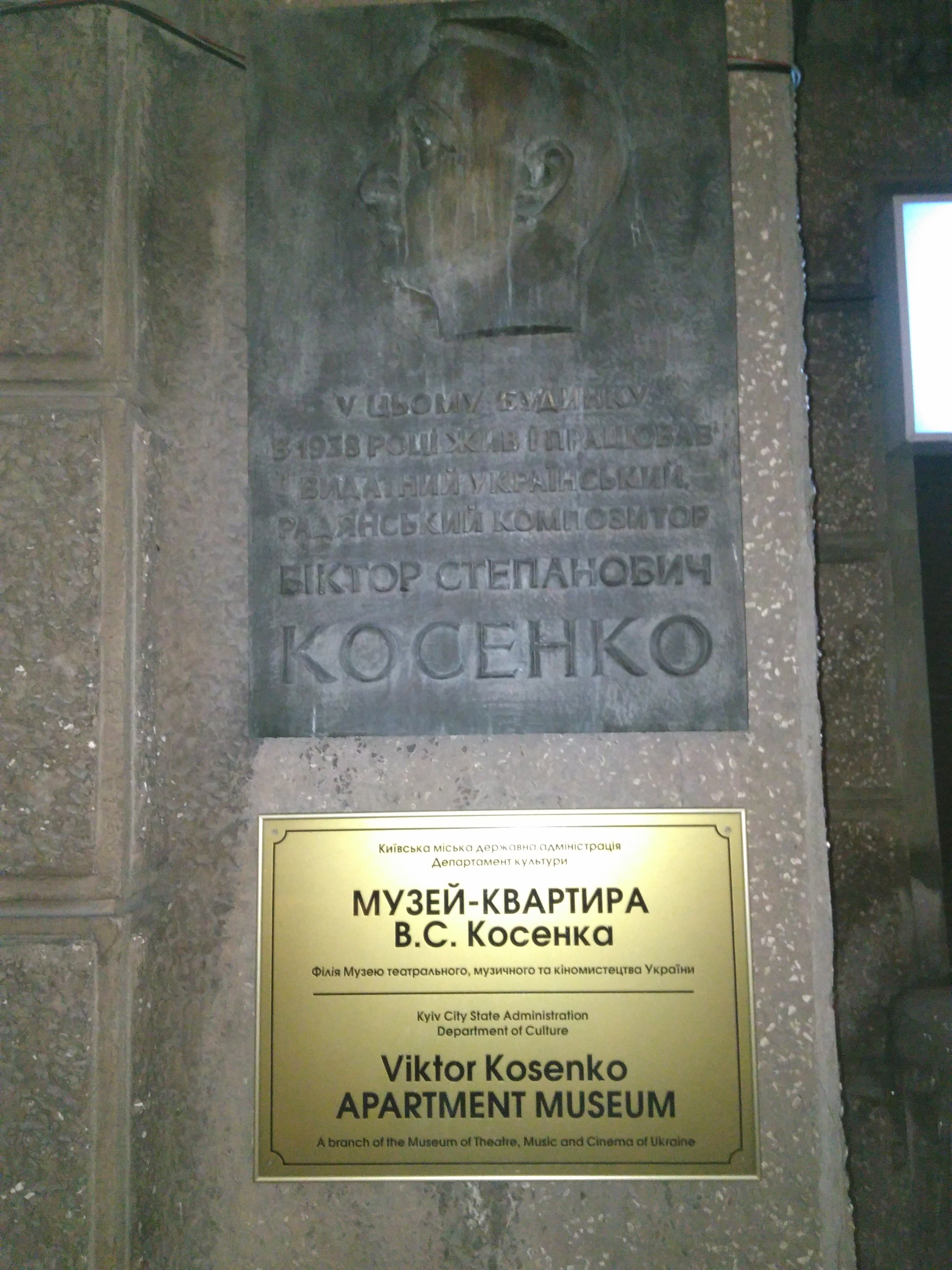
- Established: 1938
- Location: 9 Mykhailo Kotsyubynskoho Street, Kyiv, Ukraine
- Coordinates: 50.44573189°N 30.50341981°E
- Type: Biographical museum, music museum

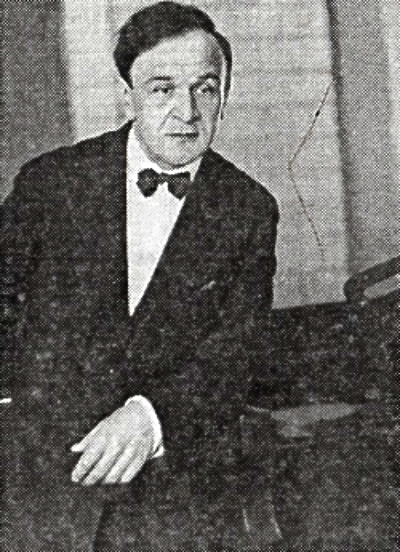
Viktor Kosenko

The Victor Kosenko Apartment Museum (Ukrainian: Музей-квартира Віктора Косенка) is a museum in Kyiv, Ukraine, which memorializes the life of Victor Kosenko, who was a prominent Ukrainian musician, teacher, and public figure in the early 20th century. The museum opened in 1938, the year of his death, and is housed in the building in which Kosenko lived in the last few months of his life from 11 May 1938 to 3 October 1938.

The museum is maintained in its original 1930s style and is a popular tourist destination in the city. In addition, the building is used by the local Union of Composers to host concerts, lectures, and meetings. More than five thousand exhibits are kept in the apartment.

== History ==
The museum first opened in 1938. It operated in an unofficial and honorary capacity until 1964, when it was designated as a memorial building. In 2007, the museum was officially designated as an apartment-museum, a status which it maintains today.
