= Twenty-four Pieces for Children =

1936 romantic piano composition

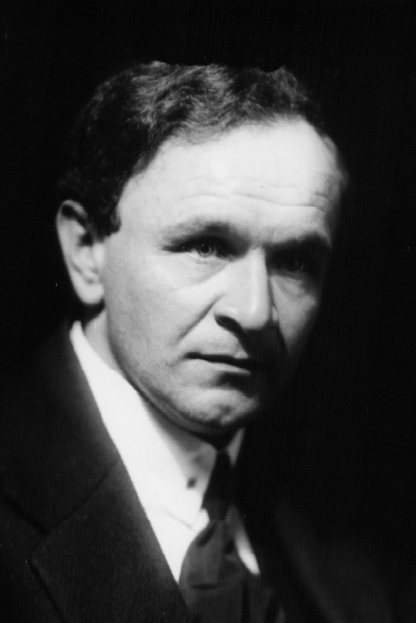
Viktor Kosenko in c. 1934

Twenty-four Pieces for Children (also 24 Pieces for Children), Op. 25, is a 1936 romantic piano composition written in all twenty-four major and minor tonalities by Ukrainian pianist and composer Viktor Kosenko. Naturally treated with techniques of folk polyphony, it was published as Op. 15 in 1938, but later corrected by the publisher of his collection Musiczna Ukraina. It is still an obligatory set of compositions specifically for children learning the piano in conservatoires and piano schools across the country by holding a significant place in today's Ukrainian pedagogical repertoire as one of the most popular collections for children.

== Description ==
No.	Name	Key	Tempo	Score
1	Petroushka	C major	Allegro mosso	
2	After a Butterfly	A minor	Presto	
3	Pioneer's Song	G major	Allegro alla marcia	
4	Ukrainian Folk Song	E minor	Moderato	
5	On the Edge of the Forest	D major	Allegro moderato	
6	Waltz	B minor	Tempo di Valse lento	
7	Morning in the Orchard	A major	Allegro vivace	
8	They Don't Want to Buy a Teddy Bear	F♯ minor	Moderato	
9	They Have Bought a Teddy Bear	E major	Prestissimo	
10	Polka	C♯ minor	Allegro gusto	
11	Pastorale	B major	Andante	
12	Melody	G♯ minor	Andantino cantabile	
13	In March!	G♭ major	Allegro marciale	
14	Little Rain	E♭ minor	Allegro scherzando	
15	Lullaby	D♭ major	Moderato	
16	Étude	B♭ minor	Allegro molto	
17	Little Jumping-rope	A♭ major	Allegro vivo	
18	Ballet Scene	F minor	Allegretto scherzando	
19	Humoresque	E♭ major	Allegro non troppo	
20	Mazurka	C minor	Allegretto semplice	
21	Pljasovaja Dance	B♭ major	Allegro mosso	
22	Fairytale	G minor	Allegro commodo	
23	Young Budyonnovs' March	F major	Allegro marciale	
24	Toccatina	D minor	Allegro di molto	

== See also ==
- List of compositions by Viktor Kosenko
