= The Last Port =

1935 film by Arnold Kordyum

- Directed by: Arnold Kordyum
- Based on: The Death of the Squadron by Alexander Korneychuk
- Music by: Viktor Kosenko
- Production company: Ukrainfilm
- Release date: January 19, 1935
- Language: Silent

The Last Port (Russian: Последнии порта; Ukrainian: Oстанні порти) is a monophonic black-and-white film written and directed by filmmaker Arnold Kordyum (1890–1969) after Alexander Korneychuk's 1933 play The Death of the Squadron (Gibel eskadry). Produced by Ukrainfilm in 1934 to be released on 19 January 1935, it starred Pyotr Masokha (1904–1991), Sergei Minin (1901–1937) and Ladislav Golichenko, with film score by Viktor Kosenko.

== Plot summary ==
On the struggle of the communist sailors with the White Guards and the German occupiers in the Crimea during the civil war.

== Cast ==
- Sergei Minin as Commissioner of the Black Sea Fleet
- Pavel Kiyansky as Naval officer
- Pyotr Masokha as Envoy of the Baltic Fleet
- N. Bukaev as Sailor with a bandage
- Arnold Kordyum as Sailor with accordion
- Luka Lyashenko as Sailor from Priluk
- I. Marx as Old worker
- Lydia Ostrovskaya-Kurdyum as Working woman
- Dmitri Erdman as Lieutenant
- Pavel Petrik as German officer (as P. Petrik)
- A. Doroshkevich as Petliurist
- Mikhail Gornatko as Interventionist commissioner
- Stepan Shagaida as Admiral
- L. Golichenko as Sterna — boatswain
- Mikhail Gayvoronsky as Aleksandr Zapolsky
- Boris Karlash-Verbitsky as Sailor
- A. Kerner
