= Eleven Études in the Form of Old Dances =

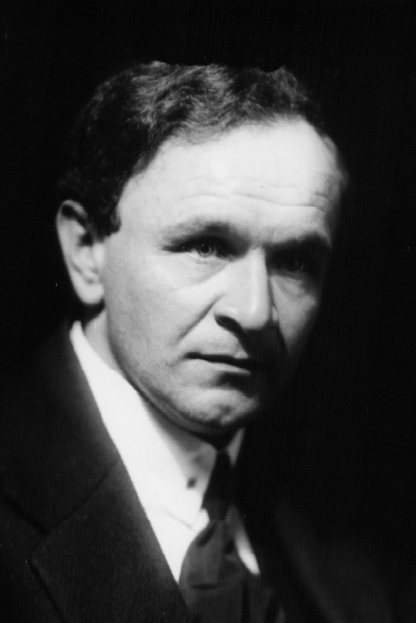
Viktor Kosenko in c. 1934

Eleven Études in the Form of Old Dances (also 11 Études in the Form of Old Dances), Op. 19, written specifically for educational purposes between 1928 and 1930 by Ukrainian pianist and composer Viktor Kosenko, is a late-romantic collection of solo piano pieces mingled with elements of Ukrainian folk-like melodies, using French-baroque dance forms such as minuet, allemande, courante, sarabande, and gavotte as concept.

Consisting of eleven pieces, among them the melodic gavotte, the two-part Bourrée, and the Gigue in sonata form, the collection presents many technical challenges such as the use of overlapping octaves, doubling in thirds and sixths, and pedaling. It was once described by Kosenko as a 'family album' with each piece dedicated to a member of his family such as his nephew Fedir, to whom Rigaudon was dedicated, and his wife Anna who was the dedicatée of the eighteen-minute long Passacaglia. They were first published in 1930 (K[yivske] muz[ychne] pidpryemstvo).

== Études ==
The eleven études are shown below.

Eleven Études in the Form of Old Dances, Op. 19, 1928–30
	Name	Key	Tempo	Score
1	Gavotte	D♭ major	Allegro mosso	
2	Allemande	B♭ minor	Moderato	
3	Menuet	G major	Allegretto	
4	Courante	E minor	Vivace	
5	Sarabande	A minor	Adagio	
6	Bourrée	A major	Allegro	
7	Gavotte	B minor	Allegro moderato	
8	Rigaudon	C major	Vivace	
9	Menuet	E♭ major	Allegretto	
10	Passacaglia	G minor	Andante con grandezza	
11	Gigue	D minor	Presto	

== See also ==
- List of compositions by Viktor Kosenko
