= Impromptu (Sibelius) =

Choral piece with orchestra by Jean Sibelius

- Choral piece by Jean Sibelius
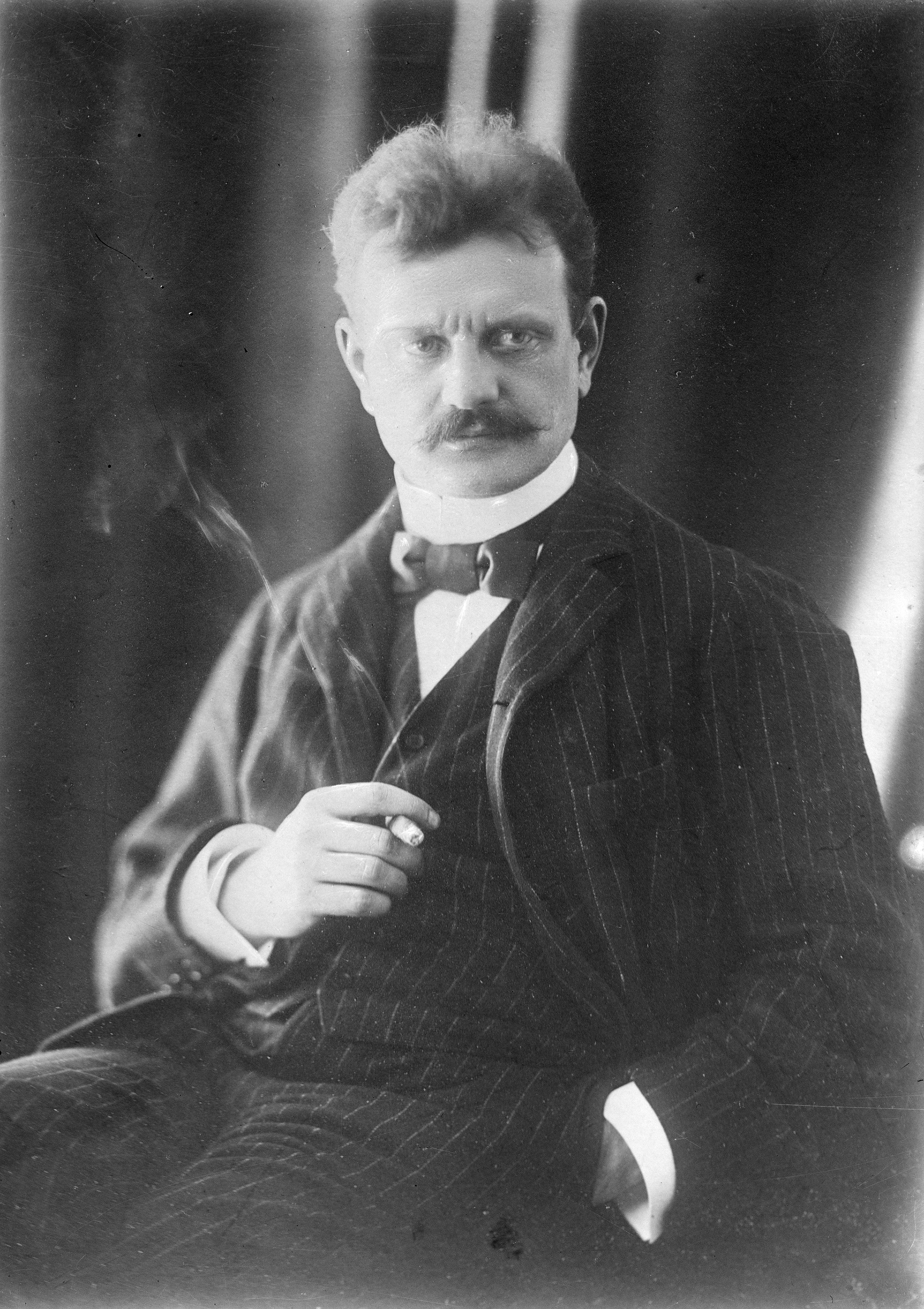
- The composer (c. 1902)
- Opus: 19
- Text: Unge hellener and Bacchospräster; by Viktor Rydberg
- Language: Swedish
- Composed: 1902
- Publisher: Breitkopf & Härtel (1912)
- Duration: 7 mins. (orig. 6 mins.)

Premiere
- Date: 8 March 1902
- Location: Helsinki, Grand Duchy of Finland
- Conductor: Jean Sibelius
- Performers: Helsinki Philharmonic Society

The Impromptu, Op. 19, is a single-movement work for female choir and orchestra written in 1902 by the Finnish composer Jean Sibelius. The piece, which is a setting of the Swedish poet Viktor Rydberg's poem Unge hellener (Young Hellenics), premiered in Helsinki on 8 March 1902, with Sibelius conducting the Helsinki Philharmonic Society and an amateur choir. The Impromptu was the middle item a program that also included two other first performances: the Overture in A minor (JS 144), which served as the opener; and the Second Symphony (Op. 43).

Sibelius extensively revised the Impromptu in the spring of 1910, reducing the instrumentation and altering both the beginning and ending of the piece, the former of which now incorporated a second Rydberg poem, Bacchospräster (The Priests of Bacchus). This version of the Impromptu received its premiere in Helsinki on 29 March 1912, with Sibelius conducting the Philharmonic Society; "Nuori Laulu" and the Arbetets vänner female choir sang the choral part.

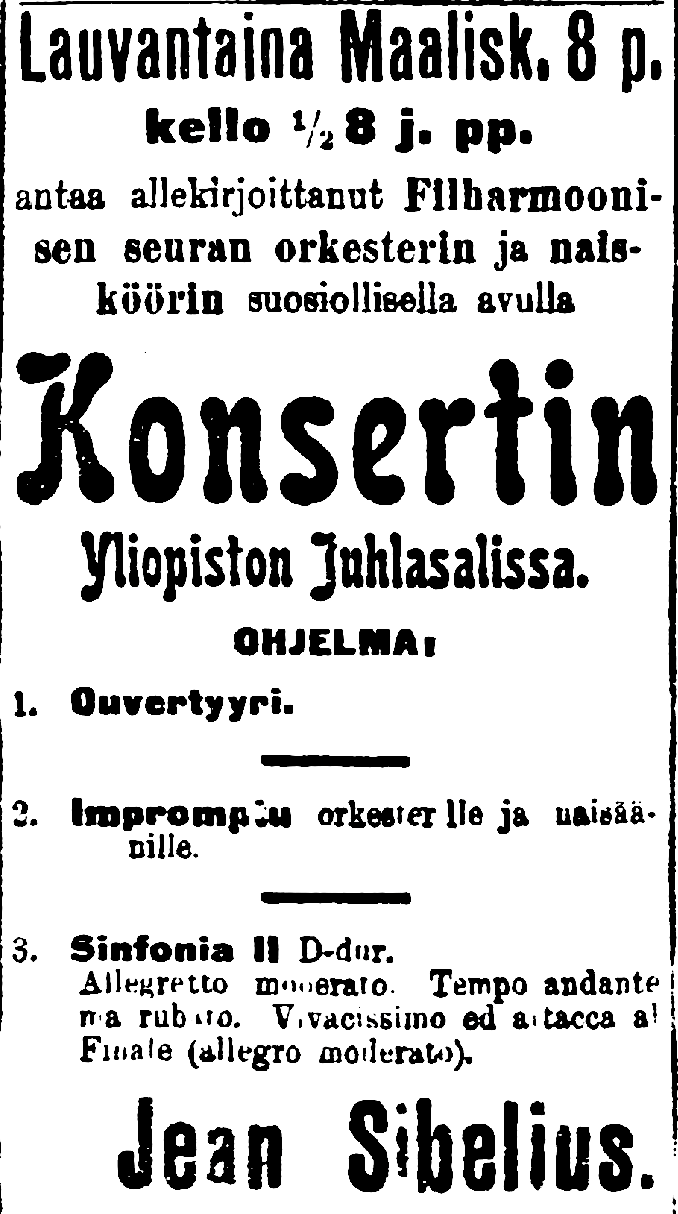
Newspaper advertisement (in Finnish) from Uusi Suometar for the premiere of Jean Sibelius's Impromptu

== Instrumentation ==
The revised version of the Impromptu is scored for the following instruments and voices, organized by family (vocalists, woodwinds, brass, percussion, and strings):

- Female choir (SSAA)
- 2 flutes, 2 oboes, 2 clarinets, and 2 bassoons
- 4 horns
- Timpani and triangle
- Violins (I and II), violas, cellos, double basses, and harp

The original version of the piece called for much larger orchestral forces, including 2 trumpets, cymbals, bass drum, tambourine, and castanets.

== Discography ==
The Estonian conductor Eri Klas and the Finnish National Opera Orchestra made the world premiere studio recording of the Impromptu in 1990 for Ondine. The table below lists this and other commercially available recordings:

No.	Conductor	Ensemble	Chorus	Rec. (Note: Refers to the year in which the performers recorded the work; this may not be the same as the year in which the recording was first released to the general public.)	Time	Recording venue	Label	Ref.
1	Eri Klas	Finnish National Opera Orchestra	Finnish National Opera Chorus	1990	6:59	Roihuvuori Church	Ondine	(Note: E. Klas—Ondine (ODE 754-2) 1990)
2	Osmo Vänskä (1)	Lahti Symphony Orchestra (1)	Dominante Choir (1)	2004	6:57	Sibelius Hall	BIS	(Note: O. Vänskä–BIS (CD–1565) 2006)
†	Osmo Vänskä (2)	Lahti Symphony Orchestra (2)	Dominante Choir (2)	2004	5:27	Sibelius Hall	BIS	

† = original version (1902)

== Notes, references, and sources ==
Notes

Sources

- Barnett, Andrew (2007). Sibelius. New Haven: Yale University Press. ISBN 978-0-300-11159-0.
- Dahlström, Fabian [in Swedish] (2003). Jean Sibelius: Thematisch-bibliographisches Verzeichnis seiner Werke [Jean Sibelius: A Thematic Bibliographic Index of His Works] (in German). Wiesbaden: Breitkopf & Härtel. ISBN 3-7651-0333-0.
