= List of Knight's Cross of the Iron Cross recipients (J) =

The Knight's Cross of the Iron Cross (German: Ritterkreuz des Eisernen Kreuzes) and its variants were the highest awards in the military and paramilitary forces of Nazi Germany during World War II. The Knight's Cross of the Iron Cross was awarded for a wide range of reasons and across all ranks, from a senior commander for skilled leadership of his troops in battle to a low-ranking soldier for a single act of extreme gallantry. A total of 7,321 awards were made between its first presentation on 30 September 1939 and its last bestowal on 17 June 1945. (Note: Großadmiral and President of Germany Karl Dönitz, Hitler's successor as Head of State (Staatsoberhaupt) and Supreme Commander of the Armed Forces, had ordered the cessation of all promotions and awards as of 11 May 1945 (Dönitz-decree). Consequently the last Knight's Cross awarded to Oberleutnant zur See of the Reserves Georg-Wolfgang Feller on 17 June 1945 must therefore be considered a de facto but not de jure hand-out.) This number is based on the analysis and acceptance of the order commission of the Association of Knight's Cross Recipients (AKCR). Presentations were made to members of the three military branches of the Wehrmacht—the Heer (Army), Kriegsmarine (Navy) and Luftwaffe (Air Force)—as well as the Waffen-SS, the Reichsarbeitsdienst (RAD—Reich Labour Service) and the Volkssturm (German national militia). There were also 43 recipients in the military forces of allies of the Third Reich.

These recipients are listed in the 1986 edition of Walther-Peer Fellgiebel's book, Die Träger des Ritterkreuzes des Eisernen Kreuzes 1939–1945 — The Bearers of the Knight's Cross of the Iron Cross 1939–1945. Fellgiebel was the former chairman and head of the order commission of the AKCR. In 1996, the second edition of this book was published with an addendum delisting 11 of these original recipients. Author Veit Scherzer has cast doubt on a further 193 of these listings. The majority of the disputed recipients had received the award in 1945, when the deteriorating situation of Germany in the final days of World War II in Europe left a number of nominations incomplete and pending in various stages of the approval process.

Listed here are the 142 Knight's Cross recipients whose last names start with "J", ordered alphabetically. Fellgiebel himself delisted one and Scherzer has challenged the validity of four more of these listings. The rank listed is the recipient's rank at the time the Knight's Cross was awarded.

== Background ==
The Knight's Cross of the Iron Cross and its higher grades were based on four separate enactments. The first enactment, Reichsgesetzblatt I S. 1573 of 1 September 1939 instituted the Iron Cross (Eisernes Kreuz), the Knight's Cross of the Iron Cross and the Grand Cross of the Iron Cross (Großkreuz des Eisernen Kreuzes). Article 2 of the enactment mandated that the award of a higher class be preceded by the award of all preceding classes. As the war progressed, some of the recipients of the Knight's Cross distinguished themselves further and a higher grade, the Knight's Cross of the Iron Cross with Oak Leaves (Ritterkreuz des Eisernen Kreuzes mit Eichenlaub), was instituted. The Oak Leaves, as they were commonly referred to, were based on the enactment Reichsgesetzblatt I S. 849 of 3 June 1940. In 1941, two higher grades of the Knight's Cross were instituted. The enactment Reichsgesetzblatt I S. 613 of 28 September 1941 introduced the Knight's Cross of the Iron Cross with Oak Leaves and Swords (Ritterkreuz des Eisernen Kreuzes mit Eichenlaub und Schwertern) and the Knight's Cross of the Iron Cross with Oak Leaves, Swords and Diamonds (Ritterkreuz des Eisernen Kreuzes mit Eichenlaub, Schwertern und Brillanten). At the end of 1944 the final grade, the Knight's Cross of the Iron Cross with Golden Oak Leaves, Swords, and Diamonds (Ritterkreuz des Eisernen Kreuzes mit goldenem Eichenlaub, Schwertern und Brillanten), based on the enactment Reichsgesetzblatt 1945 I S. 11 of 29 December 1944, became the final variant of the Knight's Cross authorized.

== Recipients ==
The Oberkommando der Wehrmacht (Supreme Command of the Armed Forces) kept separate Knight's Cross lists for the Heer (Army), Kriegsmarine (Navy), Luftwaffe (Air Force) and Waffen-SS. Within each of these lists a unique sequential number was assigned to each recipient. The same numbering paradigm was applied to the higher grades of the Knight's Cross, one list per grade. Of the 142 awards made to servicemen whose last name starts with "J", 14 were later awarded the Knight's Cross of the Iron Cross with Oak Leaves and two the Knight's Cross of the Iron Cross with Oak Leaves and Swords; 15 presentations were made posthumously. Heer members received 85 of the medals, nine went to the Kriegsmarine, 42 to the Luftwaffe, and six to the Waffen-SS. The sequential numbers greater than 843 for the Knight's Cross of the Iron Cross with Oak Leaves are unofficial and were assigned by the Association of Knight's Cross Recipients (AKCR) and are therefore denoted in parentheses.

This along with the + (plus) indicates that a higher grade of Knight's Cross was awarded as well.
This along with the * (asterisk) indicates that the Knight's Cross was awarded posthumously.
This along with the ! (exclamation mark) indicates that author Walther-Peer Fellgiebel has expressed doubt regarding the veracity and formal correctness of the listing.
This along with the ? (question mark) indicates that author Veit Scherzer has expressed doubt regarding the veracity and formal correctness of the listing.

Name	Service	Rank	Role and unit (Note: For an explanation of the various naming schemes used by the Luftwaffe, Heer, Kriegsmarine and Waffen-SS refer to nomenclature used by the Wehrmacht and Waffen-SS.)	Date of award	Notes	Image
Hans-Joachim Jabs+	Luftwaffe	Oberleutnant	Pilot and Staffel officer in the 2./Zerstörergeschwader 76 (Note: According to Scherzer as pilot in the 2./Zerstörergeschwader 76.)	1 October 1940	Awarded 430th Oak Leaves 24 March 1944	
Eberhard Jacob	Luftwaffe	Hauptmann	Gruppenkommandeur of the III./Sturzkampfgeschwader 3	29 February 1944	—	—
Georg-Rupert Jacob (Note: According to Scherzer name is spelled Georg-Rupert Jakob.)	Luftwaffe	Oberleutnant	Chief of the 1./Fallschirmjäger-Regiment 7	13 September 1944	—	—
Karl-Peter Jacob	Heer	Oberleutnant	Chief of the 2./Gebirgsjäger-Regiment 143	13 June 1941	—	—
Paul Jacob	Heer	Oberleutnant (Note: According to Scherzer as Oberleutnant of the Reserves.)	Deputy leader of the I./Jäger-Regiment 204	10 March 1943	—	—
Fritz Jacobeit	Heer	Gefreiter	Group leader in the 6./Füsilier-Regiment 22	11 March 1945	—	—
Hans-Joachim Jacobi von Wangelin	Luftwaffe	Oberleutnant	Staffelführer of the 1./Kampfgeschwader 77 (Note: According to Scherzer as Staffelführer of the 2./Kampfgeschwader 77.)	19 September 1942	—	—
Martin Jacobs	Heer	Obergefreiter	Group leader in the 2./Grenadier-Regiment 431	26 December 1943	—	—
Fritz Jacoby	Heer	Oberleutnant of the Reserves	Chief of the 7./Panzergrenadier-Regiment 11	3 April 1943*	Killed in action 19 March 1943	—
Egbert Jaeckel	Luftwaffe	Leutnant	Pilot in the 3./Sturzkampfgeschwader 2 "Immelmann"	14 May 1942	—	—
Karl Jäckel! (Note: Walther-Peer Fellgiebel, author of Die Träger des Ritterkreuzes des Eisernen Kreuzes 1939-1945, indicates that Jäckel received the Knight's Cross on 1 June 1945, after the Dönitz-decree prohibited the awarding of the Knight's Cross while other sources such as Clemens Range and Franz Kurowski indicate that the Knight's Cross was awarded on 28 May 1945. According to Fellgiebel Jäckel's paybook confirms his award on 1 June 1945. Thus making him a de facto but not de jure recipient.)	Kriegsmarine	Obersteuermann	Coxswain on U-907	9 May 1945	—	—
Alfred Jaedtke	Heer	Hauptmann	Commander of the I./Panzergrenadier-Regiment 14	21 September 1944	—	
Erich Jäger	Luftwaffe	Oberleutnant	Zugführer (platoon leader) in the I./Flak-Regiment 23 (motorized) (Note: According to Scherzer as chief of the 1./Flak-Regiment 19.)	5 July 1941	—	—
Fritz Jäger? (Note: Fritz Jäger, in connection with the 20 July plot, failed attempt to assassinate Adolf Hitler, was deprived of all honors, ranks and orders and dishonorably discharged from the Heer on 14 August 1944. The civilian Jäger was sentenced to death by the Volksgerichtshof on 21 August 1944 and executed the same day.)	Heer	Major	Commander of the II./Infanterie-Regiment 8	26 May 1940	—	—
Gerhard Jaeger	Heer	Feldwebel	Zugführer (platoon leader) in the 7./Infanterie-Regiment 418	23 February 1942	—	—
Karl-Heinz Jaeger+	Heer	Leutnant of the Reserves	Leader of the 1./Grenadier-Regiment 167	4 August 1943	Awarded 786th Oak Leaves 16 March 1945	—
Dr. med. Rolf Jäger	Luftwaffe	Oberarzt (rank equivalent to Oberleutnant)	Troop doctor in the assault group "Beton" of the Fallschirmjäger-Sturm-Abteilung "Koch" (Battle of Fort Eben-Emael)	13 May 1940 (Note: According to Scherzer on 15 May 1940.)	—	—
Willy Jähde	Heer	Major	Commander of schwere Panzer-Abteilung 502	16 March 1944	—	—
Erhard Jähnert	Luftwaffe	Leutnant	Pilot in the III./Sturzkampfgeschwader 3	18 May 1943	—	—
Adolf Jäkel	Luftwaffe	Oberst	Geschwaderkommodore of Transportgeschwader 1	19 August 1944	—	—
Erwin Jaenecke	Heer	Generalleutnant	Commander of the 389. Infanterie-Division	9 October 1942	—	—
Hans-Joachim Jäschke	Luftwaffe	Oberleutnant	Staffelführer of the 4./Schlachtgeschwader 1 (Note: According to Scherzer as Staffelführer in the II./Schlachtgeschwader 1.)	28 March 1944	—	—
Bruno Jagusch	Heer	Unteroffizier	Panzer commander in the Panzer-Jäger-Kompanie 1349	5 March 1945	—	—
Gunter Jahn	Kriegsmarine	Kapitänleutnant	Commander of U-596	30 April 1943	—	—
Paul Jahncke (Note: According to Scherzer name is spelled Paul Jancke.)	Heer	Oberfeldwebel	Zugführer (platoon leader) in the 1./Panzer-Jäger-Abteilung 53	18 February 1945	—	—
Arthur Jahnke	Heer	Leutnant of the Reserves	Leader of the 5./Grenadier-Regiment 572	20 April 1944	—	—
Arno Jahr	Heer	Generalleutnant	Commander of the 387. Infanterie-Division	22 December 1942	—	—
Maximilian Jais	Heer	Oberst	Commander of Gebirgsjäger-Regiment 141	17 September 1941	—	—
Friedrich Jakob+	Heer	Hauptmann	Leader of the II./Infanterie-Regiment 105	4 March 1942	Awarded 681st Oak Leaves 18 December 1944	—
Georg Jakob+	Luftwaffe	Oberleutnant	Staffelkapitän of the 2./Sturzkampfgeschwader 77	27 April 1942	Awarded 615th Oak Leaves 30 September 1944	—
Willy Jakob	Heer	Unteroffizier	Zugführer (platoon leader) in the 7./Infanterie-Regiment 391	4 March 1942*	Killed in action 27 January 1942	—
Josef Jakwert+	Heer	Oberfeldwebel	Zugführer (platoon leader) in the Divisions-Panzer-Jäger-Kompanie 361 (Note: According to Scherzer as Zugführer (platoon leader) in the Panzer-Jäger-Kompanie 361.)	14 May 1944	Awarded 752nd Oak Leaves 24 February 1945	—
Siegfried Jamrowski	Luftwaffe	Oberleutnant	Chief of the 6./Fallschirmjäger-Regiment 3	9 June 1944	—	
Arthur Jander	Heer	Major	Leader of a Kampfgruppe in the 62. Infanterie-Division	15 June 1943	—	—
Hans Janke	Heer	Oberstleutnant	Commander of Grenadier-Regiment 159	23 February 1944	—	—
Karl Janke	Luftwaffe	Hauptmann	Staffelkapitän of the 7./Sturzkampfgeschwader 2 "Immelmann"	16 November 1942	—	—
Ewald Jannes	Heer	Obergefreiter	In the 9./Panzergrenadier-Regiment 28	30 April 1945	—	—
Ernst Jansa+	Luftwaffe	Oberstleutnant	Commander of Flak(Sturm)Regiment 12 (motorized)	31 October 1944	Awarded 726th Oak Leaves 1 February 1945	—
Willi Jansen	Heer	Oberleutnant (Note: According to Scherzer as Oberleutnant of the Reserves.)	Aide-de-camp in Panzergrenadier-Regiment 128	15 May 1944	—	—
Theodor Jansing	Heer	Unteroffizier	Company troop leader of the 3./Grenadier-Regiment 480	26 January 1944	—	—
Paul-Vincenz Jansky	Heer	Oberleutnant of the Reserves	Chief of the 7./Jäger-Regiment 49	12 August 1944	—	—
Ewald Janssen	Luftwaffe	Major	Geschwaderkommodore of Schlachtgeschwader 4	31 October 1944	—	—
Siegfried Janz	Luftwaffe	Obergefreiter	Group leader of the 1./Jäger-Regiment 42 (L)	5 November 1944	—	—
Fritz Jaquet? (Note: The teleprinter nomination was received by the Heerespersonalamt (HPA—Army Staff Office) from the troop on 27 March 1945. Major Joachim Domaschk approved on 12 April. A HPA-nomination was created on 20 April with the number 5084. The file card in the German Nation Archives two notes stating: "Arrived on 12 April 1945" as well as "Forwarded on 19 April 1945". Scherzer assumes that Fritz Jaquet's unit in parallel to the teleprinter nomination had sent a more detailed nomination via messenger which was received on 12 April. The book Verliehene Ritterkreuze (Awarded Knight Crosses) indicates an arrival date of 14 April 1945 and forwarding date of 19 April. No further information was noted indicating that the Knight's Cross was further processed or awarded. The Order Commission of the Association of Knight's Cross Recipients (AKCR) processed this case in 1982 and decided: "Knight's Cross yes, 8 May 1945". According to the AKCR the award was presented in accordance with the Dönitz-decree. This is illegal according to the Deutsche Dienststelle (WASt) and lacks legal justification. Fellgiebel later moved the presentation date by one day. Jacquet was a member of the AKCR.)	Heer	Leutnant	Adjutant of the I./Grenadier-Regiment 62	9 May 1945	—	—
Alfred Jarosch	Heer	Leutnant	Leader of the 8./Jäger-Regiment 38	24 September 1942	—	—
Erich Jaschinski	Luftwaffe	Oberfeldwebel	Pilot in the I./Transportgeschwader 3	9 February 1945	—	—
Erich Jaschke+	Heer	Oberst	Commander of Infanterie-Regiment 90 (motorized)	4 December 1941	Awarded 295th Oak Leaves 7 September 1943	
Herbert Jaschke	Heer	Hauptmann	Commander of Sturmgeschütz-Brigade 249	23 April 1945	—	—
Franz Jasiek	Heer	Unteroffizier	Zugführer (platoon leader) in the 5./Panzergrenadier-Regiment 5	22 April 1943	—	—
Georg Jass	Heer	Major	Commander of Divisions-Füsilier-Bataillon 30	9 June 1944	—	—
Georg Jauer+	Heer	Generalleutnant	Commander of the 20. Panzergrenadier-Division	4 May 1944	Awarded 733rd Oak Leaves 10 February 1945	—
Georg Jauernik	Luftwaffe	Stabsfeldwebel	Pilot in the II./Sturzkampfgeschwader 77	27 November 1942	—	—
Friedrich Jeckeln+	Waffen-SS	SS-Obergruppenführer and General of the Polizei and Waffen-SS (Note: According to Scherzer as SS-Obergruppenführer and General of the Waffen-SS, Höherer SS- and Polizei and leader of the Höhere SS- und Polizeiführer Northern Russia, leader of Kampfgruppe Jeckeln (lett. Polizei) in the 18. Armee.)	Höherer SS- und Polizeiführer Ostland und Rußland-Nord and leader of a lett. SS-Polizei-Kampfgruppe	27 August 1944	Awarded 802nd Oak Leaves 8 March 1945	
Erich Jeckstat	Luftwaffe	Feldwebel	Pilot in the 1./Kampfgeschwader 100	14 March 1943	—	—
Ernst Jedele	Heer	Oberfeldwebel	Troop leader in the 6./Sturm-Regiment 14	15 April 1944*	Killed in action 8 March 1944	—
Otto Jedermann	Heer	Hauptmann	Commander of the I./Panzergrenadier-Regiment 146	14 May 1944	—	—
Josef Jenatschek	Heer	Leutnant	Leader of the 1./Panzergrenadier-Regiment 14	4 May 1944	—	—
Hans Jenisch	Kriegsmarine	Oberleutnant zur See	Commander of U-32	7 October 1940	—	—
Roland Jenisch	Heer	Oberst of the Reserves	Commander of Grenadier-Regiment 756	9 December 1944	—	—
Peter Jenne	Luftwaffe	Hauptmann	Staffelkapitän of the 12./Jagdgeschwader 300	2 February 1945	—	—
Josef Jennewein	Luftwaffe	Leutnant (Note: According to Scherzer as Oberfeldwebel and pilot in the I./Jagdgeschwader 51 "Mölders".)	Pilot in the 1./Jagdgeschwader 51 "Mölders"	5 December 1943*	Missing in action 26 July 1943	
Karl Jenninger	Heer	Oberleutnant	Chief of the 2./Festungs-Infanterie-Bataillon VI./999	26 November 1944	—	—
Max Jensen	Heer	Feldwebel	Zugführer (platoon leader) in the Stab I./Grenadier-Regiment 502	29 April 1945	—	—
Jakob Jenster	Luftwaffe	Oberfeldwebel	Pilot in the 6./Sturzkampfgeschwader 2 "Immelmann"	29 February 1944	—	—
Heinz Jente	Luftwaffe	Oberleutnant	Staffelkapitän of the 2./Kampfgeschwader 26	29 October 1942	—	—
Walter Jentschke (Note: According to Scherzer name is Walter Jentschke, according to Fellgiebel name is spelled Jenschke, without the letter "t".)	Waffen-SS	SS-Kanonier	Radio troop leader in the 5./SS-Freiwilligen-Artillerie-Regiment 54 "Nederland"	18 December 1944	—	—
Erich Jentzsch	Heer	Feldwebel	Zugführer (platoon leader) in the 4./Grenadier-Regiment 446	8 August 1944*	Missing in action 24 April 1943	—
Hans Jentzsch	Luftwaffe	Hauptmann	Commander of the I./Flak-Regiment 291 (motorized)	25 November 1944	—	—
Wilhelm Jerschke	Heer	Stabsgefreiter	Messenger in the 2./Panzergrenadier-Regiment 12	7 October 1944	—	—
[Prof. Dr.] Hans-Heinrich Jescheck (Note: The brackets around the professor and doctor title [Prof. Dr.] denotes that the academic title was attained after the Knight's Cross of the Iron Cross was awarded)	Heer	Hauptmann of the Reserves	Leader of Panzer-Aufklärungs-Abteilung 118	5 March 1945	—	—
Hans Jeschonnek	Luftwaffe	Generalmajor	Chief of the general staff of the Luftwaffe	27 October 1939	—	
Helmut Jeserer	Heer	Hauptmann	Commander of the II./Sturm-Regiment 215	30 April 1945	—	—
Rudolf Jesse	Kriegsmarine	Oberleutnant zur See of the Reserves	Commander of a Minensuchboot (minesweeper) in the 8. Minensuchflottille	5 September 1944	—	—
Curt von Jesser	Heer	Oberst	Commander of Panzer-Regiment 36	18 January 1942	—	
Ernst Jetting	Heer	Oberfeldwebel	Zugführer (platoon leader) in the 1./Grenadier-Regiment 29 (motorized)	4 June 1944	—	—
Hermann Jobelius	Heer	Major	Commander of the II./Grenadier-Regiment 432	28 February 1945	—	—
Hermann Jochems	Luftwaffe	Oberfeldwebel	Pilot in the Stab/Sturzkampfgeschwader 2 "Immelmann"	3 September 1942	—	—
Hermann-Gustav Jochims	Heer	Hauptmann	Chief of the 7./Grenadier-Regiment 90 (motorized)	19 September 1943	—	
Bernhard Jochimsen	Heer	Unteroffizier of the Reserves (Note: According to Scherzer as Unteroffizier.)	Group leader in the 1./Pionier-Bataillon 290	28 April 1945	—	—
Alfred Jodl+	Heer	Generaloberst	Chef des Wehrmachtführungsstabes (Chief of Operation Staff) im OKW (Note: According to Scherzer on 6 May 1945 as Chef des Wehrmachtführungsstabes (Chief of Operation Staff) im OKW and deputy chief of the OKW.)	7 May 1945	Awarded (865th) Oak Leaves 7 May 1945? (Note: The award was unlawfully presented on 10 May 1945. The sequential number "865" was assigned by the Association of Knight's Cross Recipients (AKCR).)	
Ferdinand Jodl	Heer	General der Gebirgstruppe	Commanding general of the XIX. Gebirgskorps	13 January 1945	—	
Martin Joecks	Heer	Hauptmann of the Reserves	Commander of leichte Artillerie-Abteilung 426 (motorized) (Note: According to Scherzer as commander of leichte Artillerie-Abteilung (Raupenschlepper Ost) 426.)	14 May 1944	—	—
Wolf-Joachim Jödicke	Luftwaffe	Major	Gruppenkommandeur of the I./Kampfgeschwader 3 "Lützow"	5 February 1944	—	—
Wolfgang Joerchel	Waffen-SS	SS-Obersturmbannführer	Commander of niederländ. SS-Freiwilligen-Panzergrenadier-Regiment 48 "General Seyffardt" (Note: According to Scherzer as commander of SS-Freiwilligen-Panzergrenadier-Regiment 48 "General Seyffardt" (niederländische Nr. 1).)	21 April 1944	—	—
Karl Jörß	Kriegsmarine	Bootsmannsmaat of the Reserves (Note: According to Scherzer as Bootsmannsmaat (Petty Officer) and Flakleiter auf dem Transporter "Dora" (anti aircraft controller on the transporter "Doroa").)	Flakleiter auf einem Transporter im Mittelmeer (anti aircraft controller on a transporter in the Mediterranean)	17 February 1943	—	
Gerhard Jözwiak	Heer	Unteroffizier	Zugführer (platoon leader) in the 12./Panzergrenadier-Regiment 104	17 March 1945	—	—
Bernhard Johannes	Luftwaffe	Feldwebel	Pilot in the 1./Schlachtgeschwader 10 (Note: According to Scherzer as pilot in the I./Schlachtgeschwader 10.)	29 October 1944*	Killed in action 11 July 1944	—
Rolf Johannesson	Kriegsmarine	Kapitän zur See	Commander of destroyer Hermes	7 December 1942	—	—
Willy Johannmeyer+	Heer	Oberleutnant	Leader of the II./Infanterie-Regiment 503	16 May 1942	Awarded 329th Oak Leaves 18 November 1943	—
Günther Johanns	Heer	Major (Note: According to Scherzer as Major zur Verwendung (for disposition).)	Commander of Pionier-Bataillon 292	9 January 1944	—	—
Hans Johannsen	Kriegsmarine	Oberleutnant (Ing.)	Chief engineer on U-802	31 March 1945	—	—
Kurt Johannsen	Kriegsmarine	Kapitänleutnant	Chief of the 5. Schnellbootflottille	14 June 1944	—	—
Karl-Ludwig Johanssen	Luftwaffe	Leutnant	Radio operator in the I./Nachtjagdgeschwader 6 (Note: According to Scherzer as radio operator in the IV./Nachtjagdgeschwader 6.)	20 March 1945	—	—
Dipl.-Ing. Richard John	Heer	Generalmajor	Commander of the 292. Infanterie-Division	20 December 1943	—	
Richard John	Heer	Feldwebel	Company troop leader in the 2./Grenadier-Regiment 445	4 May 1944	—	—
Wolfram John	Heer	Oberleutnant of the Reserves	Chief of the 2./Sturmgeschütz-Brigade 209	18 November 1944	—	—
Max Johne	Heer	Oberleutnant of the Reserves	Chief of the 9./Grenadier-Regiment 667	30 October 1943	—	—
Wilhelm Johnen	Luftwaffe	Oberleutnant	Staffelkapitän of the 8./Nachtjagdgeschwader 6 (Note: According to Scherzer as pilot in the 8./Nachtjagdgeschwader 6.)	29 October 1944	—	—
Fritz Jokisch	Heer	Feldwebel of the Reserves (Note: According to Scherzer as Feldwebel.)	Zugführer (platoon leader) in the 3./Panzergrenadier-Regiment 110	28 July 1943*	Died of wounds 14 July 1943	—
Günter Jolitz	Luftwaffe	Oberleutnant	Staffelführer of the 9.(K)/Lehrgeschwader 1	5 June 1944* (Note: According to Scherzer on 9 June 1944.)	Killed in action 12 February 1944	—
Erwin Jollasse	Heer	Oberst	Commander of Schützen-Regiment 52	2 November 1941	—	—
Ludwig Jooss	Heer	Major of the Reserves	Commander of I./Grenadier-Regiment 21	17 March 1945	—	—
Bernhard Jope+	Luftwaffe	Oberleutnant	Pilot in the 2./Kampfgeschwader 40	30 December 1940	Awarded 431st Oak Leaves 24 March 1944	
Hermann-Friedrich Joppien+	Luftwaffe	Oberleutnant	Staffelkapitän of the 1./Jagdgeschwader 51 (Note: According to Scherzer as pilot in the I./Jagdgeschwader 51.)	16 September 1940	Awarded 11th Oak Leaves 23 April 1941	
Adolf Jordan	Heer	Major	Commander of the I./Infanterie-Regiment 203	27 May 1942	—	—
Günther Jordan	Heer	Oberst of the Reserves	Commander of Jäger-Regiment 25 (L) (Note: According to Scherzer as commander of Jäger-Regiment 23 (L).)	17 March 1945	—	—
Hans Jordan+	Heer	Oberst	Commander of Infanterie-Regiment 49	5 June 1940	Awarded 59th Oak Leaves 16 January 1942; 64th Swords 20 April 1944	—
Hans Jordan	Heer	Oberstleutnant im Generalstab (in the General Staff)	Ia (operations officer) in the 72. Infanterie-Division	22 February 1945	—	—
Herbert Jordan	Heer	Hauptmann	Chief of the 4./Artillerie-Regiment 32	10 September 1944	—	—
Hermann Jordan	Heer	Hauptmann	Leader of the III./Grenadier-Regiment 9	16 August 1943*	Killed in action 2 August 1943	—
Manfred Jordan	Heer	Sanitäts-Unteroffizier	Zugführer (platoon leader) in the 4./Panzergrenadier-Regiment 66	11 January 1944	—	—
Walter Joseph	Heer	Leutnant of the Reserves	Leader of the 4./Feldersatz-Bataillon 107	24 June 1944	—	—
Hans Jost	Heer	Feldwebel	Zugführer (platoon leader) in the 2./Panzer-Jäger-Abteilung 256	5 April 1944*	Killed in action 23 February 1944	—
Walter Jost	Heer	Oberst	Commander of Infanterie-Regiment 75	31 March 1942	—	—
Günther Josten+	Luftwaffe	Oberfeldwebel	Pilot in the 3./Jagdgeschwader 51 "Mölders" (Note: According to Scherzer as pilot in the 1./Jagdgeschwader 51 "Mölders".)	5 February 1944	Awarded 810th Oak Leaves 28 March 1945	—
Wilhelm Joswig	Luftwaffe	Oberfeldwebel	Pilot in the 9./Sturzkampfgeschwader 2 "Immelmann"	29 February 1944	—	—
Hans Juchem	Waffen-SS	SS-Hauptsturmführer	Commander of the II./Panzergrenadier-Regiment "Germania"	12 September 1943*	Killed in action 13 August 1943	—
Georg Juditzki	Luftwaffe	Leutnant	Pilot in the Stab I./Kampfgeschwader 53 "Legion Condor"	9 November 1944	—	—
Walter Jünemann	Heer	Feldwebel	Company troop leader in the 4./Panzergrenadier-Regiment 104	4 October 1944*	Killed in action 14 August 1944	—
Friedrich-Wilhelm Jürgen	Heer	Major	Commander of the II./Schützen-Regiment 2	16 June 1940	—	—
Heinz Jürgens? (Note: Heinz Jürgens' nomination by the troop was received by the Heerespersonalamt (HPA—Army Staff Office) sometime between 23 and 27 April 1945 and prepared for signature with a presentation date of 28 April 1945. However it was never signed. According to the Association of Knight's Cross Recipients (AKCR) the award was present in accordance with the Dönitz-decree. This is illegal according to the Deutsche Dienststelle (WASt) and lacks legal justification. Jürgens was a member of the AKCR.)	Waffen-SS	SS-Hauptsturmführer	Commander of SS-Panzer-Aufklärungs-Abteilung 4	9 May 1945	—	—
Karl Jürgens	Heer	Feldwebel	Zugführer (platoon leader) in the 2./Infanterie-Regiment 73	4 September 1940	—	—
Wilhelm Jürgens	Luftwaffe	Major	Commander of the II./Flak-Regiment 23 (motorized)	9 June 1944	—	—
Arnold Jürgensen	Waffen-SS	SS-Sturmbannführer	Commander of the I./SS-Panzer-Regiment 12 "Hitlerjugend"	16 October 1944	—	—
Justus Jürgensen	Heer	Bau-Pionier	In the 5./Pionier-Bau-Ersatz und Ausbildungs Bataillon 3 Crossen (Oder) (Note: According to Scherzer in the 5./Pionier-Bau-Ersatz und Ausbildungs Bataillon 3 (391. Sicherungs-Division).)	5 February 1945*	Killed in action 5 February 1945	—
Klaus Jürgensen	Heer	Hauptmann	Leader of the I./Grenadier-Regiment 46	2 February 1944	—	—
Arthur Jüttner+	Heer	Hauptmann	Commander of the III./Infanterie-Regiment 38	14 December 1941	Awarded 622nd Oak Leaves 18 October 1944; 141st Swords 5 April 1945	—
Werner Junck	Luftwaffe	Generalmajor	Commanding general of the II. Jagdkorps	9 June 1944	—	—
Heinrich Jung	Luftwaffe	Hauptmann	Gruppenkommandeur of the II./Jagdgeschwader 54	12 November 1943*	Killed in action 30 July 1943	—
Valentin Jung	Heer	Hauptmann	Commander of Feldersatz-Bataillon 92 and Divisions-Kampfschule (Note: According to Scherzer as commander of Feldersatz-Bataillon 92.)	28 December 1943	—	—
Dietrich ter Jung	Heer	Oberleutnant of the Reserves	Leader of the II./Panzergrenadier-Regiment 79	4 May 1944	—	—
Heinz Jungclausen	Luftwaffe	Oberleutnant	Staffelkapitän of the 6./Sturzkampfgeschwader 2 "Immelmann"	9 October 1943	—	—
Herbert Junge	Heer	Unteroffizier	Commander of a 8.8-cm FlaK in Greifenhagen (Note: According to Scherzer as gun leader in the 4./schwere Flak-Abteilung 326.)	13 March 1945	—	—
Wilhelm Junge	Heer	Oberleutnant of the Reserves	Chief of the 5./Artillerie-Regiment 1542	9 December 1944	—	—
Siegfried Jungklaus	Luftwaffe	Hauptmann	Gruppenkommandeur of the III.(Eis)/Kampfgeschwader 3 "Lützow"	3 September 1943*	Killed in action 22 April 1943	—
Johann Jungkunst	Heer	Feldwebel	Zugführer (platoon leader) in the 11./Infanterie-Regiment 41 (motorized)	30 August 1941	—	—
Edgar Jungnickel	Kriegsmarine	Oberleutnant zur See	Commander of U-Jäger 1430	10 September 1944	—	—
Hans Jungwirth? (Note: Hans Jungwirth's nomination (copy of the original nomination), together with Richard Hengstler's and Ferdinand Deutsch's nomination, was received by the Heerespersonalamt (HPA—Army Staff Office) from the troop on 26 March 1945. Major Joachim Domaschk forwarded this nomination to the Luftwaffenpersonalamt (LPA—Airforce Staff Office). All three original nominations had already been received by the LPA at this time. The LPA had created LPA-nominations which had been forwarded to Reichsmarschall Hermann Göring on 24 April. Göring never received these nominations since he was already arrested at that time. Göring had been under arrest by the SS on the Obersalzberg since 23 April. General Rudolf Meister therefore took the decision himself and awarded Deutsch the Knight's Cross while he rejected Hengstler's nomination. Jungwirth's nomination was retained by the LPA. The reason for this remains unanswered since Jungwirth's file in the German Federal Archives was looted. A presentation cannot be proven. According to the Association of Knight's Cross Recipients (AKCR) the award was presented in accordance with the Dönitz-decree. This is illegal according to the Deutsche Dienststelle (WASt) and lacks legal justification. The presentation date was assigned by Fellgiebel.)	Luftwaffe	Major	Commander of Fallschirm-Aufklärungs-Abteilung 12	9 May 1945	—	—
Heinz Junker	Heer	Leutnant	Zugführer (platoon leader) in the Sturmgeschütz-Abteilung 1026	14 January 1945	—	—
Georg Jura	Heer	Stabsfeldwebel	Leader of the 14./Jäger-Regiment 49	28 April 1943	—	—
Franz Jursa	Heer	Unteroffizier	Zugführer (platoon leader) in the 3./Grenadier-Regiment 482	2 August 1943	—	—
Franz Juschkat	Heer	Feldwebel	Zugführer (platoon leader) in the Stabskompanie/Grenadier-Regiment 43	17 February 1943	—	
