= The Oceanides =

Tone poem by Jean Sibelius

- Tone poem by Jean Sibelius
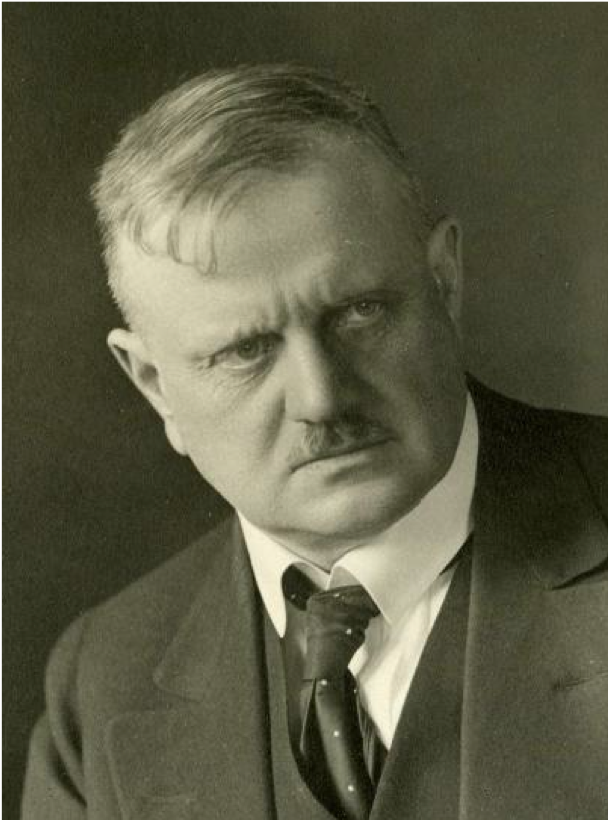
- The composer (c. 1915)
- Native name: Aallottaret
- Opus: 73
- Composed: 1913–1914, rev. 1914
- Publisher: Breitkopf & Härtel (1915)

Premiere
- Date: 4 June 1914
- Location: Norfolk, Connecticut, US
- Conductor: Jean Sibelius
- Performers: Orchestra of the Music Festival

The Oceanides (in Finnish: Aallottaret), (Note: The literal English translation of the Finnish: Aallottaret is Nymphs of the Waves or Spirits of the Waves; the original working title of the piece was: Rondeau der Wellen; in English: Rondo of the Waves) Op. 73, is a single-movement tone poem for orchestra written from 1913 to 1914 by the Finnish composer Jean Sibelius. The piece, which refers to the nymphs in Greek mythology who inhabited the Mediterranean Sea, premiered on 4 June 1914 at the Norfolk Music Festival in Connecticut with Sibelius conducting. Praised upon its premiere as "the finest evocation of the sea ... ever ... produced in music", the tone poem, in D major, consists of two subjects, said to represent the playful activity of the nymphs and the majesty of the ocean, respectively. Sibelius gradually develops this material over three informal stages: first, a placid ocean; second, a gathering storm; and third, a thunderous wave-crash climax. As the tempest subsides, a final chord sounds, symbolizing the mighty power and limitless expanse of the sea.

Stylistically, many commentators have described The Oceanides as an example of Impressionism. Others have countered that Sibelius's active development of the two subjects, his sparing use of scales favored by Impressionists, and his prioritization of action and structure over ephemeral, atmospheric background distinguish the piece from quintessential examples, such as Debussy's La mer.

Aside from the definitive D major tone poem, two intermediate versions of The Oceanides survive: the first, a three-movement orchestral suite, in E♭ major, that dates to 1913 (movement No. 1 lost); and the second, the initial single-movement "Yale" version of the tone poem, in D♭ major, which Sibelius dispatched to America in advance of his journey but revised prior to the music festival. The Oceanides thus stands alongside En saga, the Lemminkäinen Suite, the Violin Concerto, and the Fifth Symphony as one of Sibelius's most overhauled works. The suite and Yale version, never performed in the composer's lifetime, received their world premieres by Osmo Vänskä and the Lahti Symphony Orchestra on 10 September and 24 October 2002, respectively. A typical performance of the final version lasts about 10 minutes, some 3 minutes longer than its Yale predecessor.

== History ==
=== Composition ===
In August 1913, Sibelius received a message from the American composer and Yale University professor Horatio Parker: a New England patron of the arts, Carl Stoeckel, and his wife, Ellen Stoeckel née Battell, had authorized $1,000 for the commission of a new symphonic poem from Sibelius, per Parker's recommendation. (Note: Parker was acquainted with Sibelius's work; earlier in the year, he had hired Sibelius to compose Three Songs for American Schools, JS 199 (No. 1: Autumn Song, for soprano, alto, and piano; No. 2: The Sun upon the Lake is Low, for mixed choir a cappella; and, No. 3: A Cavalry Catch, for unison male voices and piano).) The piece, not to exceed fifteen minutes in length, was to be played at the 1914 Norfolk Music Festival in Connecticut, which the Stoeckels annually hosted (and financed) at their estate in a wooden performance hall dubbed "The Music Shed". Despite his ongoing struggles with another commission, incidental music to Poul Knudsen's tragic ballet-pantomime Scaramouche, Sibelius accepted the Stoeckel offer, writing in his diary, "A symphonic poem, ready by April".

==== Initial and intermediate versions ====
In early September, another letter from Parker arrived saying that Stockel wished to provide the copyist's fee for writing out the orchestral parts in Finland. As 1913 drew to a close, Sibelius had not made much progress on the American commission, having spent the entire autumn on other pieces and revisions. A trip to Berlin in January 1914 followed, and Sibelius's diary and correspondence indicate the Stoeckel commission was at the forefront of his mind; an initial plan to set Rydberg's poem Fantasos and Sulamit subsequently was discarded. His stay in Berlin was not productive, and in mid-February he returned to Helsinki ("Uneasy because of the America thing [Norfolk commission]. Presumably have to go home to my cell in order to be able to concentrate".)

Today, three versions of the work survive. Initially in 1913, Sibelius conceived of the commission as a three-movement suite for orchestra in E♭ major, of which only No. 2 (Tempo moderato) and No. 3 (Allegro) are extant. (Note: At a later date, Sibelius annotated "Fragments from a Suite for Orchestra 1914/Predecessor of The Oceanides" in pencil on the suite's title page.) At some point in 1913–14, Sibelius decided to rework the thematic material of the Allegro, very much a "work in progress", into a single-movement symphonic poem; the musical content of the Tempo moderato would find its way into the piano piece Till trånaden (To Longing), JS 202. In making the transition from suite to tone poem, Sibelius transposed the material from E♭ to D♭ major; in addition, he also introduced new musical ideas, such as the rocking wave-like motif in the strings and woodwinds, and expanded the orchestration.

==== Final version ====
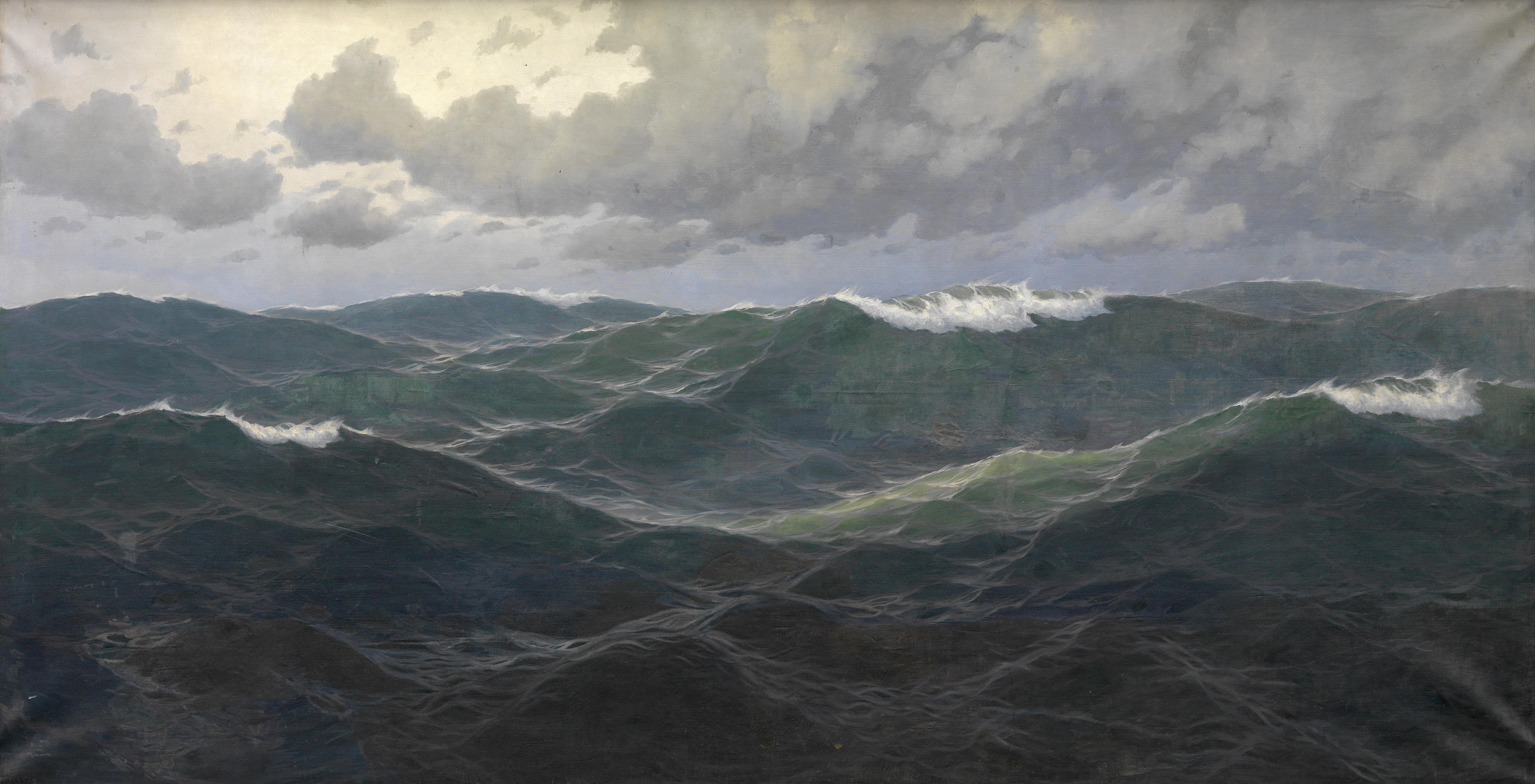
Großes Marinestück by Max Jensen (c. 1880), which depicts a stormy sea reminiscent of the one Sibelius creates musically in The Oceanides

In April 1914, Sibelius mailed the score and parts to the United States, calling the piece Rondeau der Wellen (this intermediate version of the tone poem is commonly referred to as the "Yale" version). (Note: Upon his departure from America in June, Sibelius left this version of the tone poem with Stoeckel, as a token of his gratitude for his host's generosity; upon Stoeckel's death, the manuscript eventually was deposited at Yale University.) On 12 and 20 April 1914, Parker wrote on behalf of Stoeckel, expanding upon the initial agreement: Sibelius's American patron now wished him to travel to and conduct a program of his music at the Norfolk festival; as compensation, Sibelius would receive $1,200, as well as an honorary doctorate of music from Yale University. Although he already had sent the manuscript to Norfolk, Sibelius was not satisfied with the score and immediately began to revise the piece, eventually opting for a complete overhaul ("Isn't it just like me to rework the tone poem—at the moment I am ablaze with it."). Although Sibelius was prone to revising his compositions, such effort was usually undertaken when preparing a piece for publication or after having heard it first performed in concert. With respect to the Yale version, it is possible the invitation to attend the music festival in person prompted Sibelius to "reassess" the tone poem with a more critical eye.

The differences between the first and final versions of the tone poem are substantial; not only did Sibelius again transpose the piece, into D major, but he also added the wave-crash climax. Despite these changes, the orchestration is more or less the same, with the addition of one trumpet. As the trip to America approached, Sibelius raced to complete the revisions in time. Aino Sibelius, the composer's wife, recounts the scenes at Ainola:

The trip to America is approaching. Rondeau der Wellen is not yet complete. Terrible haste ... the score is only half-ready. The copyist, Mr. Kauppi, is staying with us and writing night and day ... It is only because of Janne's [Sibelius] energy that we are making progress ... We lit a lamp in the dining room, a chandelier in the living room, it was a festive moment. I didn't dare say a word. I just checked that the environment was in order. Then I went to bed and Janne stayed up. All night long I could hear his footsteps, alternating with music played quietly.

Sibelius continued to make changes to the final version of the tone poem as he sailed across the Atlantic Ocean aboard the steamship SS Kaiser Wilhelm II and even during rehearsals in Norfolk, but these last-minute changes, Andrew Barnett argues, must have been relatively "minor", as the orchestral parts had been copied before his departure from Finland. Sibelius was delighted with the new piece, writing to Aino, "It's as though I have found myself, and more besides. The Fourth Symphony was the start. But in this piece there is so much more. There are passages in it that drive me crazy. Such poetry". Neither the suite nor the Yale version of the tone poem was performed in Sibelius's lifetime, receiving their world premieres by Osmo Vänskä and the Lahti Symphony Orchestra on 19 September and 24 October 2002, respectively.

==== Naming the piece ====
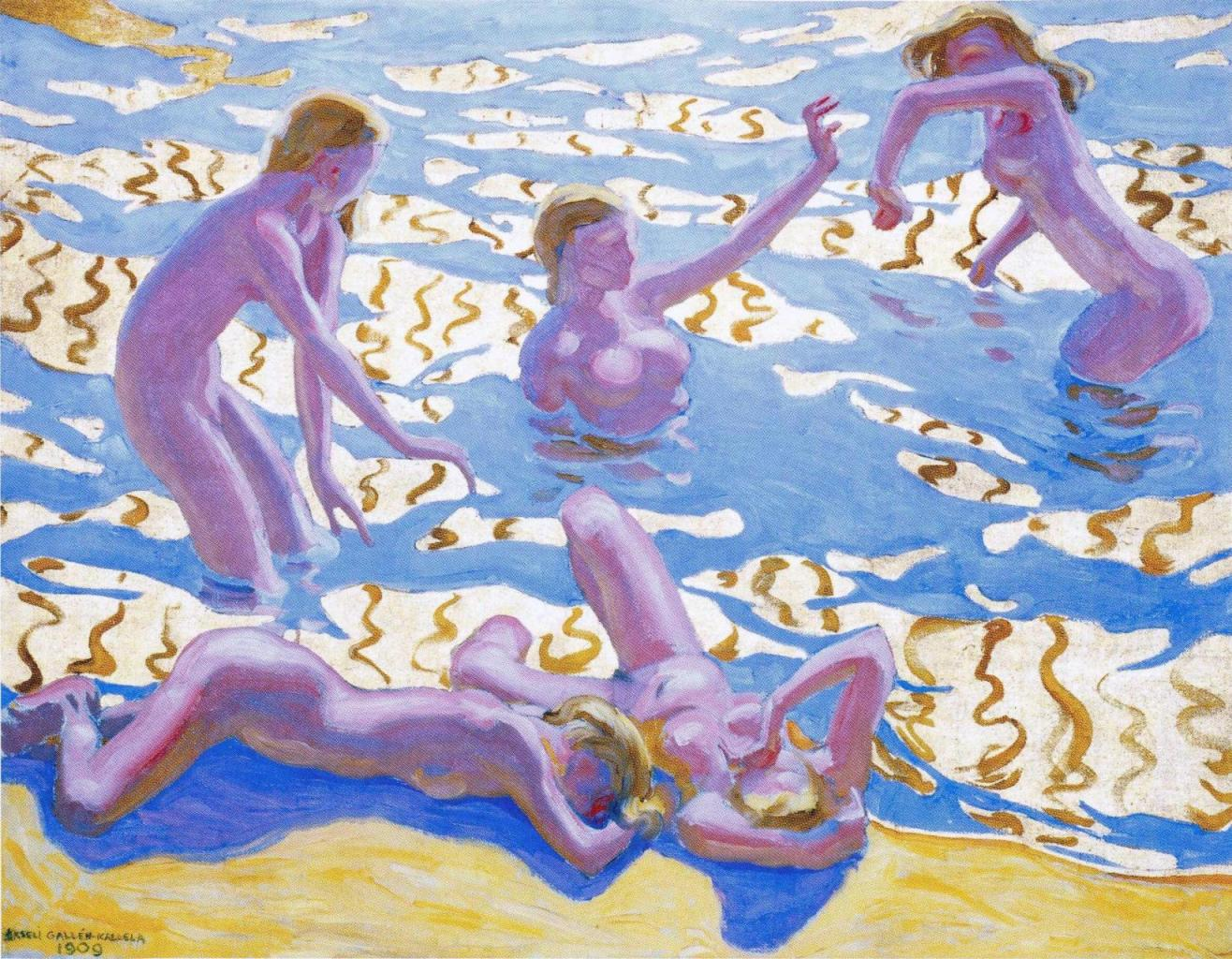
Aallottaret (c. 1909), by Finnish painter Akseli Gallen-Kallela, the composer's friend

Sibelius appears to have vacillated over a name for the new tone poem. By 3 April 1914 he had dropped Rondeau der Wellen in favor of Aallottaret. (Note: Aallottaret is usually translated to English variously as Nymphs of the Waves or Spirits of the Waves; Sibelius appears to have borrowed the term from the Finnish national epic, the Kalevala, root word aallotar, or 'wave-goddess'.) On 29 April he wrote to Parker in favor of the original title ("Herr Doctor, now you must forgive me for performing the new tone poem in its final version with the original title Rondeau der Wellen. The version Aallottaret that I sent to you can stay with Mr. Stoeckel".). This position, too, proved fleeting. By the end of May, Sibelius had settled on Aallottaret, and the tone poem appeared under this title, albeit misspelled, on the 4 June Norfolk Festival program: "Aalottaret [sic]—Tone Poem (Nymphs of the Ocean)". In preparation for the publication of the tone poem by Breitkopf & Härtel in June 1915, Sibelius included alongside the Finnish title, Aallottaret, an "explanatory" German translation, Die Okeaniden (in English: The Oceanides). The piece was published as Op. 73 and dedicated to Mr. and Mrs. Carl Stoeckel.

=== Performances ===
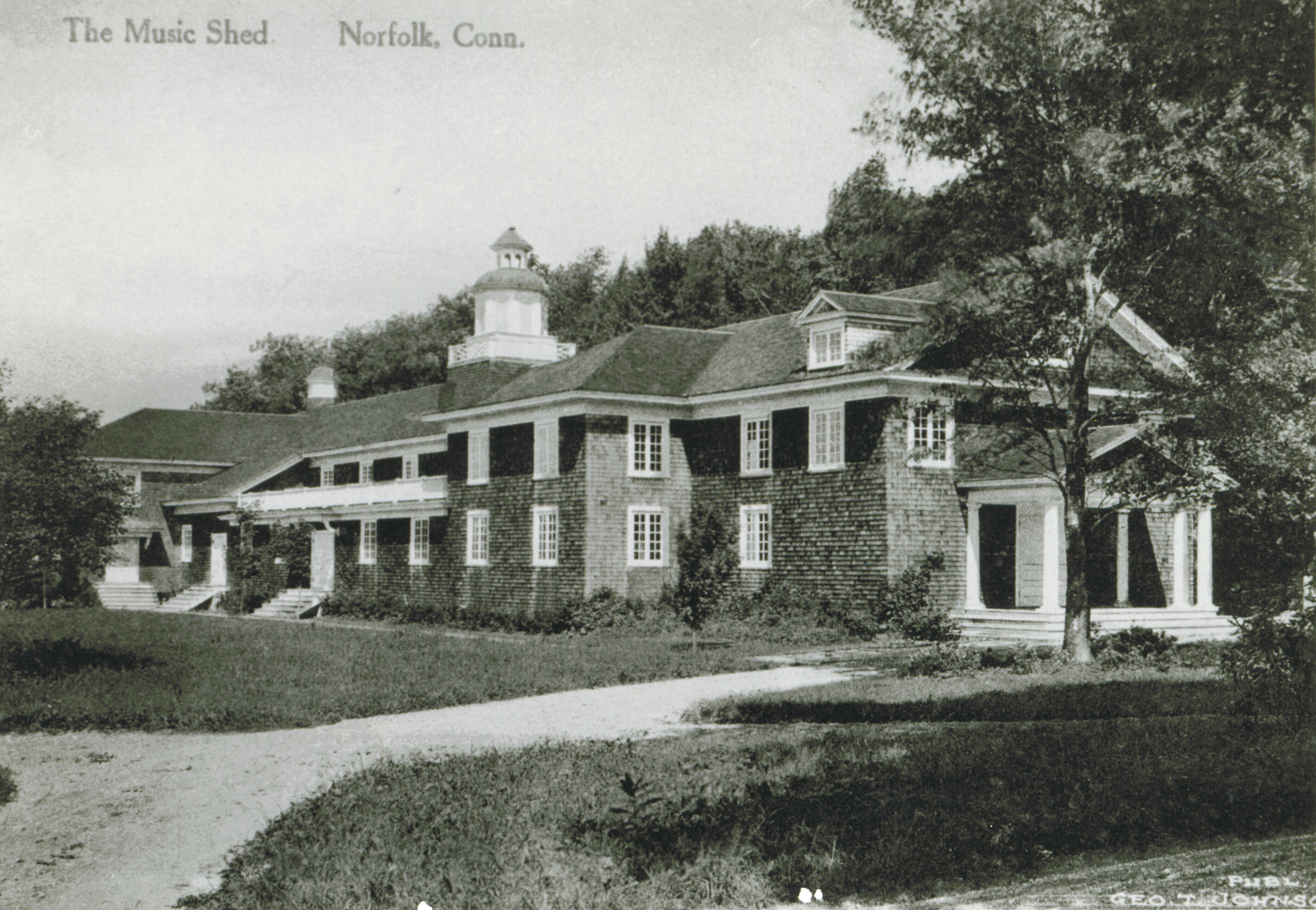
Postcard of the Music Shed (c. 1920s), the venue at which Sibelius premiered The Oceanides in 1914

==== American premiere ====
The tone poem premiered on 4 June 1914 at "The Shed" concert hall of the Norfolk Music Festival, Sibelius himself conducting at a podium decorated in the American and Finnish national colors. The orchestra, which Sibelius praised as "wonderful ... surpasses anything we have in Europe", comprised musicians drawn from three of America's best music societies: the New York Philharmonic, the Metropolitan Opera Orchestra, and the Boston Symphony Orchestra. The Oceanides was unlike anything the musicians had previously encountered. "I think they did not understand it all at first from what they said", Stoeckel recalled. "The next morning, after having run it through three times, they were thoroughly delighted with it and remarked that the beauty of the music grew with each rehearsal". The festival public sounded a similarly positive note about the new piece, which concluded a concert of Sibelius's music that included Pohjola's Daughter, the King Christian II Suite, The Swan of Tuonela, Finlandia, and Valse triste. Stoeckel recounts the events of 4 June:

Everyone who was fortunate enough to be in the audience agreed that it was the musical event of their lives, and after the performance of the last number there was an ovation to the composer which I have never seen equalled anywhere, the entire audience rose to their feet and shouted with enthusiasm, and probably the calmest man in the whole hall was the composer himself; he bowed repeatedly with that distinction of manner which was so typical of him ... As calm as Sibelius had appeared on the stage, after his part was over he came up stairs and sank into a chair in one of the dressing rooms and was very much overcome. Some people declared that he wept. Personally I do not think that he did, but there were tears in his eyes as he shook our hands and thanked us for what he was pleased to call the "honor we had done him".

Upon conclusion of the second half of the program (which featured Dvořák's Ninth Symphony, Coleridge-Taylor's rhapsody From the Prairie, and the overture to Wagner's opera Die Feen), the orchestra performed the Finnish national anthem, Vårt Land. (Note: Sibelius was "deeply moved" by the orchestra's playing of the Finnish national anthem, telling Stoeckel, "Finland thanks you and your wife. I regard the singing of this anthem as an honor not to me but to my native land".) (Note: The remainder of Sibelius's American visit included a trip to New York City (where he met ex-U.S. President William Howard Taft), an excursion to Niagara Falls, the Yale University Encaenia, and a banquet in his honor, which was attended by some of America's leading composers, among them Henry Hadley, George Chadwick, Frederick Converse, and Charles Loeffler.)

==== European premiere ====
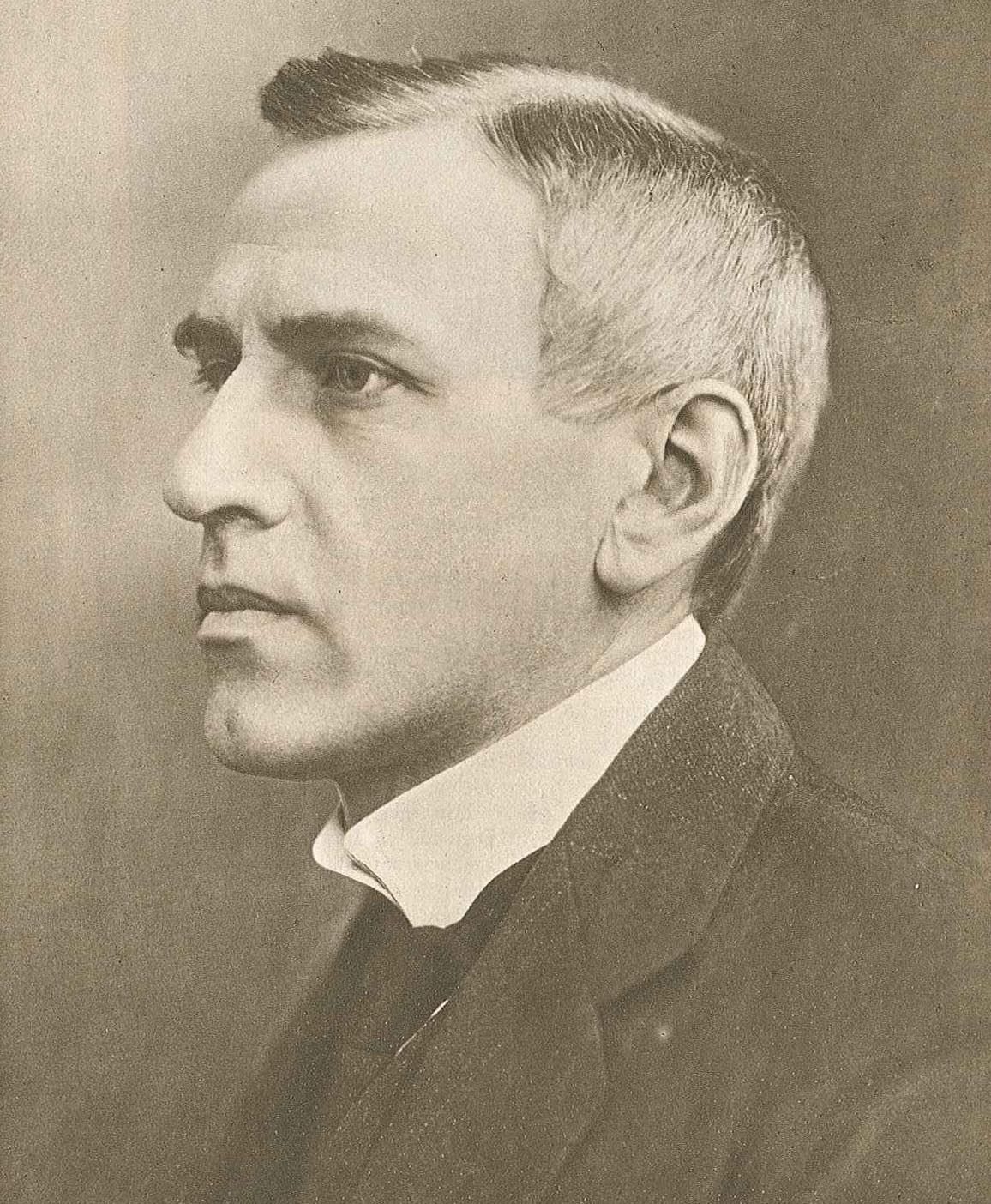
Swedish composer, Wilhelm Stenhammar (c. 1916), a friend of Sibelius's who was key in securing the European premiere of The Oceanides for Gothenburg

With the outbreak of World War I on 28 July 1914, The Oceanides languished. Wartime politics being what they were, Sibelius's music was seldom played outside the Nordic countries and the United States: in Germany, there was little demand for the music of an "enemy national", (Note: As a duchy of Russia, Finland was officially aligned against Germany, although Sibelius personally looked favorably upon Germany and Austria, having known them as a student in the 1890s.) while in Russia, Finns were viewed as being "less than loyal subjects of the Tsar". In any case, many of Sibelius's works had been printed by German publishing houses, a detail that harmed Sibelius's reputation not only in Russia, but also Britain and the United States. According to Tawaststjerna, the war plunged Sibelius into a state of melancholy and creative struggle (the Fifth and Sixth symphonies were in the process of simultaneous gestation at this time). His response was to retreat into near solitude: he abstained from attending and giving concerts and neglected his circle of friends, and he imagined himself "forgotten and ignored, a lonely beacon of light in a deepening winter darkness".

Sibelius was not easily stirred from his exile; friend and fellow composer Wilhelm Stenhammar, then Artistic Director and chief conductor of the Gothenburg Symphony Orchestra, wrote to Sibelius repeatedly to persuade him to conduct a concert of his works in Gothenburg. Believing himself duty-bound to premiere a "major work" in Sweden, such as a symphony, Sibelius—to Stenhammar's chagrin—delayed each scheduled trip. He withdrew from planned concerts for March 1914, writing to Stenhammar, "My conscience forces me to this. But when I have some new works ready next year, as I hope, it would give me great joy to perform them in Gothenburg". New arrangements were made for February 1915, but these, too, Sibelius canceled in December 1914. In the end, the indefatigable Stenhammar prevailed and new concerts were set for March 1915 ("I see yet again your great sympathy for my music. I shall come".).

Stenhammar's efforts were rewarded with the European premiere of The Oceanides. For Sibelius, it was an opportunity to once again be an "artist on tour", feeding off the energy and "rapturous ovations" of an audience (it had been nine months since the Norfolk concerts, which now seemed a distant memory). The first concert, on March 22, featured the Second Symphony, Scènes historiques II, and two movements from Swanwhite before concluding with The Oceanides. According to Sibelius's diary, the performance was a "great success", with Stenhammar "captivated" particularly by the final number. The 24 March program retained The Oceanides, but paired it with Scènes historiques I, the Nocturne from the King Christian II Suite, a movement from Rakastava, Lemminkäinen's Return, and the Fourth Symphony. Sibelius was very pleased with the orchestra's handling of The Oceanides, calling its performance "wonderful". He goes on to note in his diary that, "After the final number [The Oceanides] there was a deafening torrent of applause, stamps, cries of bravo, a standing ovation and fanfares from the orchestra".

==== Other notable performances ====
The Finnish premiere of The Oceanides occurred on the occasion of Sibelius's fiftieth birthday celebration on 8 December 1915 at the Great Hall of the University of Helsinki, (Note: The original venue, the Finnish National Theatre, was abandoned as a result of concerns over acoustics.) with Sibelius conducting the Helsinki Philharmonic Orchestra. The program, which The Oceanides opened, also included the two Serenades for violin and orchestra (Op. 69, Richard Burgin was the soloist) and, most importantly, the world premiere of the Fifth Symphony, at that time still in four movements. The birthday program was well received, and Sibelius twice repeated it, once at the Finnish National Theatre on 12 December and then again at the University of Helsinki on 18 December. The celebrations continued into the new year, with Sibelius conducting The Oceanides at a concert in Finland's Folketshus on 9 January 1916. The tone poem was also taken up in the spring by Sibelius's brother-in-law, Armas Järnefelt, who led the Stockholm Opera Orchestra. Robert Kajanus later followed with a performance of The Oceanides in February 1917.

== Instrumentation ==
The revised version of The Oceanides is scored for the following instruments, organized by family (woodwinds, brass, percussion, and strings):

- 1 piccolo, 2 flutes, 2 oboes, cor anglais, 2 clarinets (in B♭), 1 bass clarinet (in B♭), 2 bassoons, and contrabassoon
- 4 horns (in F), 3 trumpets (in B♭), and 3 trombones
- Timpani (2 players), triangle, and glockenspiel ("stahlstäbe")
- Violins (I & II), violas, cellos, double basses, and 2 harps

The original version of the piece called for one fewer trumpet.

== Structure ==
The Oceanides is a single-movement tone poem that consists of two main subjects, A and B. The "lively" A section (in duple meter), first introduced by the flutes at the beginning of the piece, can be said to represent the playful activity of the nymphs:

Shortly after, solo oboe and clarinet—supported by harp glissandi and strings—introduce the "majestic" B section (in triple meter), which brings to mind the ocean's depth and expansiveness and perhaps, at least according to Tawaststjerna, "the God of the Sea himself":

Sibelius gradually expands and deepens the two subjects, building up to an enormous (almost onomatopoeic) wave-crash climax that Daniel Grimley has characterized as a "point of textural, dynamic and chromatic saturation". Formally stated by Tawaststjerna, the tone poem structurally proceeds as follows:

- A (D major)
- B (modulating, ending in the area of D minor–F major)
- A_{1} (F major; A returns, but "the winds begin to gather force")
- B_{1} (ending in E♭ major–G♭ major; B returns and "brings the storm nearer")
- C (modulating and ending on the pedal A, which becomes the dominant of D major; serves as development by utilizing material from both A and B; "the oceanides are swamped" by the storm and the swell of the sea's waves)
- A_{2} (intermediate D major; the storm ends and the theme of the oceanides returns)
- Coda (final chord demonstrates "the immutability and vastness of the ocean waters into which the oceanides themselves do not venture")

Grimley interprets the piece as progressing through "a series of three generative, wave-like cycles", perhaps best described as placid ocean (A–B), gathering storm (A_{1}–B_{1}), and wave-crash climax (C–A). David Hurwitz views the structure of the piece similarly to Tawaststjerna, albeit as A–B–A–B–Coda(B–A), which he terms "sonata form without development", while Robert Layton considers The Oceanides "something ... of a free rondo", due to the continued reappearance of the opening flute theme (A).

== Reception ==
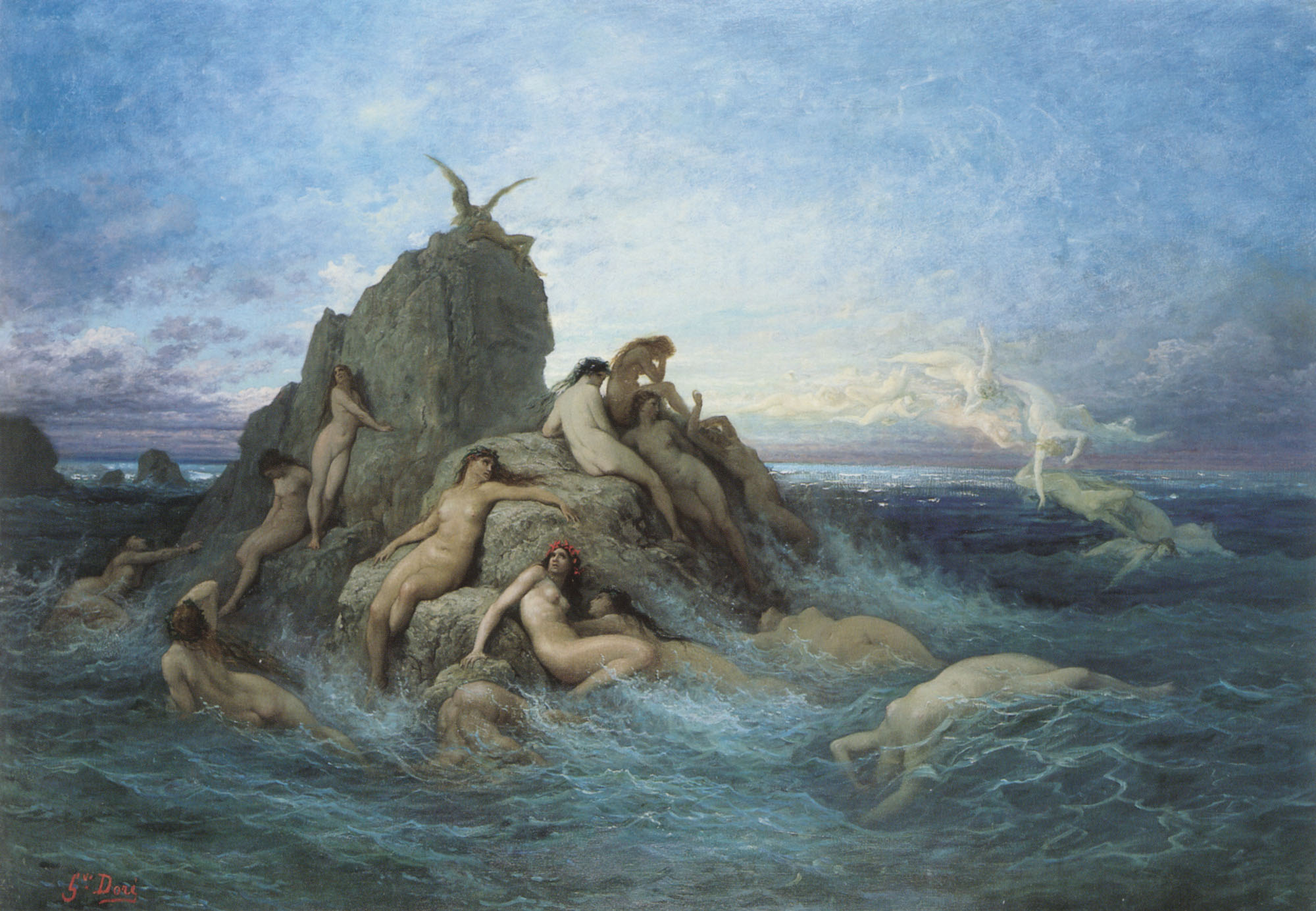
The Oceanids (The Naiads of the Sea) (c. 1860), by Gustave Doré, which depicts the nymphs who inhabited the waters of Greek mythology

Critical opinion as to the merit of The Oceanides has been overwhelmingly positive, and today the piece is counted among Sibelius's masterpieces. Following the 1914 premiere, Olin Downes, the American music critic and Sibelius devotee, described the new work as "the finest evocation of the sea which has ever been produced in music", praising the composer for his "extraordinarily developed feeling for form, proportion and continuity". Downes furthermore assessed Sibelius's Norfolk concert as just the third time since 1900 that he had "felt himself in the presence of a genius of world class" (the other two being Richard Strauss in 1904 and Arturo Toscanini in 1910). An unsigned review in the New-York Tribune (almost certainly penned by critic Henry Krehbiel) found the new work "fresh and vital, full of imagination and strong in climax". He continues:

Extremists will probably deplore the fact that the composer is still a respecter of form, still a devotee of beauty, still a believer in the potency of melody; but this is rather a matter for congratulation than regret ... Mr. Sibelius is a fine musical constructionist, an eloquent harmonist and a fine colorist despite his fondness for dark tints.

The influential Swedish critic Wilhelm Peterson-Berger, always a thorn in Sibelius's side and whom the composer had once mocked as "his lordship", (Note: Over the years, Peterson-Berger had savaged the Fourth Symphony, the Violin Concerto, Pelléas et Mélisande, The Dryad, and Nightride and Sunrise but had praised the Second Symphony and Pohjola's Daughter.) required some three encounters with The Oceanides before warming to the new symphonic poem: after hearing the Stockholm Concert Society under Sibelius in 1923, Peterson-Berger at last embraced the piece. "The Oceanides was totally and completely different from three years ago under Schnéevoigt", he wrote. "In this beautiful poem one really heard something of the sound of the Aegean Sea and of Homer".

The composer (and former Sibelius pupil) Leevi Madetoja further praised the score upon review, writing in Uusi Suometar in July 1914 that Sibelius, rather than "repeat[ing] endlessly" the style of his previous works, had yet again shown his penchant for "renewing himself musically ... always forward, striving for new aims". The Finnish critic Karl Wasenius (aka BIS), writing in Hufvudstadsbladet after the birthday celebration performances of 1915, wrote approvingly of Sibelius's "refined mastery" of technique. "Not a single note is wasted on brash effects", Wasenius continued. "Yet mighty things are still achieved. Sibelius gives us the expanse and magnitude of the ocean, its powerful wave-song but without boastful gestures. He is too noble for that". In Tidning för musik, Otto Anderssen interpreted Sibelius's latest compositions (among them The Oceanides) as yet another indicator that he was among the most forward-looking modernists: "Sibelius is, I believe, a man of the future ... constantly ahead of his time. Now he stands at the heights where the horizon stretches out over fields which the rest of us cannot yet see". Cecil Gray, moreover, calls the piece "daring" and applauds the score's "exceptional complexity and refinement", challenging critics who see Sibelius as a "primitive artist".

Later commentators also found much to praise in The Oceanides. Guy Rickards describes the tone poem as an "extraordinary score", magnificent yet subtle in its depiction of the sea's various moods, but nonetheless "music suffused by light", while Robert Layton sees the piece as "far more ambitious and highly organized in design" than its immediate predecessor, The Bard. Tawaststjerna notes Sibelius's success at characterizing the sea: the "playful flutes" that bring the oceanides to life but which feel "alien" in the landscape's vastness; the "powerful swell" of wind and water conveyed by oboe and clarinet over undulating strings and harp glissandi; the sustained wind chord symbolizing the "limitless expanse of the sea"; and, the "mighty climax" of the storm, the final wave crash which "always exceeds one's expectations". The Finnish composer Kalevi Aho has argued in favor of the D♭ major Yale version, feeling as though the piece loses "something essential" in terms of orchestral color in D major: "The orchestral tone in D♭ major is veiled, somehow mysterious and impressionistic. Compared with it D major sounds clearer, but also more matter-of-fact". The conductor Osmo Vänskä also has noted the difference between the two keys, comparing the D♭ major version to a "large lake" and the D major to a "mighty ocean".

== Analysis ==
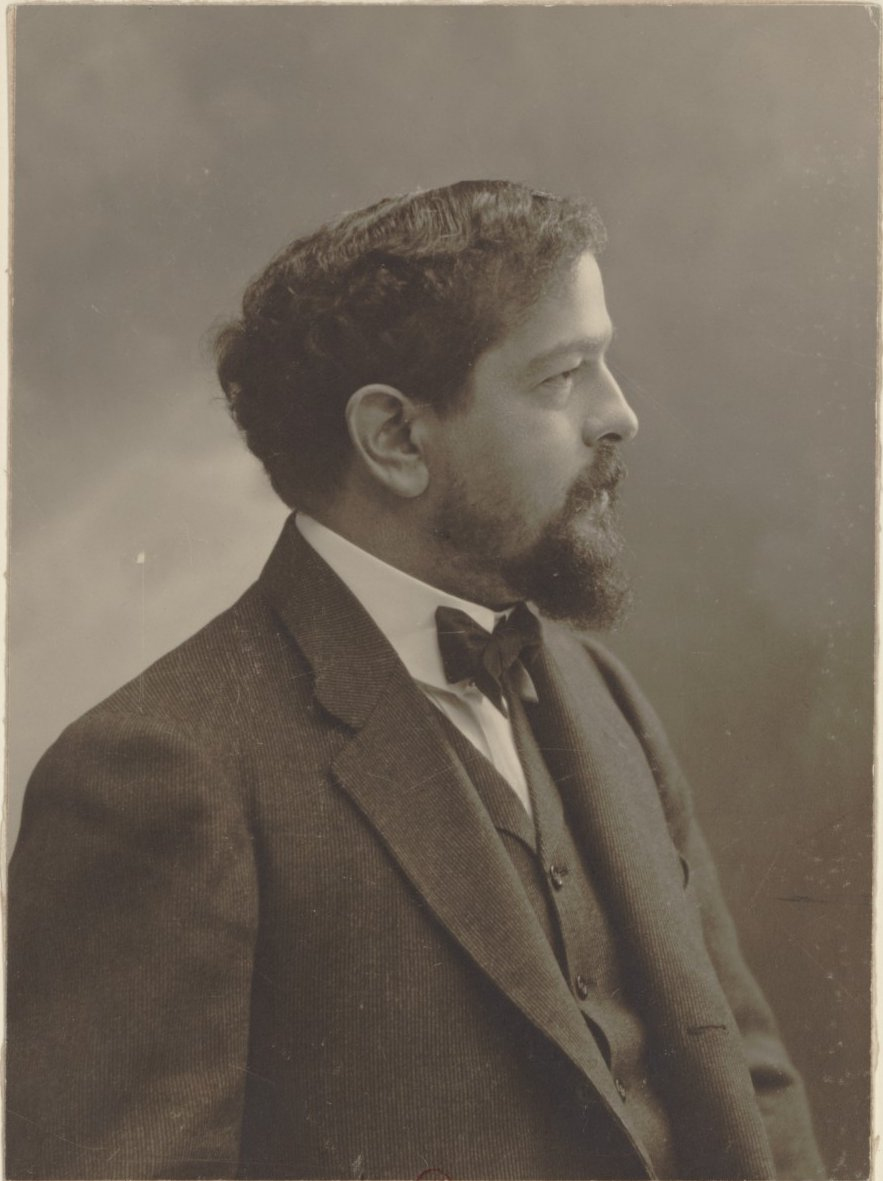
French impressionist composer Claude Debussy (c. 1905), whose La mer is sometimes used as a reference point for analysis of The Oceanides

=== Relation to Impressionism ===
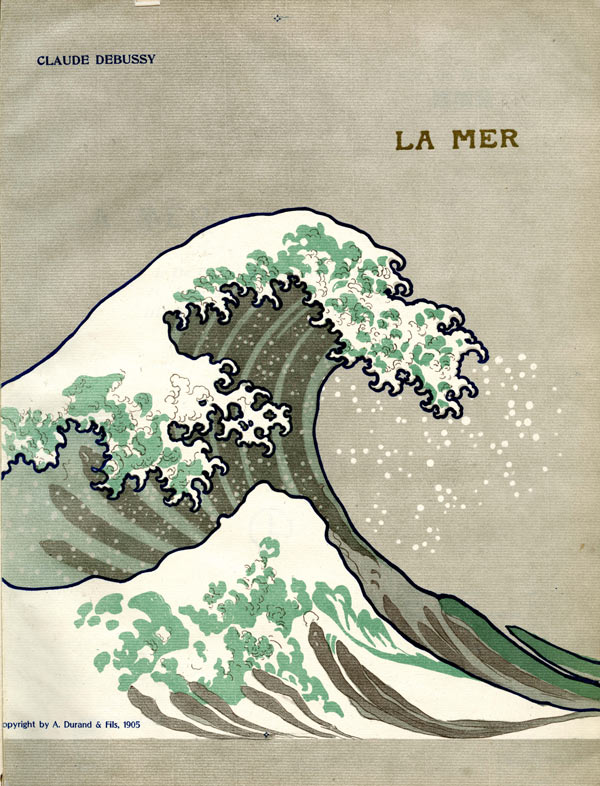
The 1905 edition of Debussy's La mer

Stylistically, many commentators have described The Oceanides as broadly impressionistic, in particular drawing comparisons with Debussy's La mer. Harold Johnson, for example, writes that the themes and orchestration of the piece, with muted string tremolos and harp glissandi, "bear more than a superficial resemblance" to Debussy's style (he further suggests that Sibelius may have feared his original title, Rondeau der Wellen, was "too close to Debussy"). Gray, who calls the orchestral technique in The Oceanides "strikingly different" from anything else in Sibelius's oeuvre, stresses that the work is far from "derivative". Rather, he argues that Sibelius builds upon and revolutionizes the French impressionist technique, making it "entirely his own, and not merely a reflection or distortion of Debussy". Gray continues:

The French masters of the method and their imitators in other countries confined their attention for the most part to an exploitation of the possibilities afforded by the upper reaches of the orchestral register, and to the attainment, principally, of effects of brilliance and luminosity. Debussy's writing for the lower instruments, and for the double-bases in particular, is as a general rule timid and conventional in comparison with his treatment of the higher instruments, as a result, doubtless, of his exaggerated fear of thickness of texture. In The Oceanides Sibelius has explored the lower depths of the orchestra more thoroughly than any one had previously done, and applied the impressionist method of scoring to the bass instruments, thereby achieving effects of sonority hitherto unknown.

While conceding the impressionistic feel of The Oceanides, Nils-Eric Ringbom warns that the comparison with Debussy should not be taken too far. Whereas in Debussy's works "there is seldom anything that grows thematically or undergoes development" (instead, Debussy marvels the listener with "his mastery in rendering dreamy, passive moods and fleeting, restrained emotions"), Sibelius places "too much weight on the logical development of his musical ideas to let ... them flicker out in the empty nothingness of thematic instability"; in other words, he insists that "atmospheric background swallow neither action nor structure". Sibelius's impressionism is thus "far more ... active" than Debussy's.

Other commentators have cautioned against the conclusion that The Oceanides is either an example of impressionism or somehow stylistically indebted to Debussy. Tawaststjerna, for example, believes that the piece's "anchorage in the major-minor harmony and the relatively sparing use of modal and whole-tone formulae" indicates that the tone poem "belongs to the world of late romanticism", the impressionistic character of its texture, harmonic vocabulary, and rhythmic patterns notwithstanding. Hurwitz has likewise criticized the "roaring cataract of nonsense in the Sibelius literature" about the influence of the French impressionists on the composer. "Similar musical problems often produce similar solutions", Hurwitz notes. "In this case, any symphonic portrait of the ocean is bound to rely more on texture and color than on vocal melody, for the simple reason that the ocean is not a person and does not sing ... nor does it lend itself to ... [an] anthropomorphic approach ...". Layton detects the presence of "normal Sibelian procedures and techniques" in The Oceanides, dismissing any serious debt to Debussy. "Its growth from the opening bars onward is profoundly organic", Layton writes. "And its apparent independence from the rest of Sibelius's work is manifest only at a superficial level".

=== Relation to The Bard ===
The Oceanides traces back to sketches for a three-movement suite for orchestra in E♭ major that Sibelius likely had begun in 1913; today, only No. 2 (Tempo moderato) and No. 3 (Allegro) survive. Andrew Barnett has speculated as to the whereabouts of the lost first movement from the pre-Oceanides suite. Although it is likely the opening number was either misplaced or destroyed by the composer, Barnett argues that four pieces of "circumstantial evidence" indicate the movement has survived—albeit in different form—as the tone poem The Bard, written in 1913 and revised the following year:

1. The first 26 (numbered) pages of the manuscript paper for the pre-Oceanides suite are missing; assuming the first page would have been reserved for the title, this means that the missing first movement likely consisted of 25 pages. Importantly, the fair copy of the final version of The Bard is about the same length (26 pages).
2. The orchestration of The Bard and the suite's surviving second and third movements are "virtually identical" to each other, employing a small orchestra "noticeably less extravagant" than either the D♭ major or D major versions of The Oceanides.
3. Sibelius's publishers, Breitkopf & Härtel, thought The Bard sounded like the first movement of a suite rather than a stand-alone concert piece. Sibelius vacillated back and forth, at first agreeing to recast the piece as a "fantasy in two parts, or an Intrada and Allegro", and then as a triptych in June 1913, before deciding sometime around July or August that The Bard should remain as an independent composition.
4. The thematic material of the suite's second movement (which is not found in the final version of The Oceanides) is closely related to a piece for solo piano called Till trånaden (To Longing, JS 202). Assuming The Bard was inspired by Finnish poet J. L. Runeberg's poem of the same name (toward the end of his life, Sibelius denied any Runeberg connection), in the first volume of the poet's "Collected Works" the title Till trånaden appears a page or two after The Bard, supporting the idea of a link between The Bard and the suite.

== Discography ==
Despite its "haunting beauty", The Oceanides has received fewer recordings than more famous Sibelius tone poems such as En saga, The Swan of Tuonela, and Tapiola. The first recording of The Oceanides was made in 1936 with Sir Adrian Boult conducting the BBC Symphony Orchestra, a performance that is noticeably quicker than average. The first recordings of the Yale version (7:25) and the pre-Oceanides suite (No. 2 Tempo moderato, 2:42; No. 3 Allegro, 4:35) are by Osmo Vänskä and the Lahti Symphony Orchestra under the BIS label (BIS-CD-1445, Rondo of the Waves); both were recorded in January 2003. The album premiered to considerable acclaim. The Guardian's Andrew Clements labeled the record the best of 2003, noting that the early versions of The Oceanides permitted the listener to see "the mechanics of musical genius laid bare". The table below contains these and other commercially available recordings of The Oceanides:

No.	Conductor	Orchestra	Rec. (Note: Refers to the year in which the performers recorded the work; this may not be the same as the year in which the recording was first released to the general public.)	Time	Recording venue	Label	Ref.
1	Sir Adrian Boult (1)	BBC Symphony Orchestra	1936	8:06	Abbey Road Studio No. 1	Warner Classics	
2	Eugen Jochum	Bavarian Radio Symphony Orchestra	1955	8:51	Herkulessaal	Deutsche Grammophon	
3	Sir Thomas Beecham	Royal Philharmonic Orchestra	1955	10:23	Abbey Road Studio No. 1	EMI Classics	
4	Eugene Ormandy (1)	Philadelphia Orchestra (1)	1955	8:20	Academy of Music, Philadelphia	Sony Classical	
5	Sir Adrian Boult (2)	London Philharmonic Orchestra	1956	9:08	Walthamstow Town Hall	SOMM	
6	Antal Doráti	London Symphony Orchestra (1)	1969	10:12	Abbey Road Studio No. 1	EMI Classics	
7	Eugene Ormandy (2)	Philadelphia Orchestra (2)	1976	10:30	Scottish Rite Cathedral, Philadelphia	Sony Classical	
8	Paavo Berglund (1)	Bournemouth Symphony Orchestra	1972	10:55	Southampton Guildhall	EMI Classics	
9	Sir Alexander Gibson	Royal Scottish National Orchestra	1977	10:40	Glasgow City Halls	Chandos	
10	Sir Simon Rattle	City of Birmingham Symphony Orchestra	1984	10:32	Warwick Arts Centre	EMI Classics	
11	Neeme Järvi (1)	Gothenburg Symphony Orchestra (1)	1984	10:15	Gothenburg Concert Hall	BIS	
12	Paavo Berglund (2)	Helsinki Philharmonic Orchestra (1)	1986	8:28	Kulttuuritalo	Warner Classics	
13	Jukka-Pekka Saraste	Finnish Radio Symphony Orchestra	1988	9:52	Kulttuuritalo	RCA Red Seal	
14	Vassily Sinaisky	Moscow Philharmonic Orchestra	1991	9:04	Mosfilm Studios	Brilliant Classics	
15	Neeme Järvi (2)	Gothenburg Symphony Orchestra (2)	1995	10:23	Gothenburg Concert Hall	Deutsche Grammophon	
16	Sir Andrew Davis	Royal Stockholm Philharmonic Orchestra (1)	1996	8:57	Stockholm Concert Hall	Finlandia	
17	Sir Colin Davis (1)	London Symphony Orchestra (2)	1998	10:57	Walthamstow Assembly Hall	RCA Red Seal	
18	Leif Segerstam	Helsinki Philharmonic Orchestra (2)	1998	11:15	Hyvinkääsali	Ondine	
19	Petri Sakari	Iceland Symphony Orchestra	2000	10:18	[unknown venue], Reykjavík	Naxos	
20	Osmo Vänskä	Lahti Symphony Orchestra	2000	10:03	Sibelius Hall	BIS	
†	Osmo Vänskä	Lahti Symphony Orchestra	2003	7:25	Sibelius Hall	BIS	
21	Sir Mark Elder	Hallé Orchestra	2006	10:23	Bridgewater Hall	Hallé	
22	Sir Colin Davis (2)	London Symphony Orchestra (3)	2008	11:59	Barbican Centre	LSO Live	
†	Sakari Oramo	BBC Symphony Orchestra	2015	9:44	Barbican Centre	BBC Music Magazine	
23	Edward Gardner	Bergen Philharmonic Orchestra	2016	10:03	Grieg Hall	Chandos	
24	Thomas Søndergård	BBC National Orchestra of Wales	2018	9:47	BBC Hoddinott Hall	Linn	
25	Andris Poga	Stavanger Symphony Orchestra	?	9:29	?	Berlin Classics	

† = original 'Yale' version (1914)

== Sources ==
Books

- Barnett, Andrew (2007). Sibelius. New Haven: Yale University Press. ISBN 9780300111590.
- Dahlström, Fabian [in Swedish] (2003). Jean Sibelius: Thematisch-bibliographisches Verzeichnis seiner Werke [Jean Sibelius: A Thematic Bibliographic Index of His Works] (in German). Wiesbaden: Breitkopf & Härtel. ISBN 3-7651-0333-0.
- Gray, Cecil (1931). Sibelius. London: Oxford University Press.
- Griffiths, Paul (2005). The Penguin Companion to Classical Music. Penguin Books. ISBN 9780140515596.
- Grimley, Daniel (2004). "The Tone Poems: Genre, Landscape and Structural Perspective". In Grimley, Daniel (ed.). The Cambridge Companion to Sibelius. Cambridge Companions to Music. London: Cambridge University Press. ISBN 9780521894609.
- Hurwitz, David (2007). Sibelius: The Orchestral Works, an Owner's Manual. Pompton Plains, New Jersey: Amadeus Press. ISBN 9781574671490.
- Johnson, Harold (1959). Jean Sibelius. New York: Alfred A. Knopf. OCLC 603128.
- Kilpeläinen, Kari (2012). "Introduction" (PDF). In Sibelius, Jean (ed.). Aallottaret : eine Tondichtung für großes Orchester (Early version) [op. 73]; Die Okeaniden - Aallottaret : eine Tondichtung für großes Orchester op. 73; Tapiola : Tondichtung für großes Orchester op. 112. ISMN 979-0-004-80322-6. OCLC 833823092. Archived from the original (PDF) on 2015-06-20. Complete Works (JSW) edited by the National Library of Finland and the Sibelius Society of Finland Series I (Orchestral works) Vol. 16: The Oceanides Op. 73 / Tapiola Op. 112 edited by Kari Kilpeläinen.
- Layton, Robert (1965). Sibelius: The Masters Musicians Series. New York: Schirmer Books. ASIN B0000CMRUD.
- Rickards, Guy (1997). Jean Sibelius. London: Phaidon. ISBN 9780714835815.
- Ringbom, Nils-Eric (1954). Jean Sibelius: A Master and His Work. Norman, Oklahoma: University of Oklahoma Press. ISBN 9780806103075.
- Tawaststjerna, Erik (1986). Sibelius: Volume 2, 1904–1914. (Robert Layton, English translation). London: Faber and Faber. ISBN 9780571247738.
- Tawaststjerna, Erik (1997). Sibelius: Volume 3, 1914–1957. (Robert Layton, English translation). London: Faber and Faber. ISBN 9780571247745.

Journal articles

- Santos Rutschman, Kirsten (2014). "Jean Sibelius, Lemminkäinen, Op. 22 (early versions), edited by Tuija Wickland. Jean Sibelius Works I/12s (Wiesbaden, Leipzig, Paris: Breitkopf & Härtel, 2013), xxii + 313pp. € 199,50". Nineteenth-Century Music Review. 11 (2). Cambridge University Press: 389–393. doi:10.1017/S1479409814000482. (subscription required)
- Stoeckel, Carl (1971). "Some Recollections of the Visit of Sibelius to America in 1914". Scandinavian Studies. 43 (1). University of Illinois Press: 53–88. JSTOR 40917124. (subscription required)

Websites

- Clements, Andrew (2003). "Anyone Need a Tune-up?". theguardian.com.
- Crawford, John Martin (1888). "The Kalevala". sacred-texts.com.
- Hepokoski, James; Dahlström, Fabian. "Sibelius, Jean". Grove Music Online. (subscription required)
- Sirén, Vesa (2005). "The Oceanides". Sibelius.fi. Archived from the original on June 24, 2015.
- Telin, Mike (2015). "Conductor Susanna Mälkki to Make Her Cleveland Orchestra Debut". clevelandclassical.com.
