= Norfolk Chamber Music Festival =

Music festival in Connecticut, US

The Norfolk Chamber Music Festival, hosted in Norfolk, Connecticut, is a summer music festival. Set among the Litchfield Hills of the lower Berkshires, the Festival traces its roots to the Battell family, who started hosting summer concerts on the Norfolk town green in the 1880s. It is hosted by the Yale School of Music.

== History ==
Robbins Battell (1819–1895) was the seventh son of a wealthy Norfolk, CT family. He was a patron of music, as well as, a skilled amateur flutist and composer. After graduating from Yale University in 1839, he returned to Norfolk to manage the family business enterprises, and used his wealth for various musical enterprises. Beginning in the 1880s he financed a week-long series of concerts on the green. This concert series became what is now known as the Norfolk Festival.

Robbins’ daughter, Ellen (1851–1939), continued her father's legacy of bringing music to Norfolk; she and her husband started the Litchfield County Choral Union which continues to perform at the Norfolk Festival to this day. Under Carl and Ellen, Norfolk soon became the first internationally known classical music festival in America. The Stoeckels assumed the entire expense of the concerts which took place on their estate. These concerts rapidly became extravagant affairs with parties and picnics and were among the most popular summer social events in New England. They recruited a 70-piece orchestra of musicians from the New York Philharmonic and Metropolitan Opera, and paid for a special train to transport the instrumentalists to the Litchfield Hills.

In 1906, to accommodate the ever-growing crowds at the festival, the couple built a concert hall known as the Music Shed. They commissioned new works from many of the leading composers of their time and invited them to conduct their own premieres. Sibelius, for example, composed his tone poem The Oceanides for the Stoeckels and conducted it in the Music Shed during his only trip to the United States on June 4, 1915. The autographed manuscript is now in the Music Library at Yale University.

== The Yale School of Music in Norfolk ==
When Ellen Battell Stoeckel died in 1939 with no surviving children, she stipulated in her will that her estate was to be used in perpetuity for the “benefit and development of the School of Music of Yale University and for extending said University’s courses in music, art, and literature.” The Yale Summer School of Music was established in 1941. Since that time, the Norfolk Chamber Music Festival has played host to thousands of emerging young professional musicians. Today the Festival offers intensive tuition-free programs each summer to approximately eighty students in chamber music, new music and choral repertoire.

== The Music Shed ==
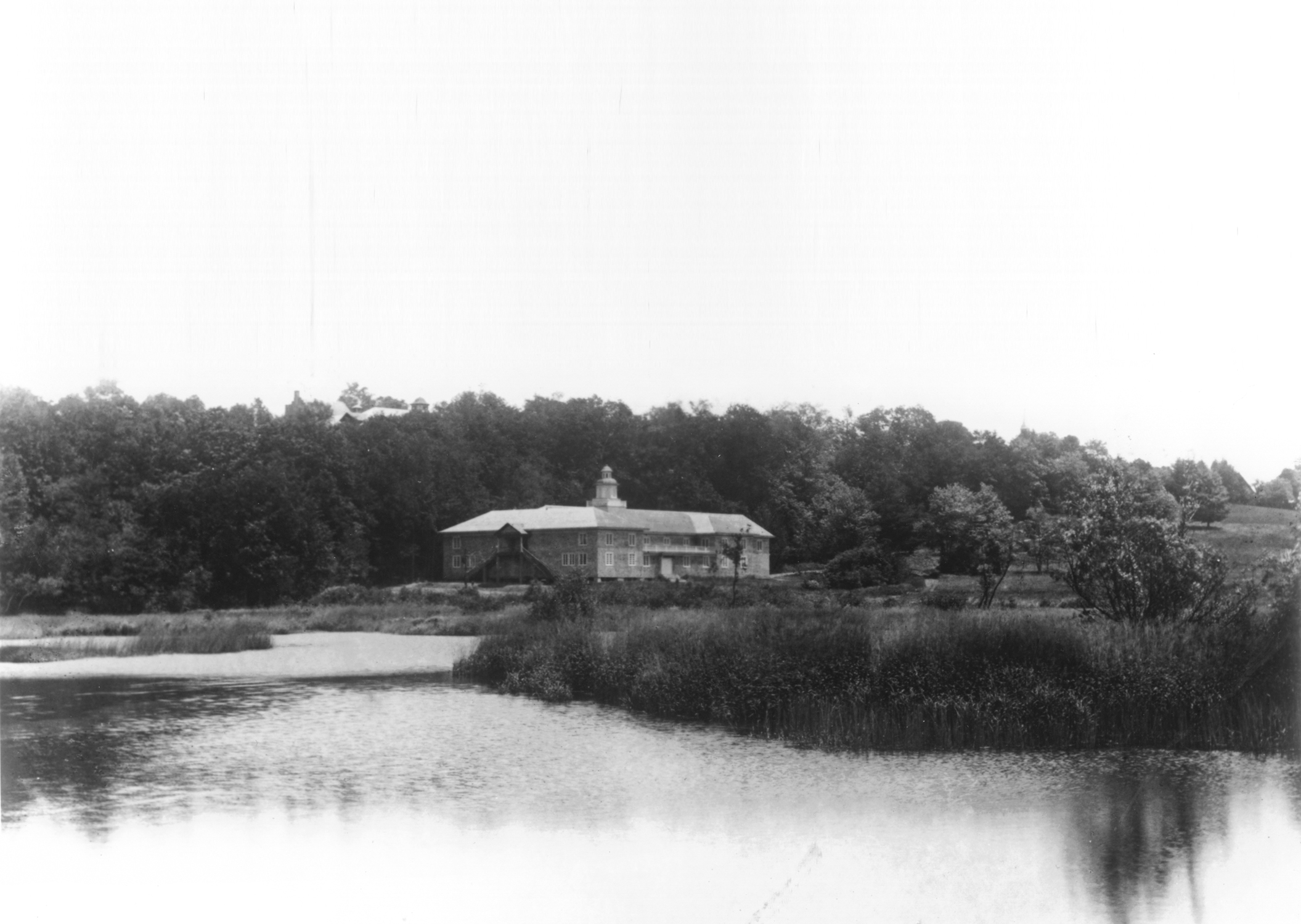
Exterior of the music shed

Designed by New York architect E.K. Rossiter, the Music Shed existed first as a separate prototype structure modelled after Steinway Hall in New York. A test concert was given in 1904. The success of the experimental hall led to the construction of the Music Shed which was built for the Litchfield County Choral Union and opened in 1906. The Shed had to be enlarged due to the number of Choir and audience members, and after an expansion in 1910, it could accommodate a Choir of 425 and an audience of 1,500. The Shed is built of cedar and lined with redwood.
