= Max Jensen =

German marine painter

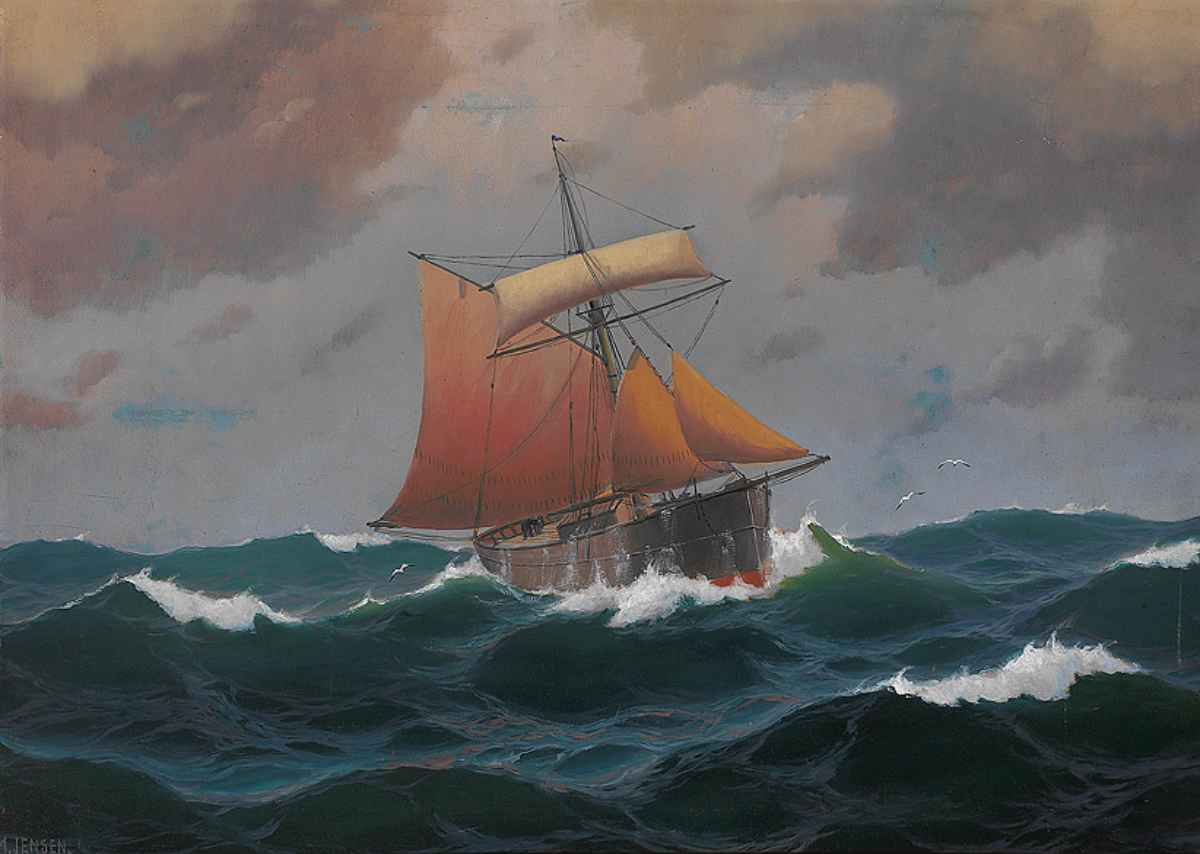
Schoner in bewegter See (around 1880)

Max Jensen (1860; fl. until 1908), was a German marine painter. He was active from 1877–1908 and studied at the Berlin Academy of Arts, after which he continued his studies at the Kunstakademie Düsseldorf. His paintings were shown at exhibitions in Germany, Denmark and Holland. Jensen lived in Berlin, but spent much time at the North Sea and Baltic coasts, observing marine landscapes.
