= Cantos of the Kalevala =

Summary of the Finnish-Karelian epic poem

This is a summary of the cantos of the Kalevala.

The Kalevala is considered the national epic of Finland. It was compiled and edited from the songs of numerous folk singers by Elias Lönnrot while he was a district health officer in eastern Finland, at that time under the governance of Russia as Grand Duchy of Finland. The Kalevala has been translated into about 48 languages and has been an important cultural inspiration for the Finnish people for many years. The poem consists of 50 cantos (runos) and 22,795 lines of poetry. The poem tells the story of a people, from the very beginning of the world to the introduction of Christianity.

== Cantos 1 – 10: First Väinämöinen Cycle ==
After a brief introduction to the poem and story by the singers in poetic form, the poem proper begins.

Canto I. – Birth of Väinämöinen

Ilmatar, the daughter of the air, descends to the sea and is fertilised; she becomes the Water-mother. She gestates for centuries to no avail and laments her lot.

Time passes, and Sotka, a goldeneye floats over the water seeking a place to rest and make her nest. It sees the knee of the Water-mother rising above the waves and, confusing it for a grassy hill, decides to make its nest there. On the third day the Water-mother feels her knee is too hot and fears it is burning. She twitches her leg and the eggs fall into the water, crashing into fragments.

The fragments of the eggs grow into the earth and heavens and sun and moon and stars and the final pieces into the clouds.

Within the Water-mother's womb, Väinämöinen is growing and turning. He laments his situation and prays to the gods to release him from his dark prison. When the gods fail to give him freedom, he forces his own way into the world; he slips into the sea and floats for nine years until he hits ground. He turns himself over on this new land and beholds the moon and stars and sun for the first time. (Note: (See below at Page references) Finnish Literature Society: Ensimmäinen Runo)

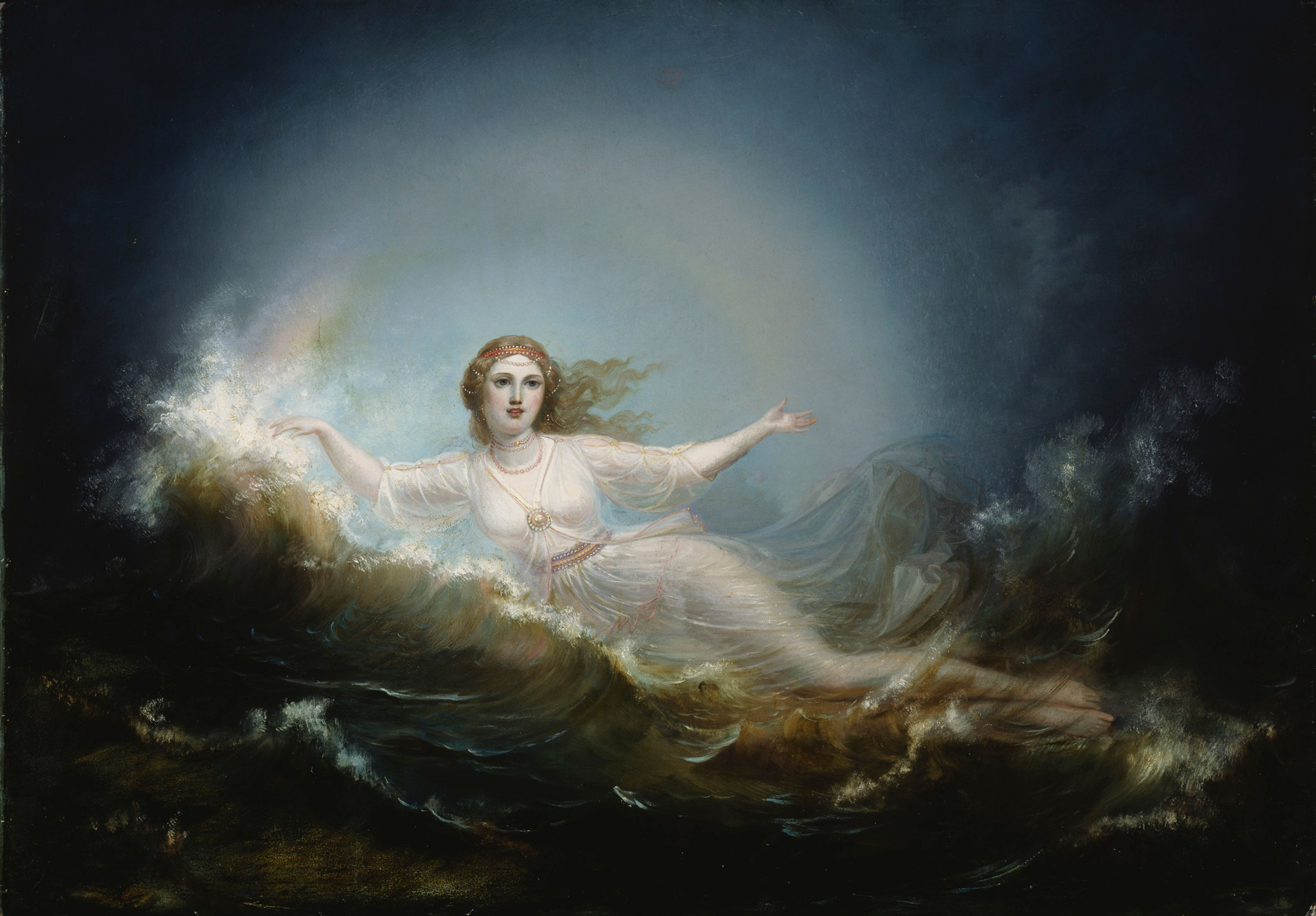
Ilmatar, Robert Wilhelm Ekman, 1860

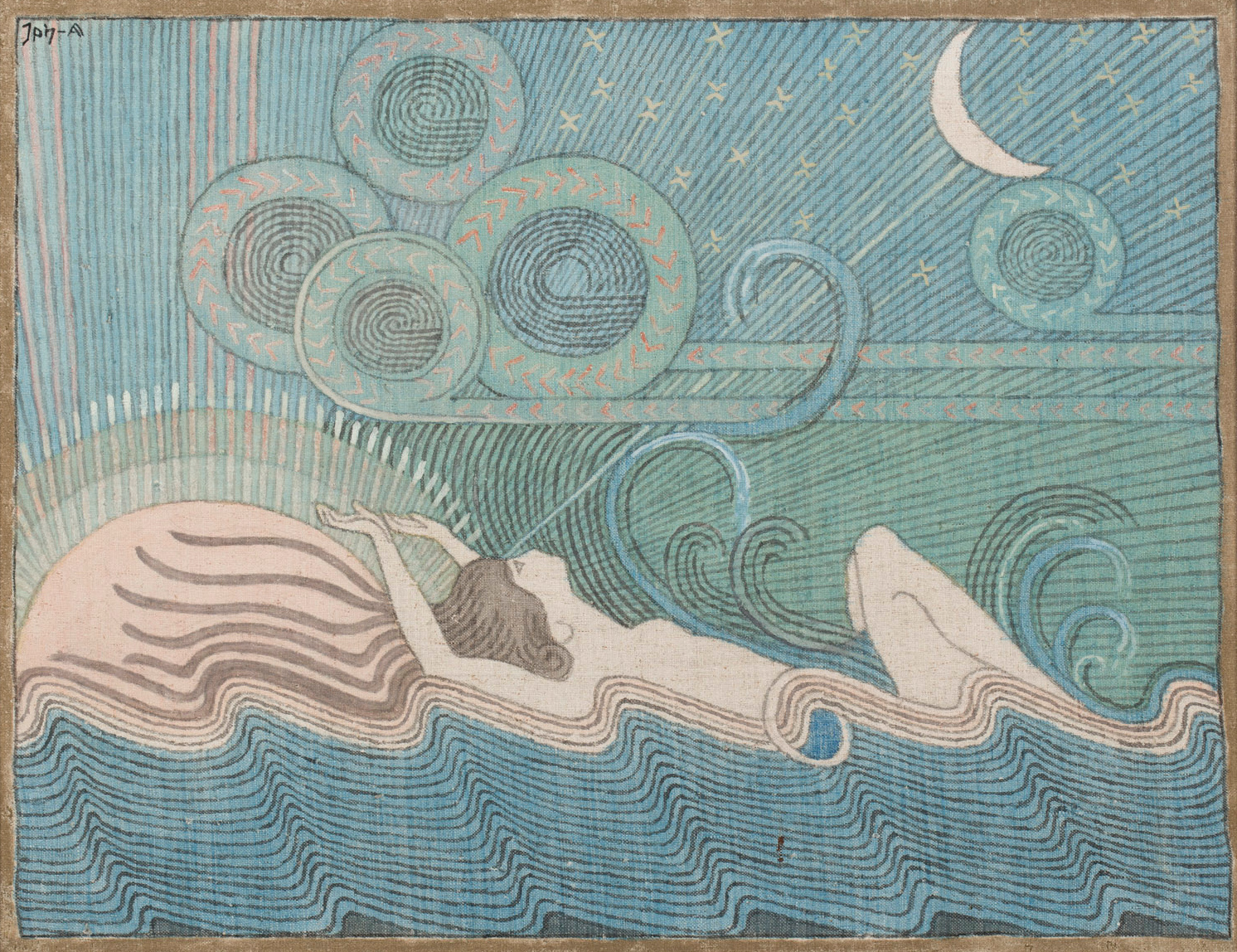
Ilmatar, Joseph Alanen, 1913–1916

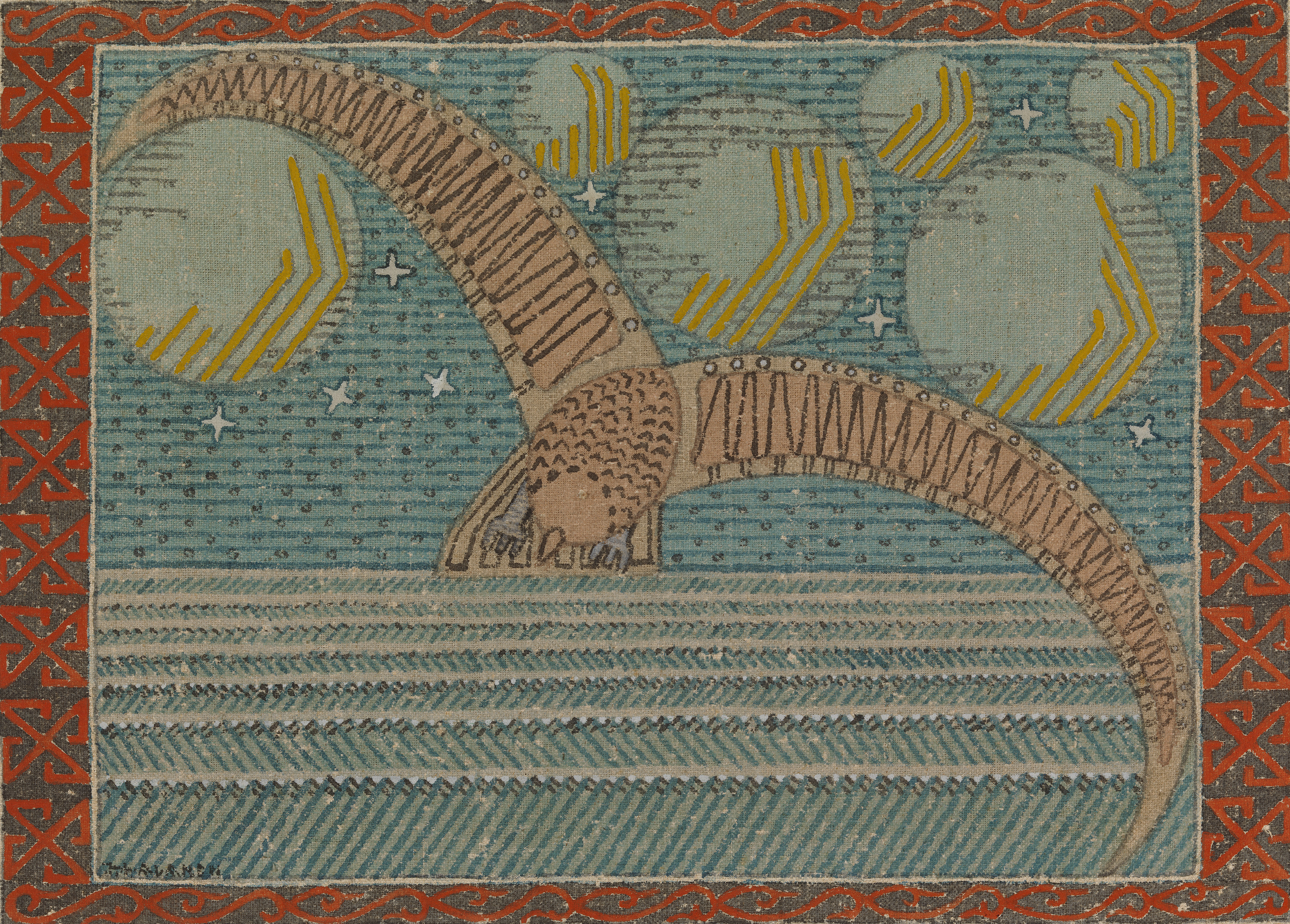
The Wild Duck and the Celestial Bodies, Joseph Alanen, 1919–1920, a golden eagle from Old Kalevala (1835) rather than a goldeneye

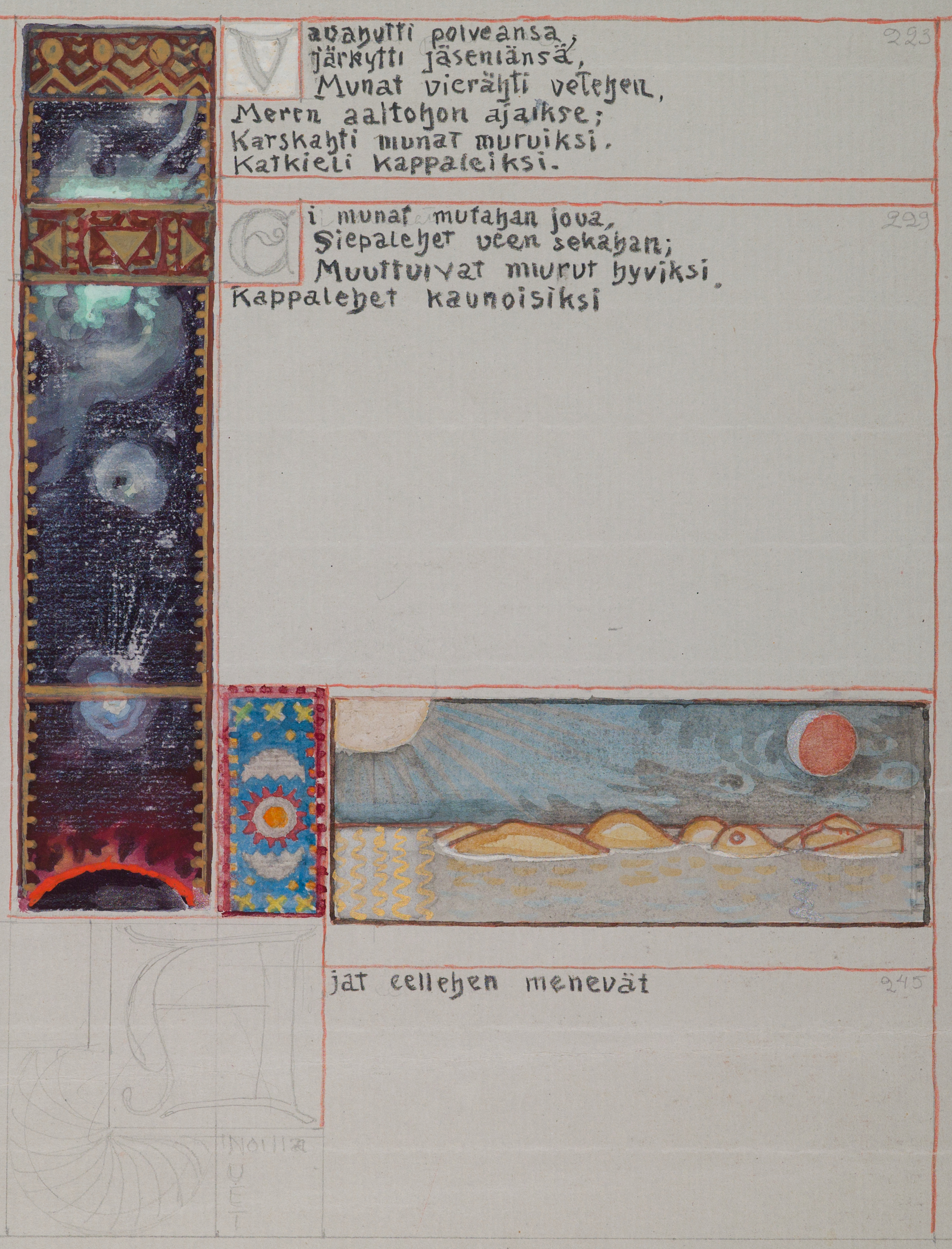
Formation of the celestial bodies and pregnant Ilmatar, a page from the unfinished Great Kalevala by Akseli Gallen-Kallela, early 20th century

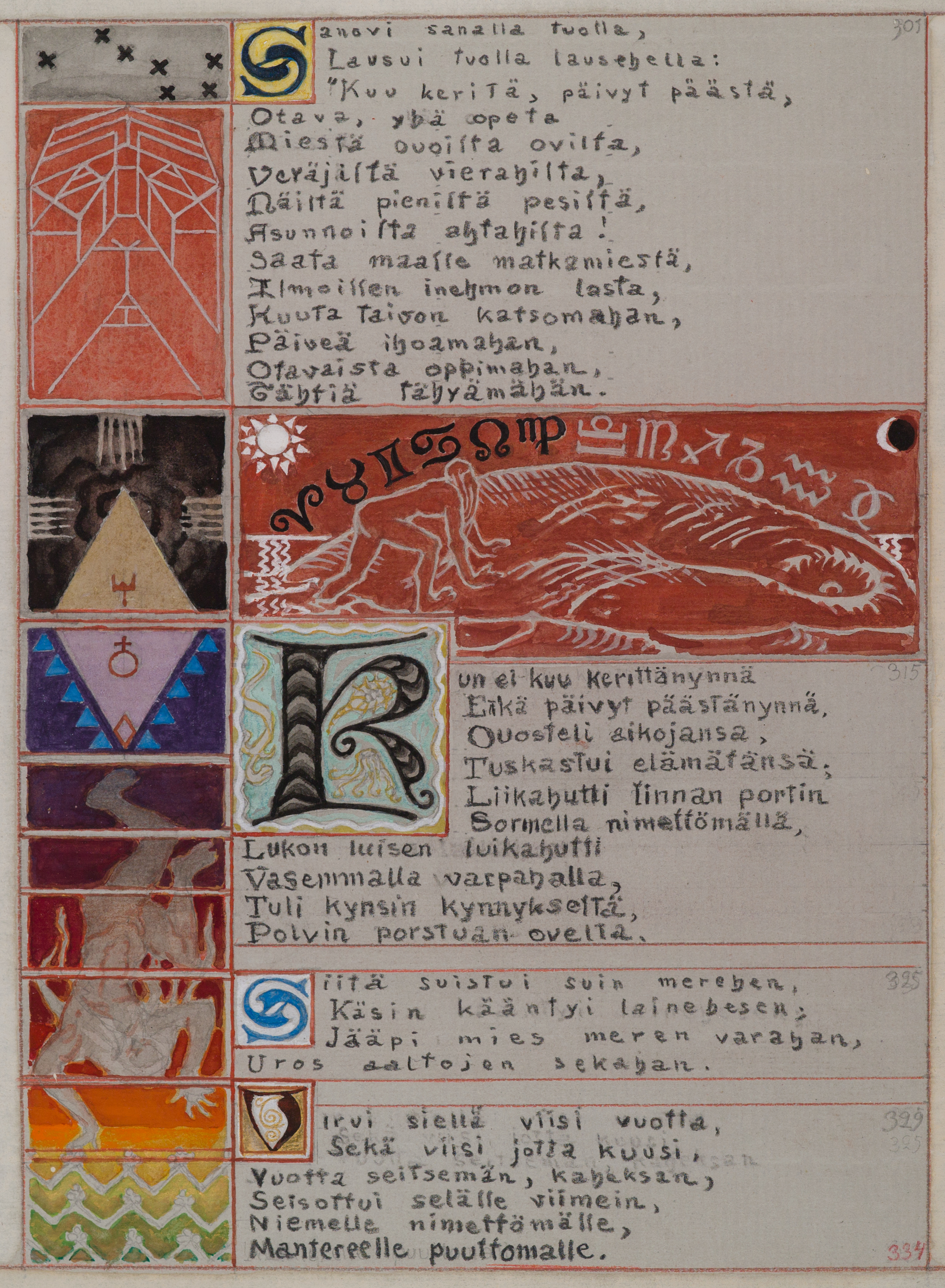
The birth of Väinämöinen, page from Great Kalevala by Gallen-Kallela, 1920–1930

Canto II. – Sowing of Life

Väinämöinen summons Sampsa Pellervoinen, the architect of the forests, to sow the land with trees. He sows many trees and in time they grow and flourish; however, the oak will not grow.

The sea monster Iku-Turso rises and burns a haystack. Into the ashes arrived an acorn that began to grow. It grows taller than any other tree in the land, growing up to heaven and blocking out the sun and moon. Väinämöinen calls the Water-mother to send him someone who can fell the great tree. A man appears from the water clad in copper from head to toe, a man no taller than a man's thumb.

Väinämöinen mocks the man, but the man grows so large his head in among the clouds. He swings his great copper axe, and the great oak is felled on the third stroke.

The remains of the great oak tree bring great things to those who lay claim to it and all is well. Forests grow well and the birds and woodland creatures thrive. However, Väinämöinen notices his grains do not grow. He fells the forests, but he leaves a birch tree for the birds to rest upon. An eagle is grateful for this, so it strikes up fire and burns the wood of the felled forest.

Väinämöinen takes his seeds once more and sows the land. In a matter of days the seeds are growing and the land is filled. Väinämöinen beholds the beauty of his fertile land. A cuckoo comes and sings in joy. (Note: FLS: Toinen Runo)

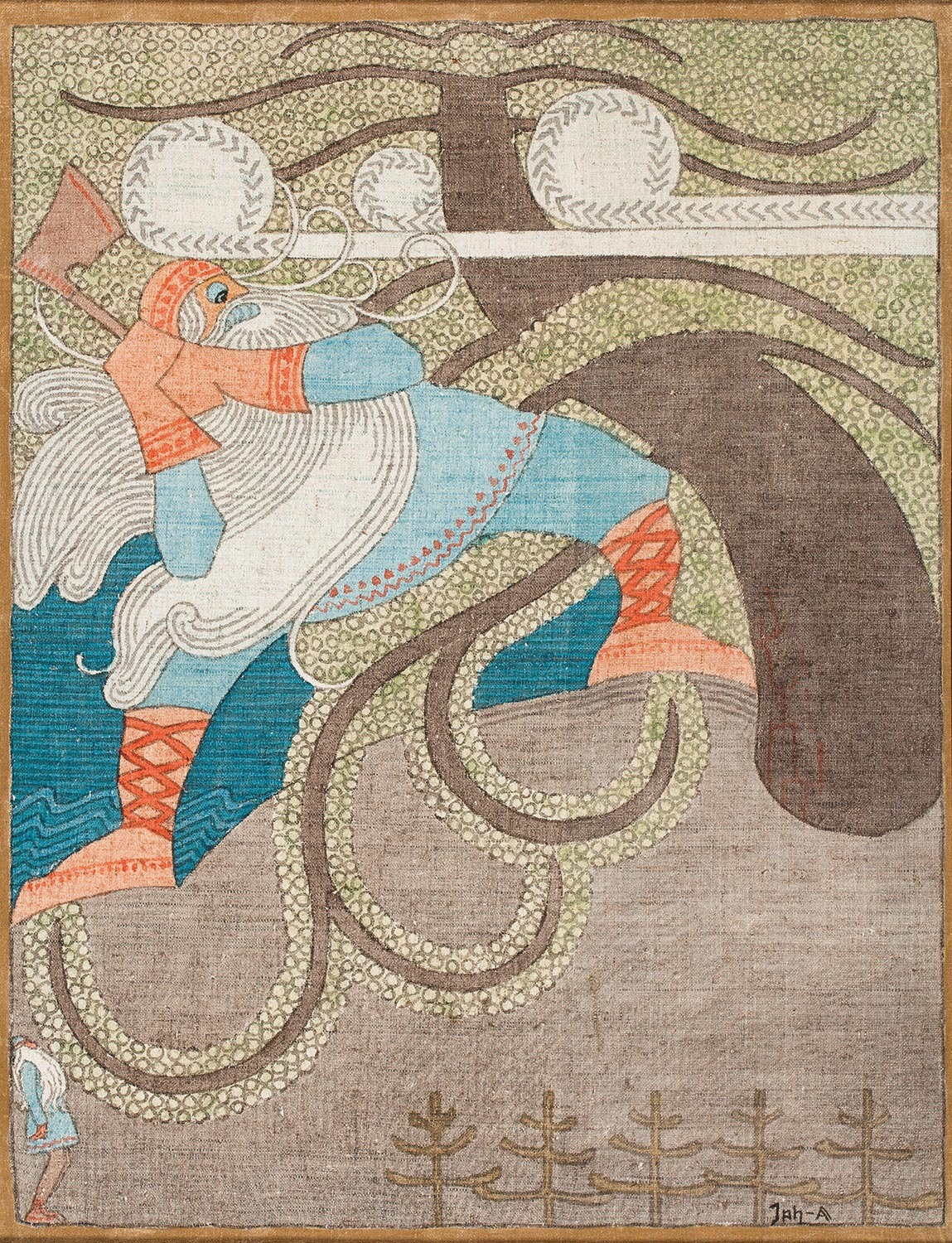
The Felling of the Great Oak, Joseph Alanen, 1919–1920

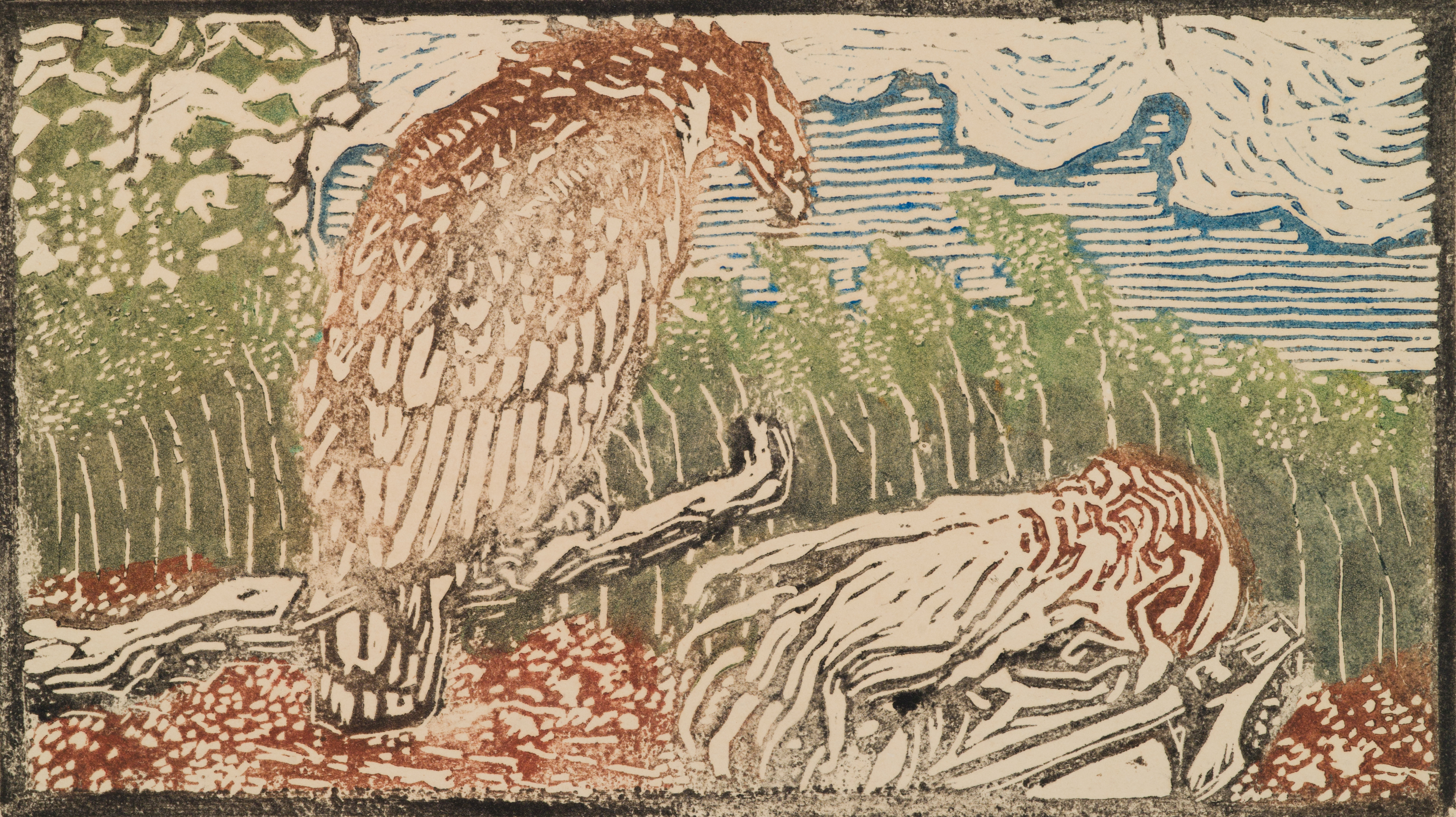
Sketch of Väinämöinen meeting the eagle, from Great Kalevala by Akseli Gallen-Kallela

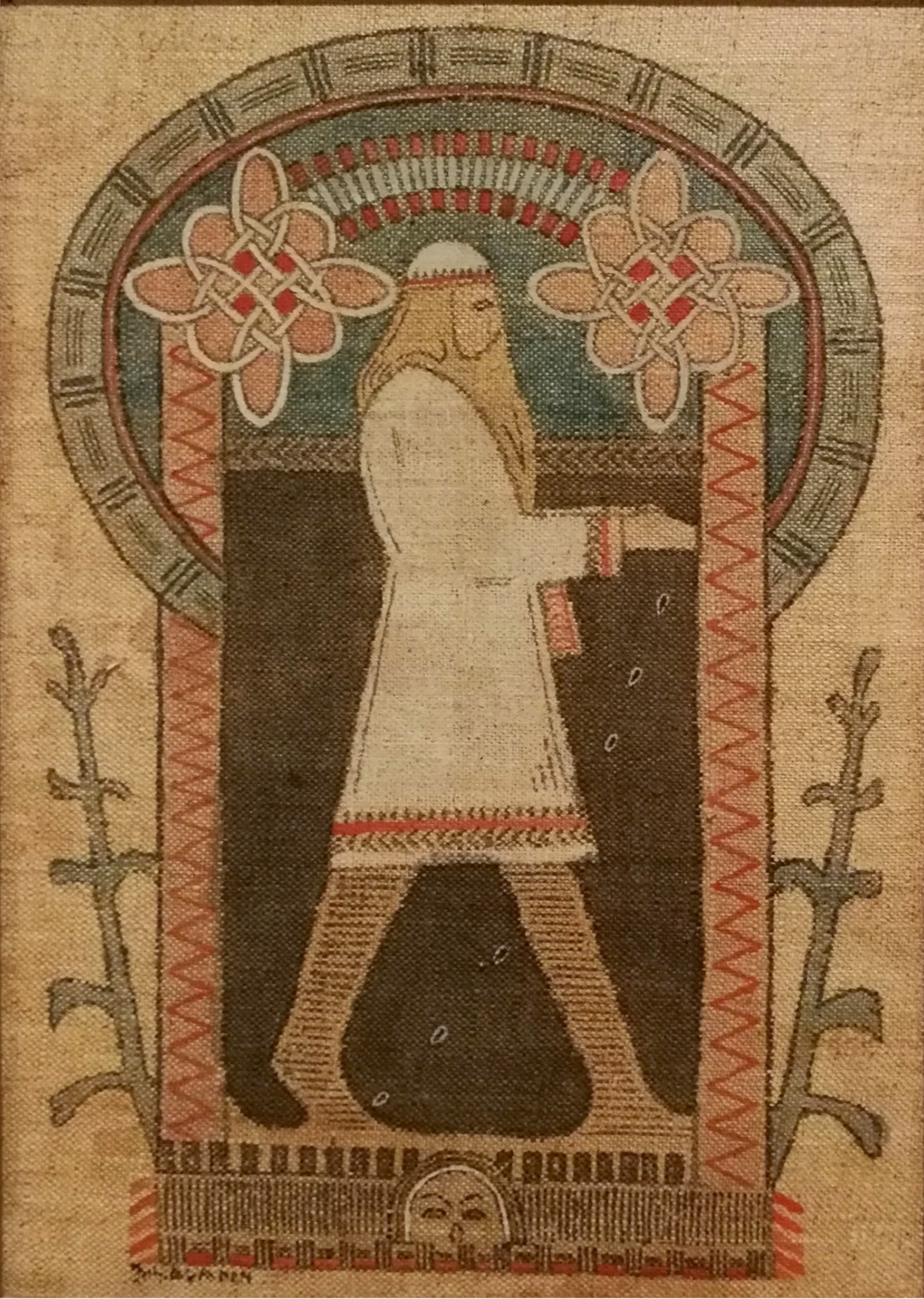
Väinämöinen's Sowing by Joseph Alanen

Canto III. – Väinämöinen and Joukahainen

The Lapland youth Joukahainen believes he can sing better songs than Väinämöinen. He informs his family he will defeat Väinämöinen in a battle of knowledge and song. His mother and father forbid him from such an unwise endeavour, but Joukahainen is young and arrogant and he does not listen. He sets out to do battle, and rides for three days solid. During the third day he and Väinämöinen collide, smashing both their sledges and causing a great mess.

A contest of knowledge ensues. Väinämöinen is not impressed with Joukahainen's primitive and childish knowledge and warns him to yield, but the youth does not, and he proceeds to lie about his achievements, annoying Väinämöinen. Young Joukahainen then challenges Väinämöinen to battle with blades; he informs him that he is not afraid of his childish threats and Joukahainen then begins to throw insults at Väinämöinen. This greatly angers the old wizard and he begins to sing; he sings Joukahainen's possessions into nature and the youth himself into the earth all the way to his shoulders.

Joukahainen panics. He offers all of his material possessions to Väinämöinen, but the old man is not interested. Then Joukahainen offers his sister Aino as his wife. Väinämöinen grows joyful and reverses his song-spell, releasing the young Joukahainen from the earth.

Glad of heart is Väinämöinen,

Full of joy the ancient minstrel,

That he thus has fought and won him

For his age a lovely maiden,

Sister of this Joukahainen.

So he seeks a place befitting,

Where to publish forth his pleasure,

Steps upon the rock of joyance,

On the stone of music seats him,

Sings a moment, sings and ceases,

Sings a second, then a third time,

So to turn away the magic,

So the potent spell to banish.

Now at last comes Joukahainen

Crawling from his oozy prison,

Lifts his knees from out the water,

Beard from out the bog and litter;

From the rock starts forth his stallion,

From the bramble glides his snow-sledge,

And from out the sedge his birch-rod.

Joukahainen returns to his home and weeps to his mother as he tells her the tale and his offer to Väinämöinen. His mother tells him not to sob. Aino overhears and weeps uncontrollably. Her mother tries to comfort her but to no avail, and Aino weeps for a long time. (Note: FLS: Kolmas Runo)

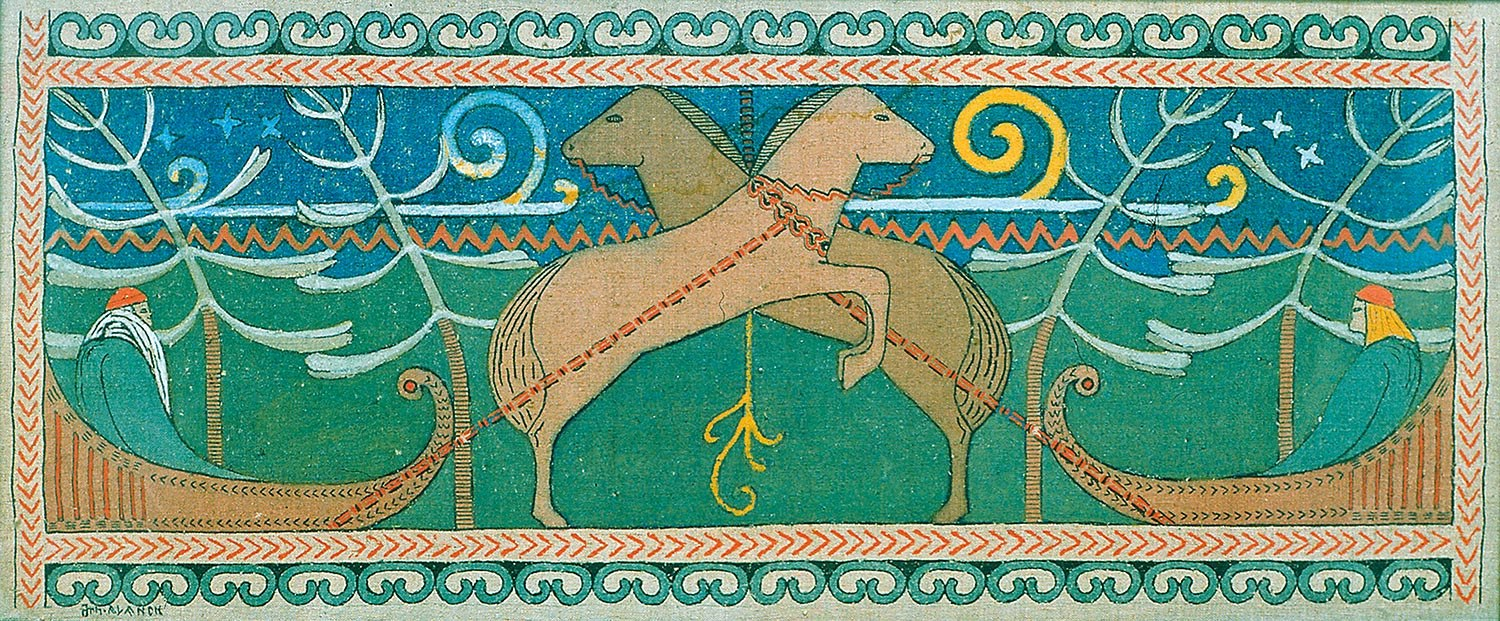
The Clash of Väinämöinen and Joukahainen, Joseph Alanen, 1909–1910

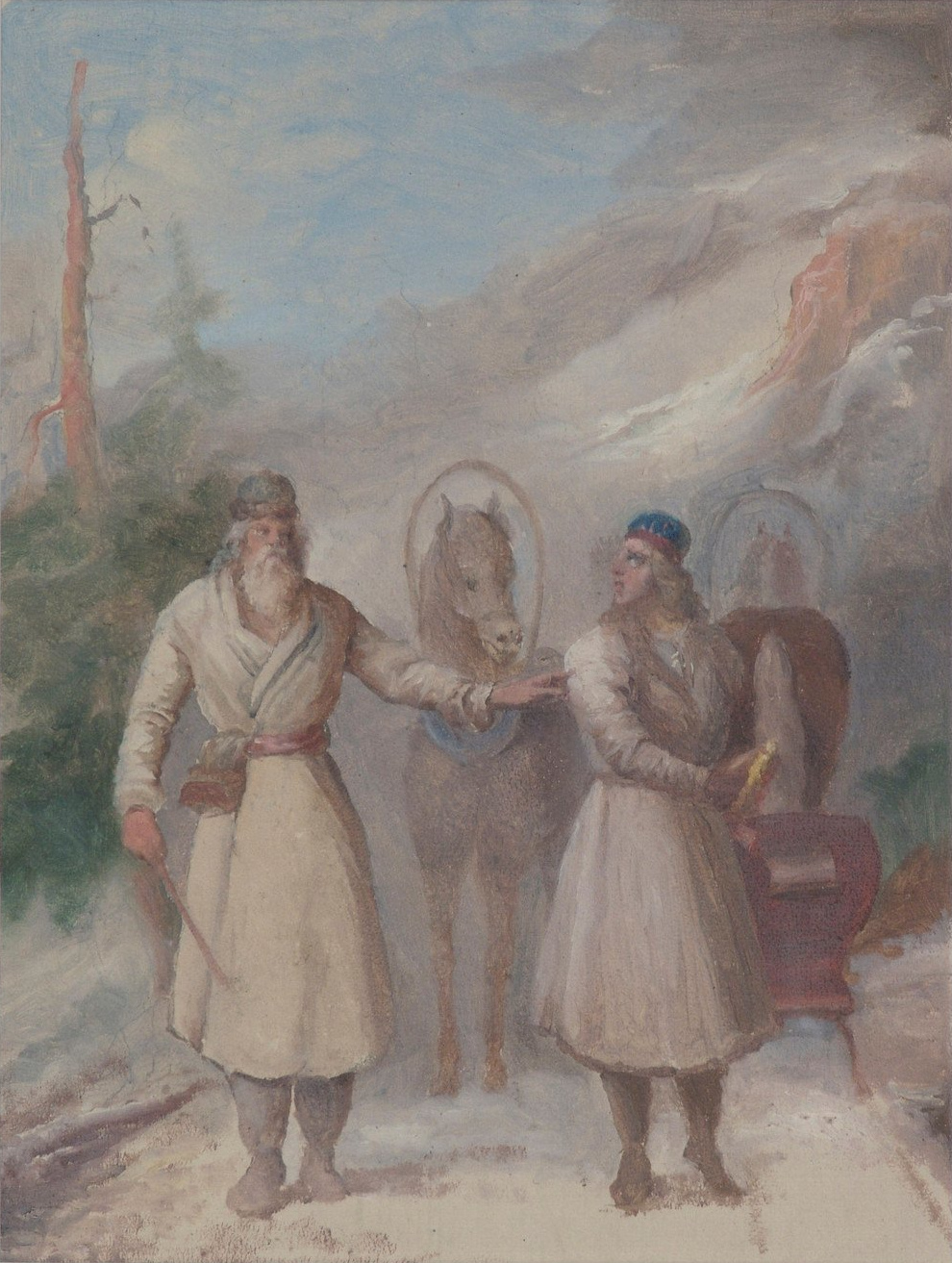
The Meeting of Väinämöinen and Joukahainen, Berndt Godenhjelm

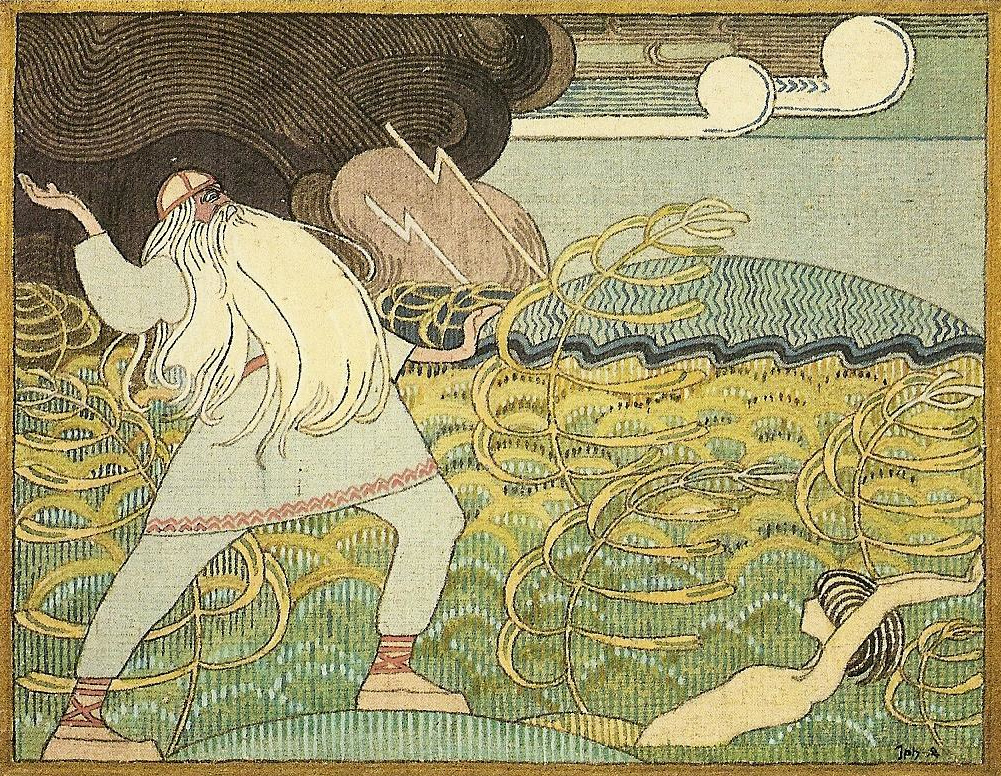
Väinämöinen Sings Joukahainen into a Mire, Joseph Alanen, 1912–1913

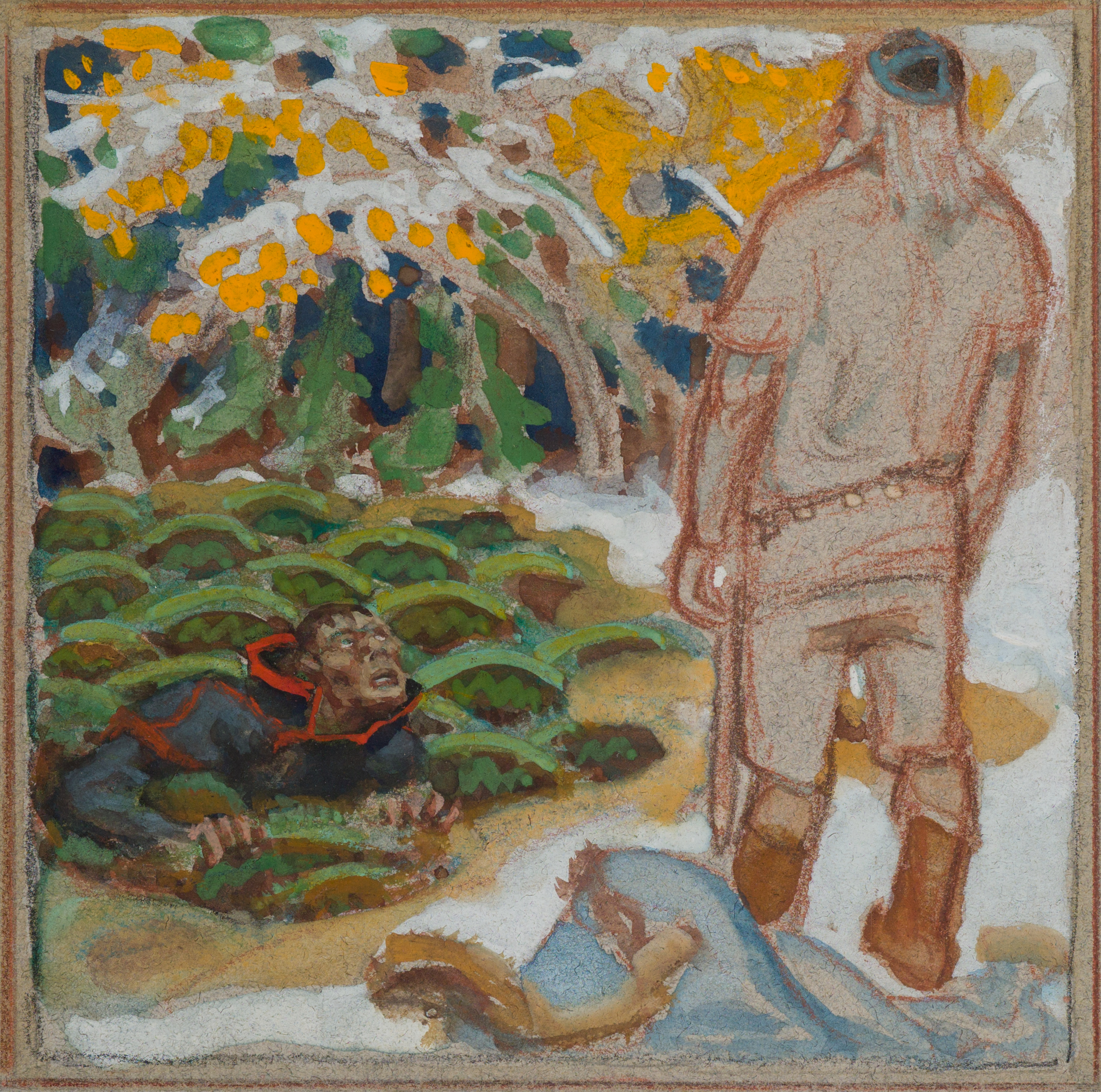
Joukahainen in the mire, Great Kalevala by Akseli Gallen-Kallela, 1925

Canto IV. – Fate of Aino

Aino goes to the forest to gather twigs and birch branches and meets with Väinämöinen, he asks her to be his and his alone and she responds with contempt, tearing her jewels and bangles from her person stating that she would rather wear the garb of a simple farm girl than be married to him, she runs home weeping.

When she arrives home she receives little sympathy from her father, brother or sister and when she goes for consolation to her mother she tells her to stop weeping and to prepare for married life. Aino's mother tells her of her younger life when she was a virgin bride and tries to instruct her in married life, but Aino does not want to listen, instead she goes away weeping. Aino weeps for days, her mother once again tries to console her.

Aino wanders to the storehouse and dresses in the finest clothes and jewels, she wanders through the countryside bewailing her lot, singing as she walks. She comes to a bay and over the water sees three maidens washing, she feels she should join then and throws her fine garments on the harsh rocks of the bay and proceeds to swim towards the rocky outcrop where the maidens are located. She reaches the rocky island and it sinks beneath her taking her form and soul with it.

A hare sets out from the waters edge to take the message of her death to her family. When her mother hears the tragic news she bitterly laments:

Never, O unhappy mothers,

Never while your life endureth,

Never may you urge your daughters,

Or attempt to force your children

To a marriage that repels them,

Like myself, O wretched mother,

Urging vainly thus my daughter,

Thus my little dove I fostered.

She then weeps for days, her tears forming three large rivers. (Note: FLS: Neljäs Runo)

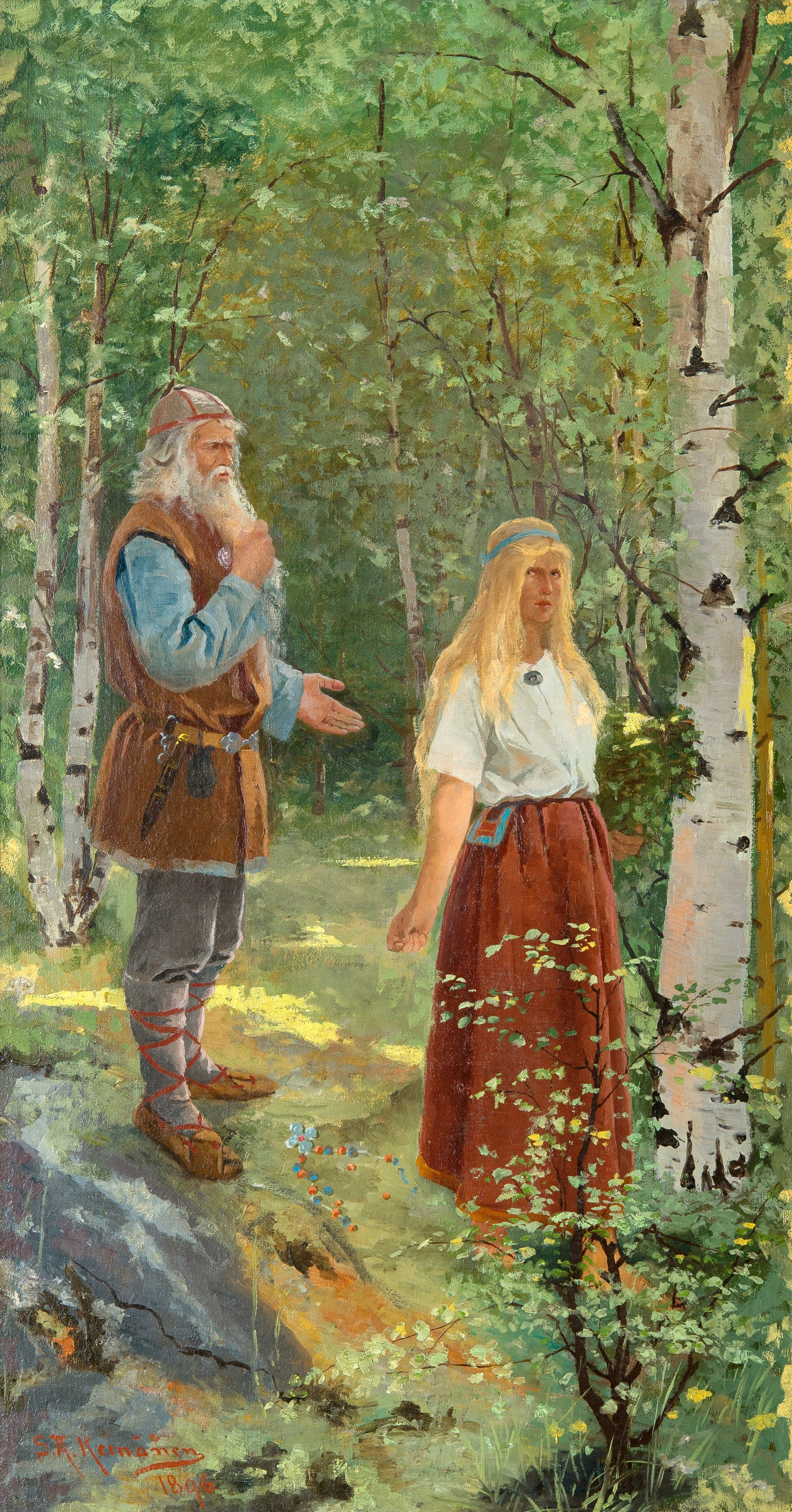
Väinämöinen and Aino, Sigfrid Keinänen, 1896

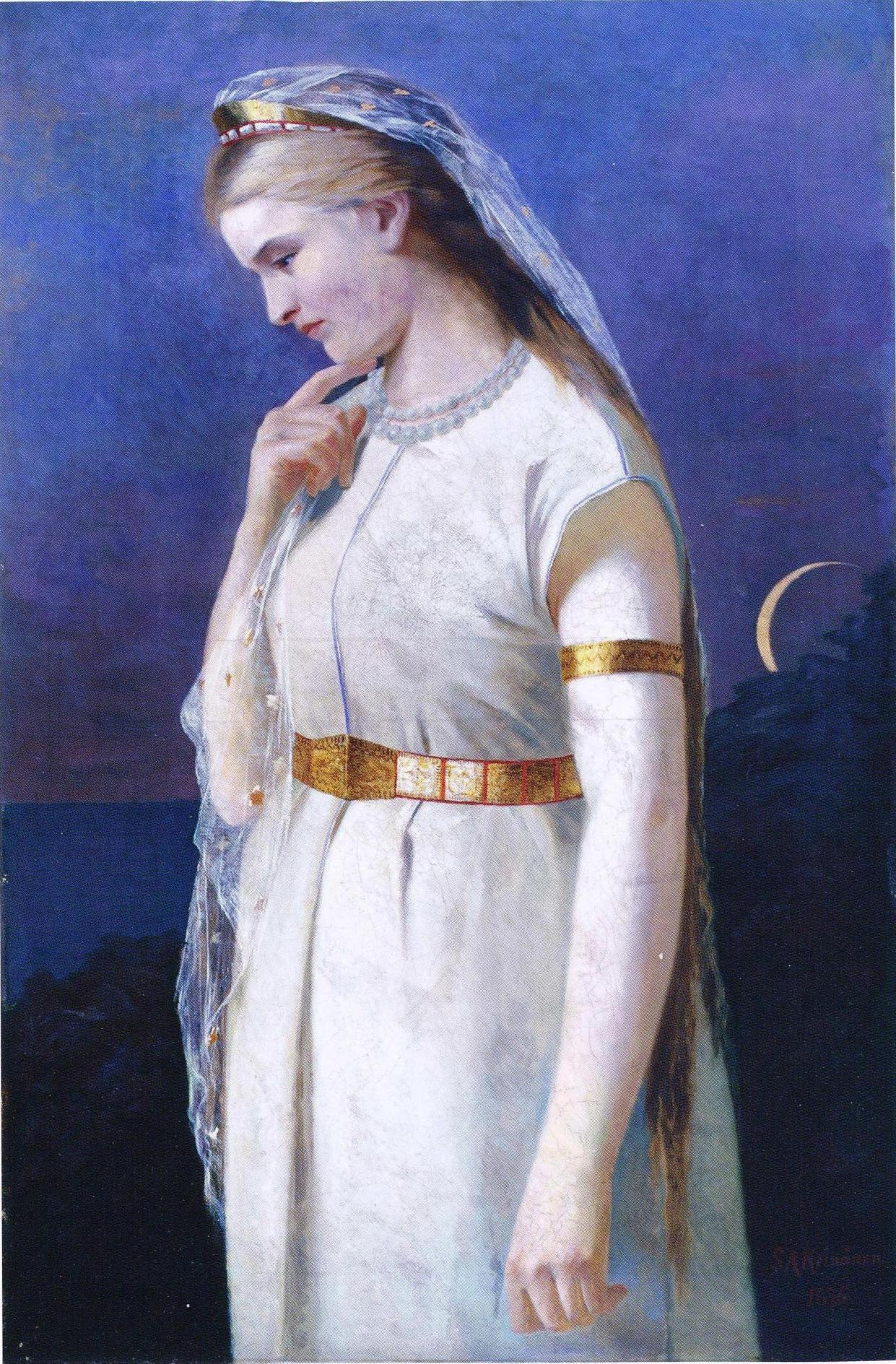
Aino by the Sea, Sigfrid Keinänen, 1876

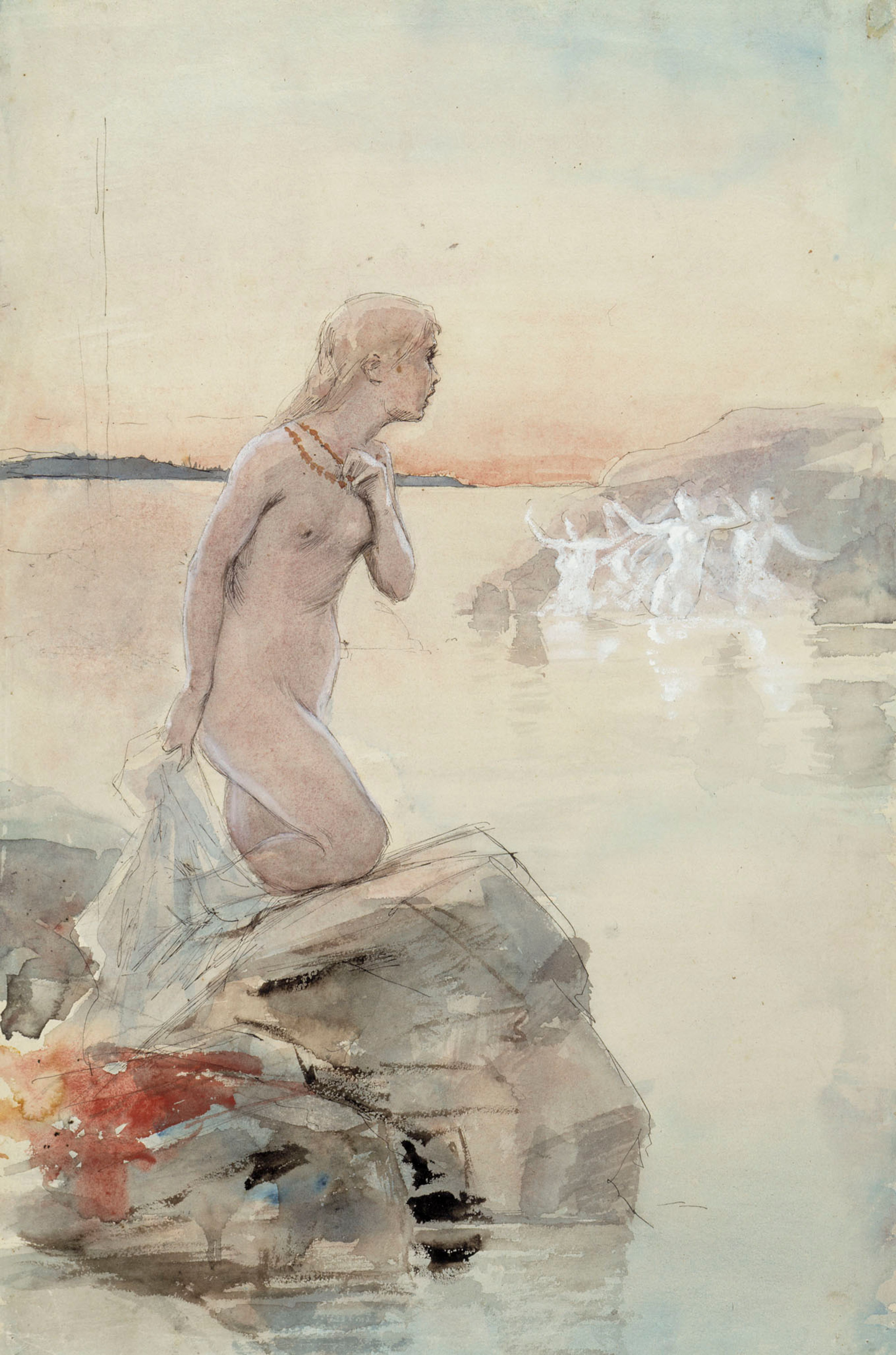
Aino, watercolor by Albert Edelfelt

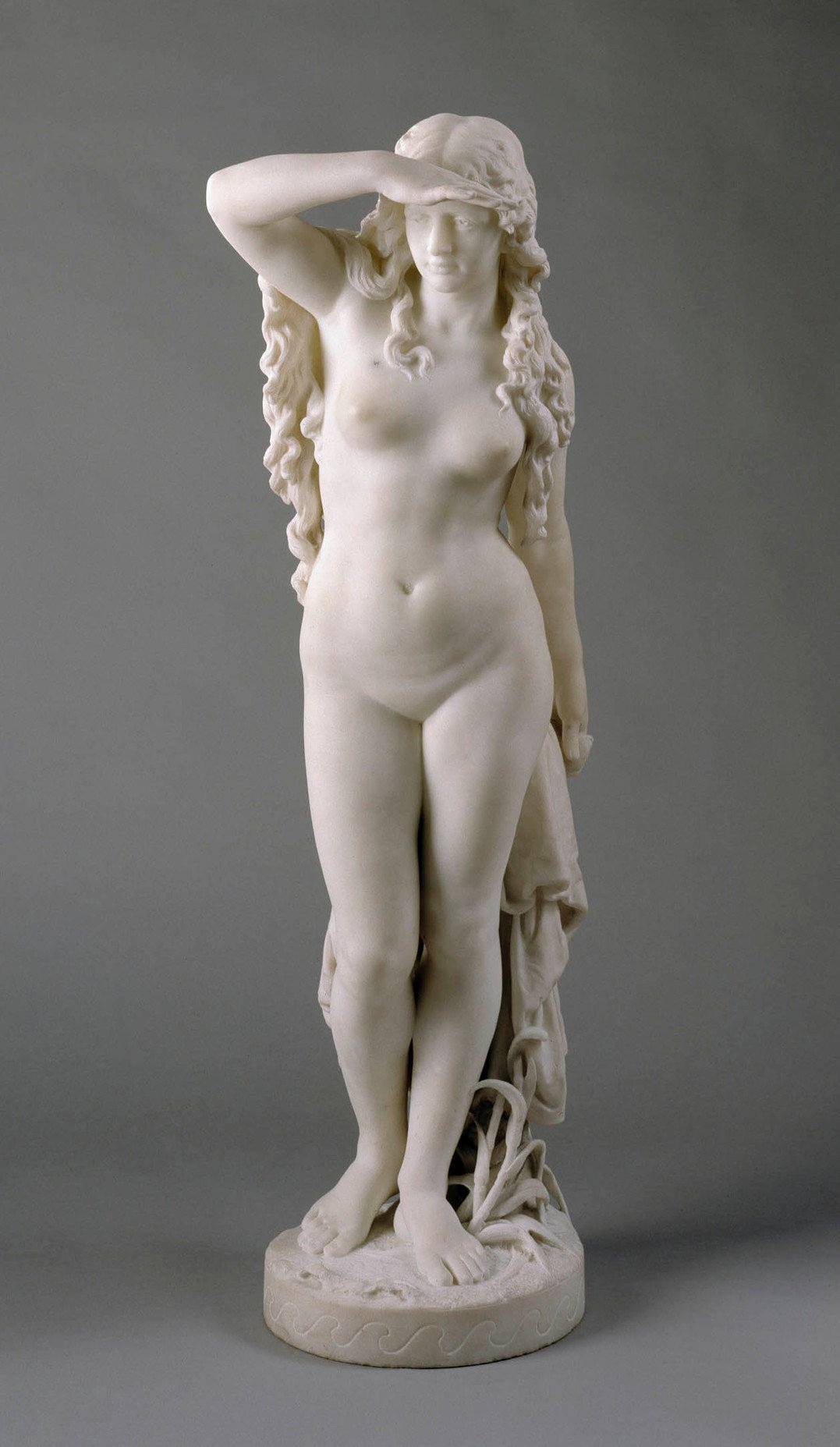
Aino, Looking Out to Sea, Johannes Takanen, 1876

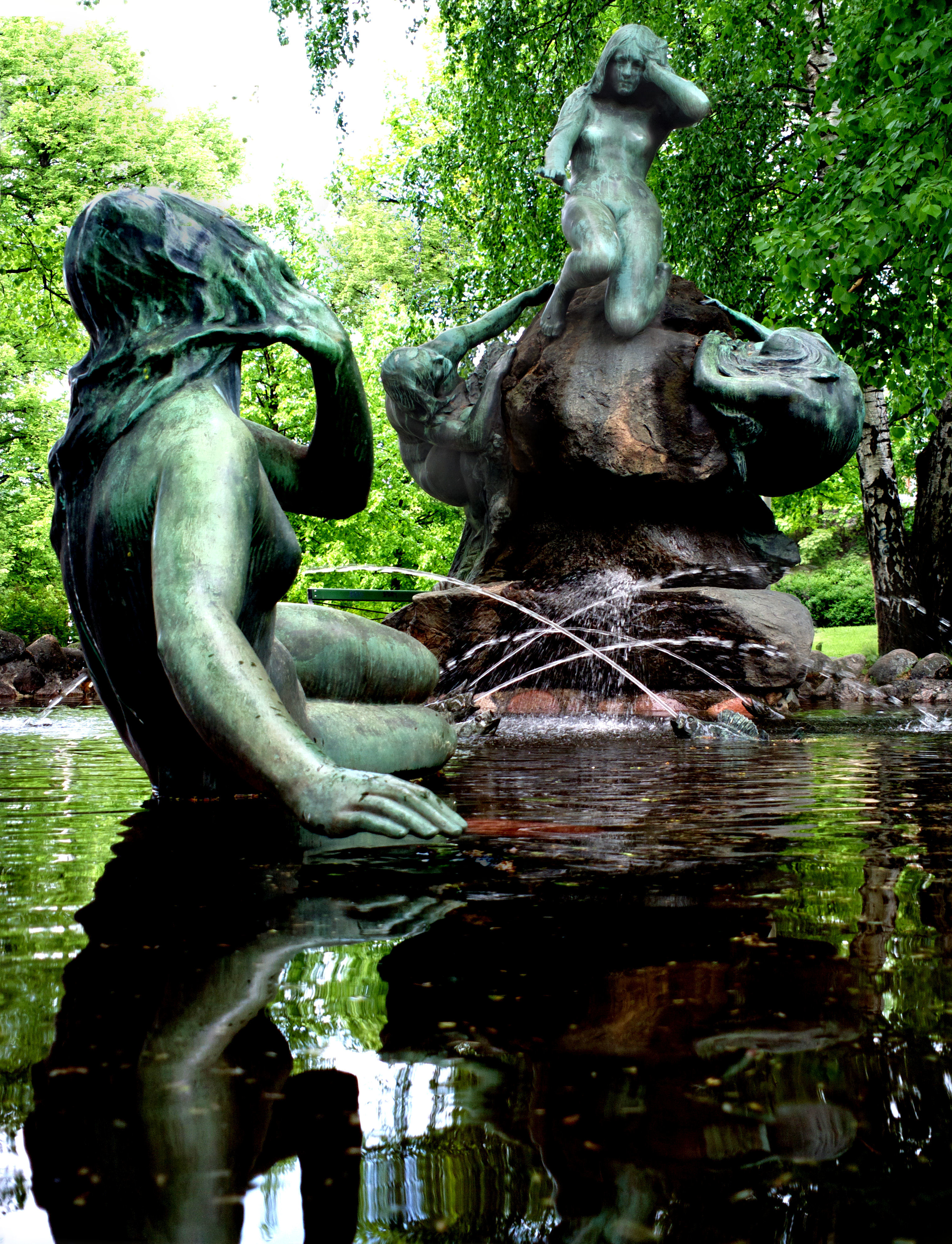
Aino Fountain in Lahti by Emil Wikström, 1912 (fi)

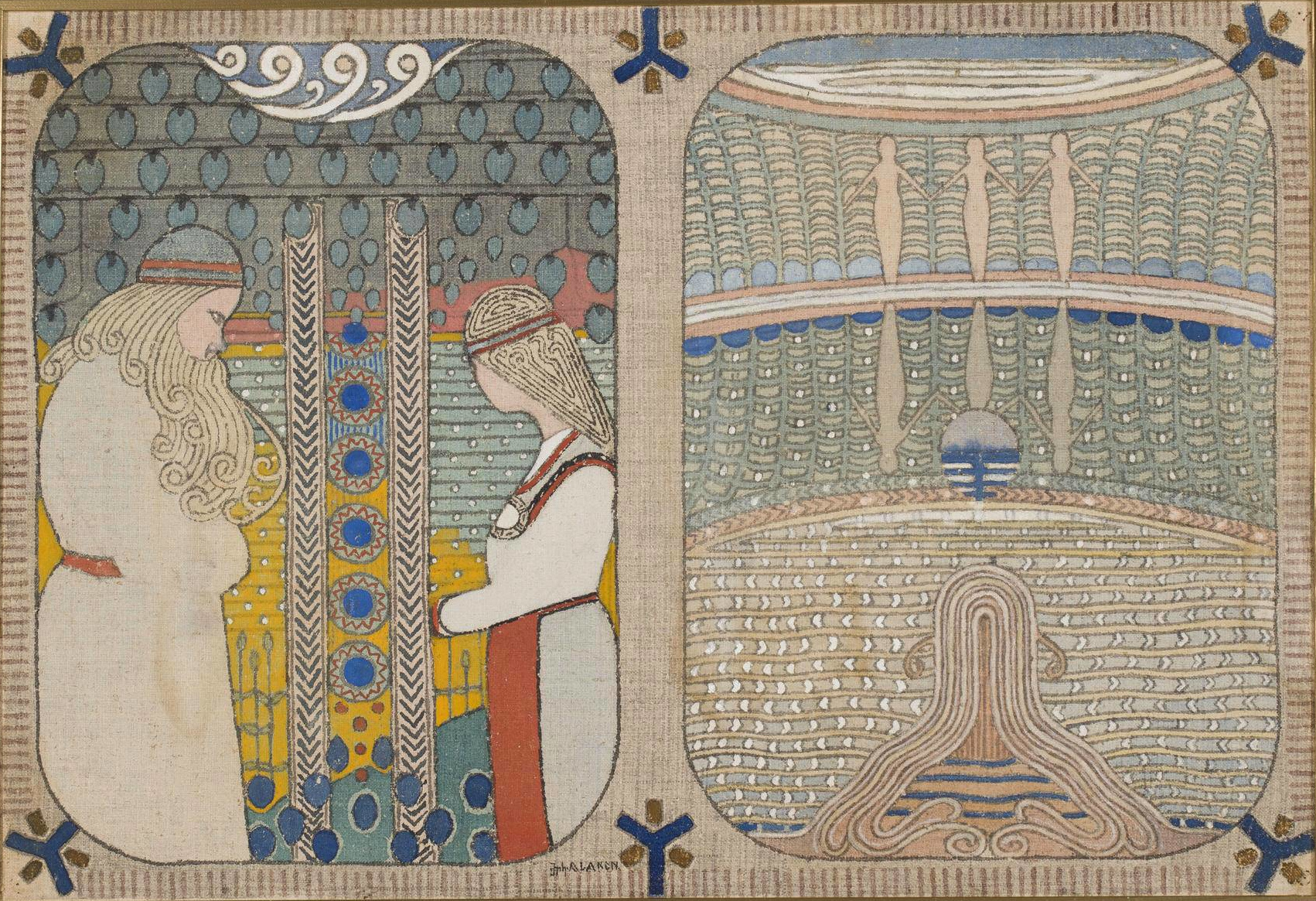
Courting of Aino and Aino Drowns Herself, Joseph Alanen, 1908–1910

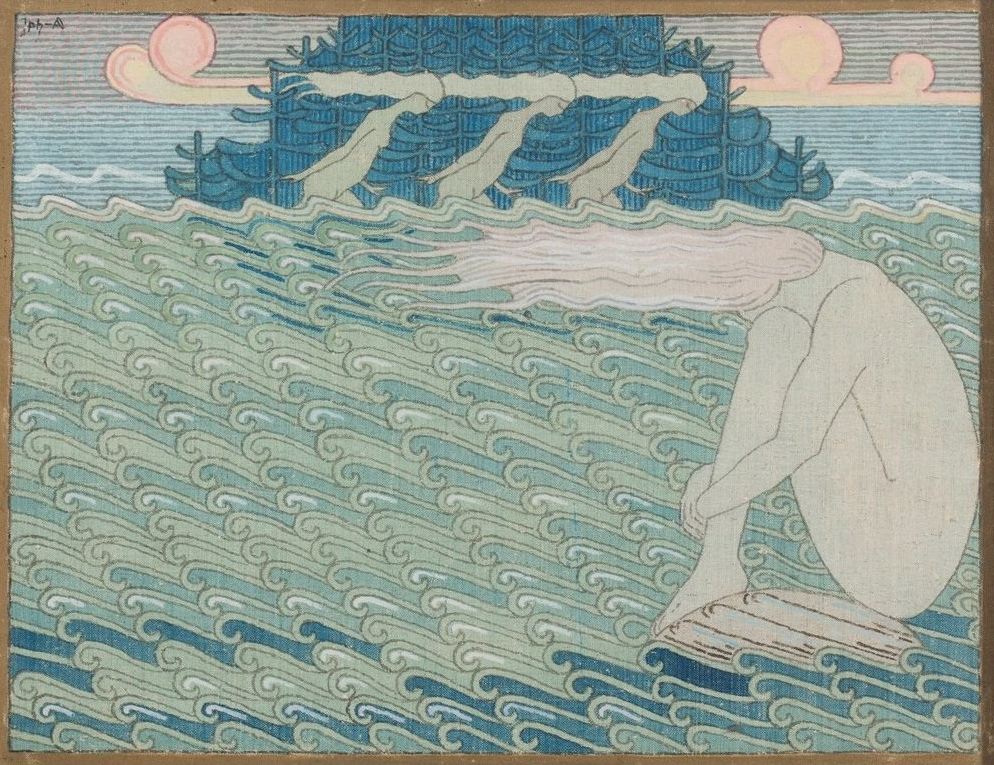
Maidens at the Headlands, Joseph Alanen, 1919–1920

Canto V. – Väinämöinen and the Fish

Väinämöinen hears of Aino's death and laments throughout the days and nights, he prepares his boat and fishing tackle and sets out to the water. He catches a fish and draws it into his boat, he is amazed at the fish as it is unlike any fish he's ever seen before, he prepares to cut the fish and it slips from his fingers.

The fish addresses him disdainfully, telling him that she is Aino in fish form come to be his companion and not to be cut to pieces, she leaves and tells him that he will never see her again. Väinämöinen tries to capture her again, he weaves a net and dredges the water but does not find the Aino-fish.

Väinämöinen laments heavily at his stupidity and rashness, he calls to his long-dead mother, who advises him that he should seek a bride in Pohjola, a worthy bride of fair complexion and bright eyes. (Note: FLS: Viides Runo)

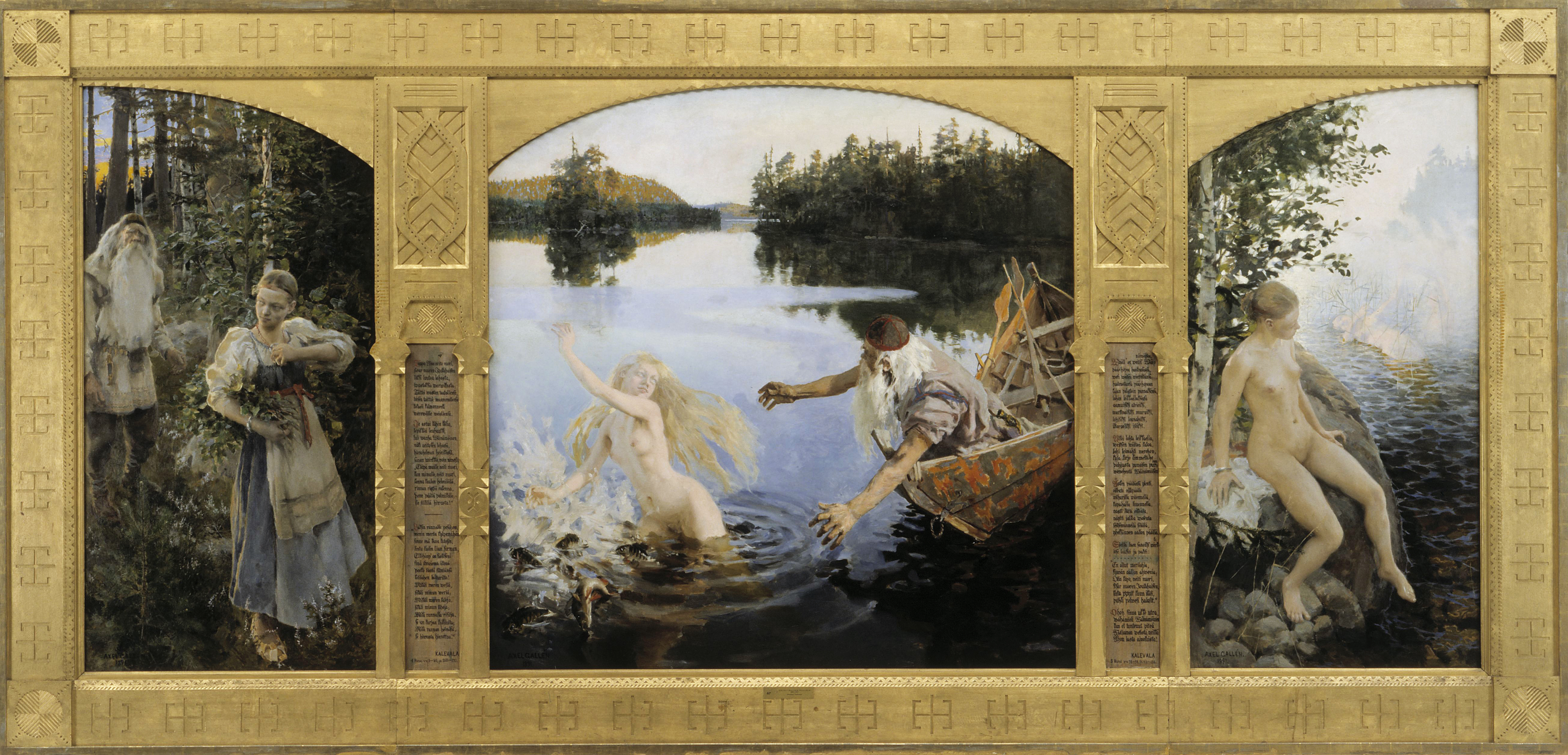
Aino Myth, Triptych, Akseli Gallen-Kallela, 1891, where the middle panel depicts her final appearance to Väinämöinen in fish form (fi)

Canto VI. – Joukahainen's Revenge

Väinämöinen sets out upon his journey to Pohja. Joukahainen however had not forgotten his loss in the singing competition and the loss of his sister and his humiliation, he held a deep rage against Väinämöinen and plotted to kill him, he created a frightening crossbow, its string the hair from the Moose of Hiisi.

Joukahainen waits for Väinämöinen to pass by, he waits for a long time and one day he spies something on the horizon, confusing it for a cloud at first he soon realises it is the ancient wizard himself. He prepares his weapon, his mother asks him for whom he is preparing his mighty crossbow, when he tells her she pleads for him to reconsider, should Väinämöinen die the world will be plunged into sadness and stillness and the magical music will only be heard in the realms of Tuonela.

Joukahainen does not heed his mothers pleas, he prepares his first arrow and shoots high, his second arrow shoots low and the third while not hitting Väinämöinen himself, hits his horse in the chest, plunging Väinämöinen into the rushing waters. (Note: FLS: Kuudes Runo)

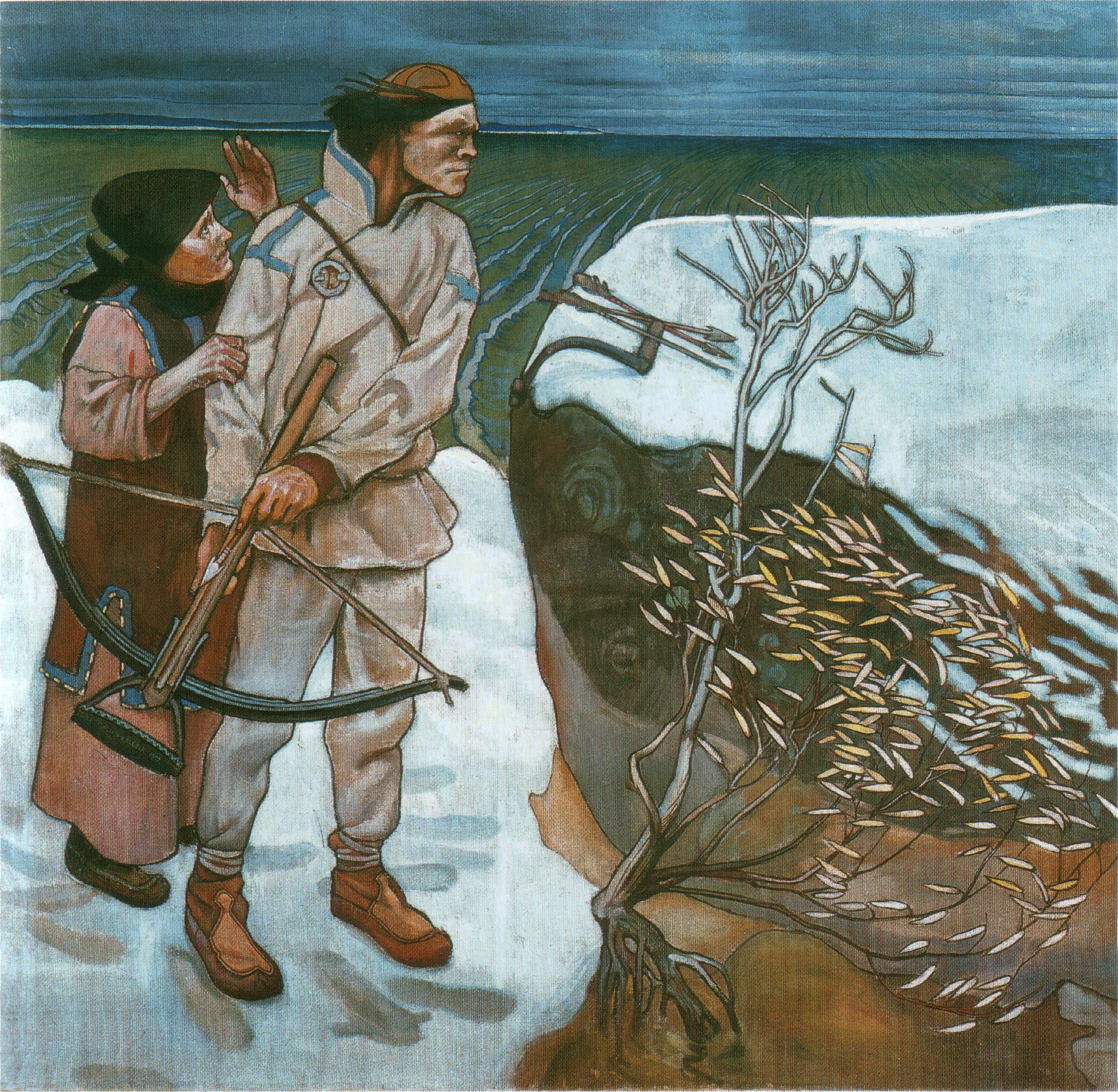
Joukahainen's Revenge, Akseli Gallen-Kallela, 1897 (fi)

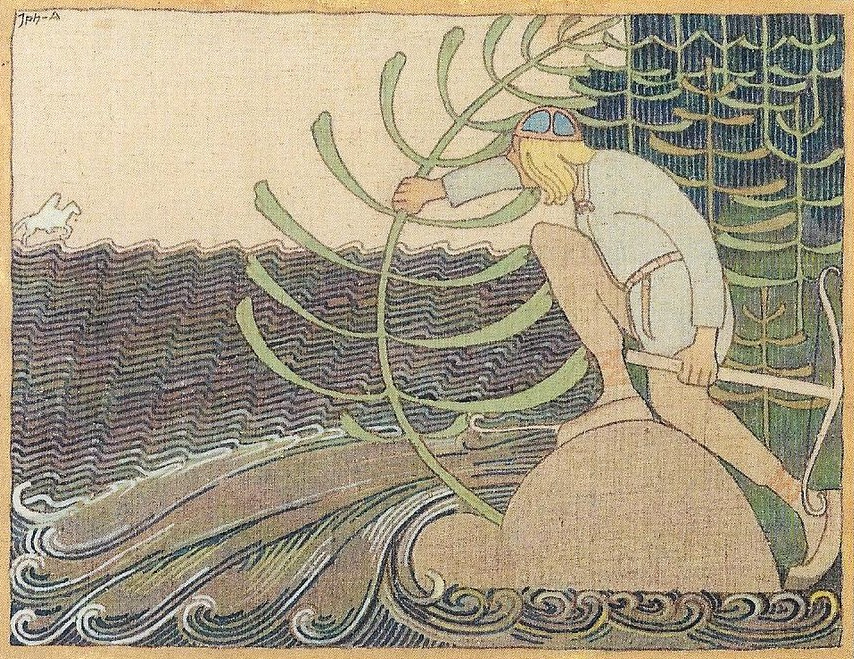
Revenge of Joukahainen, Joseph Alanen, 1919–1920

Canto VII. – Väinämöinen Meets Louhi

Väinämöinen drifts on the roaring sea for eight days, his body beaten and battered. On the eighth day an eagle from Lapland flies overhead and—remembering the great favour Väinämöinen did by leaving the birch tree—lifts him high and carries him to the dry land in Pohjola.

Väinämöinen weeps for three days but a young girl hears his weeping and goes to fetch Louhi, the hostess of Pohjola. She meets with him and questions who he is and where he is from, although she seems to already know. She offers to return him to his homeland in return for him forging the magical mill, Sampo. He informs her that although he cannot do it, he will get the great smith Ilmarinen—the forger of the sky dome itself—to do it.

Louhi promises her eldest and most magnificent maiden daughter to Ilmarinen if he forges a Sampo and she gives Väinämöinen a horse and sledge to get home, but warns him not to look skyward until he is home. Väinämöinen departs Pohjola. (Note: FLS: Seitsemäs Runo)

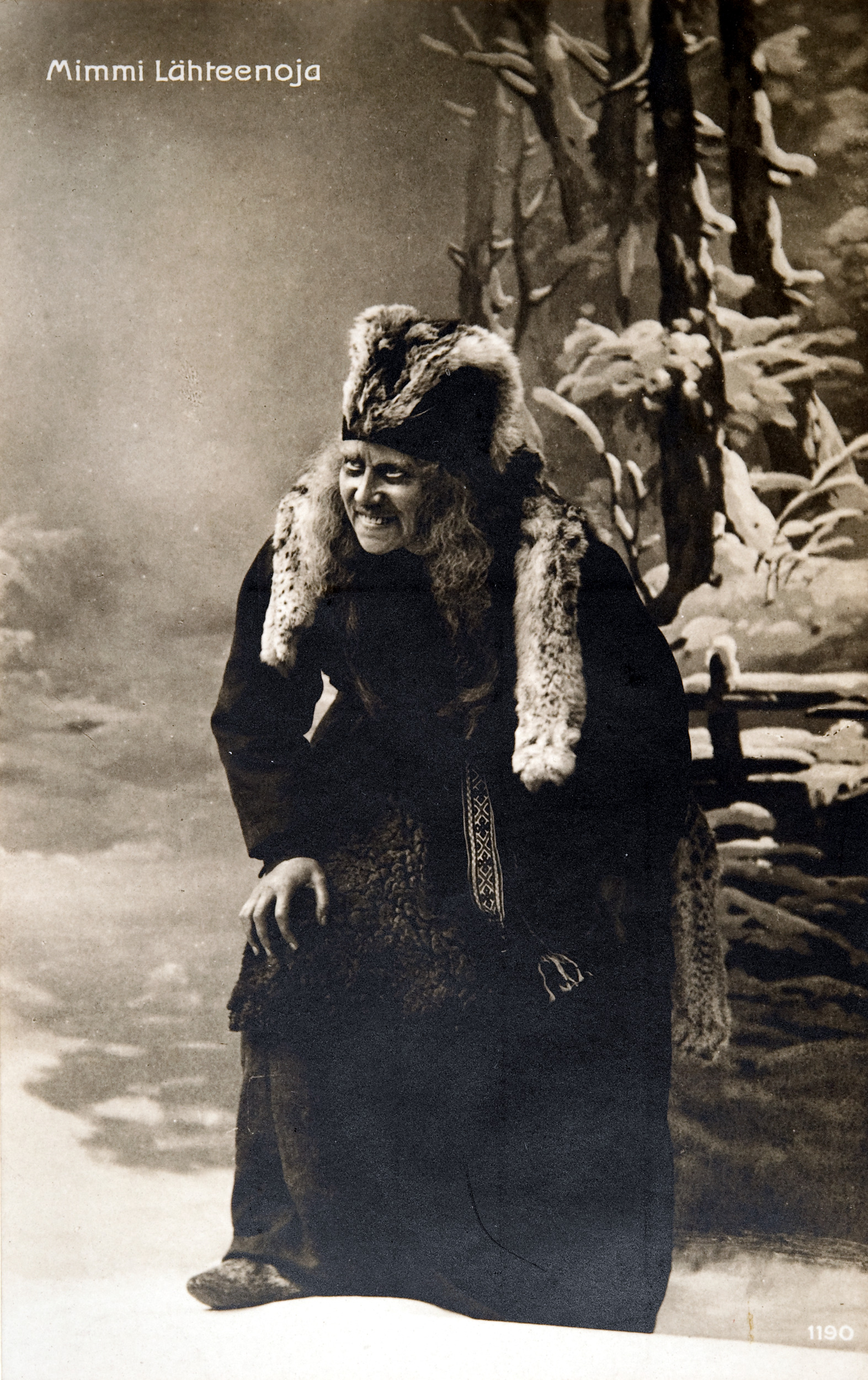
Actress Mimmi Lähteenoja as Louhi in the National Theatre play Pohjolan häät (The Wedding at Pohjola) on the day the theatre opened, April 9 1902

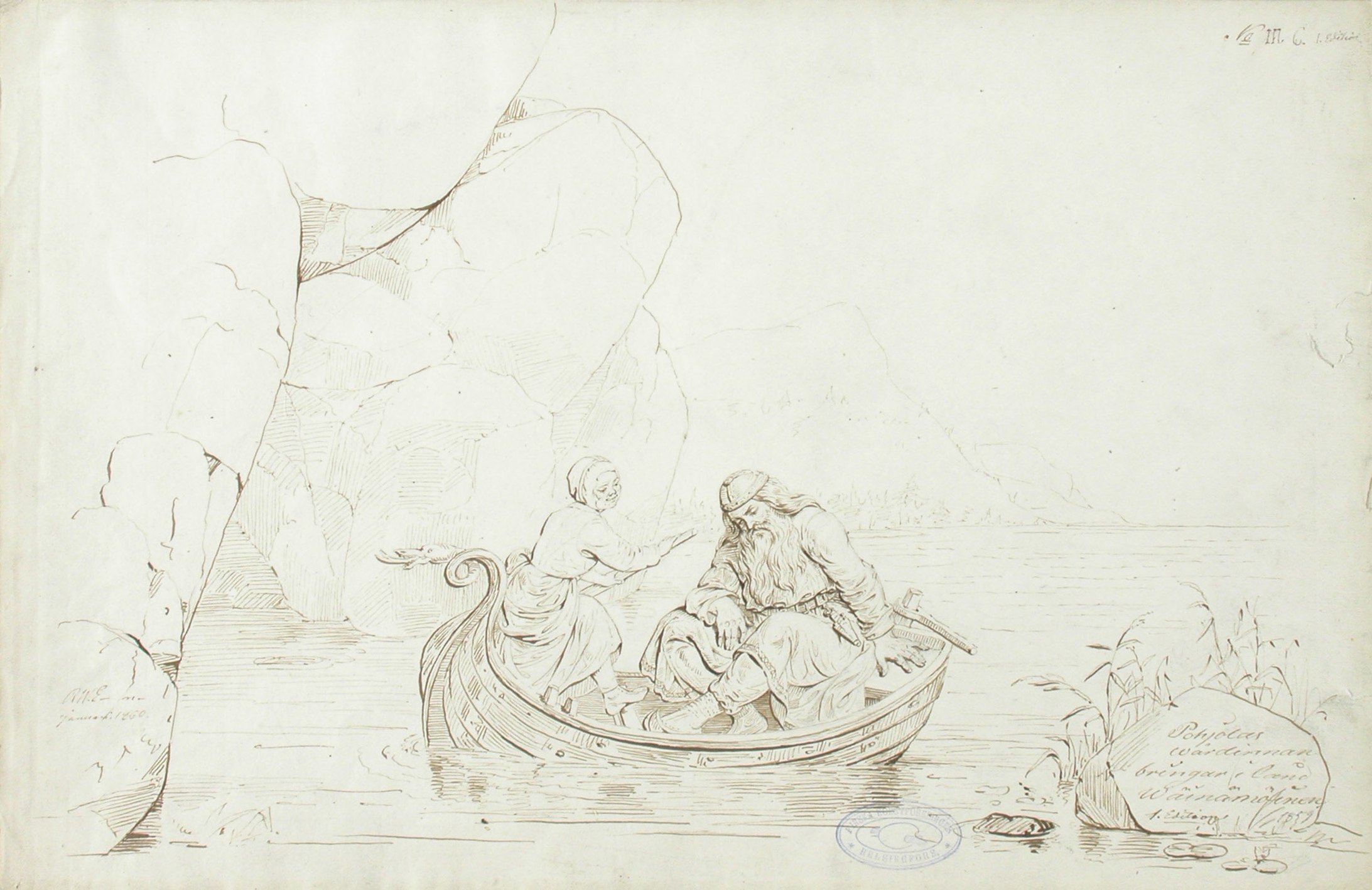
Louhi saves Väinämöinen, Robert Wilhelm Ekman, 1859–1860

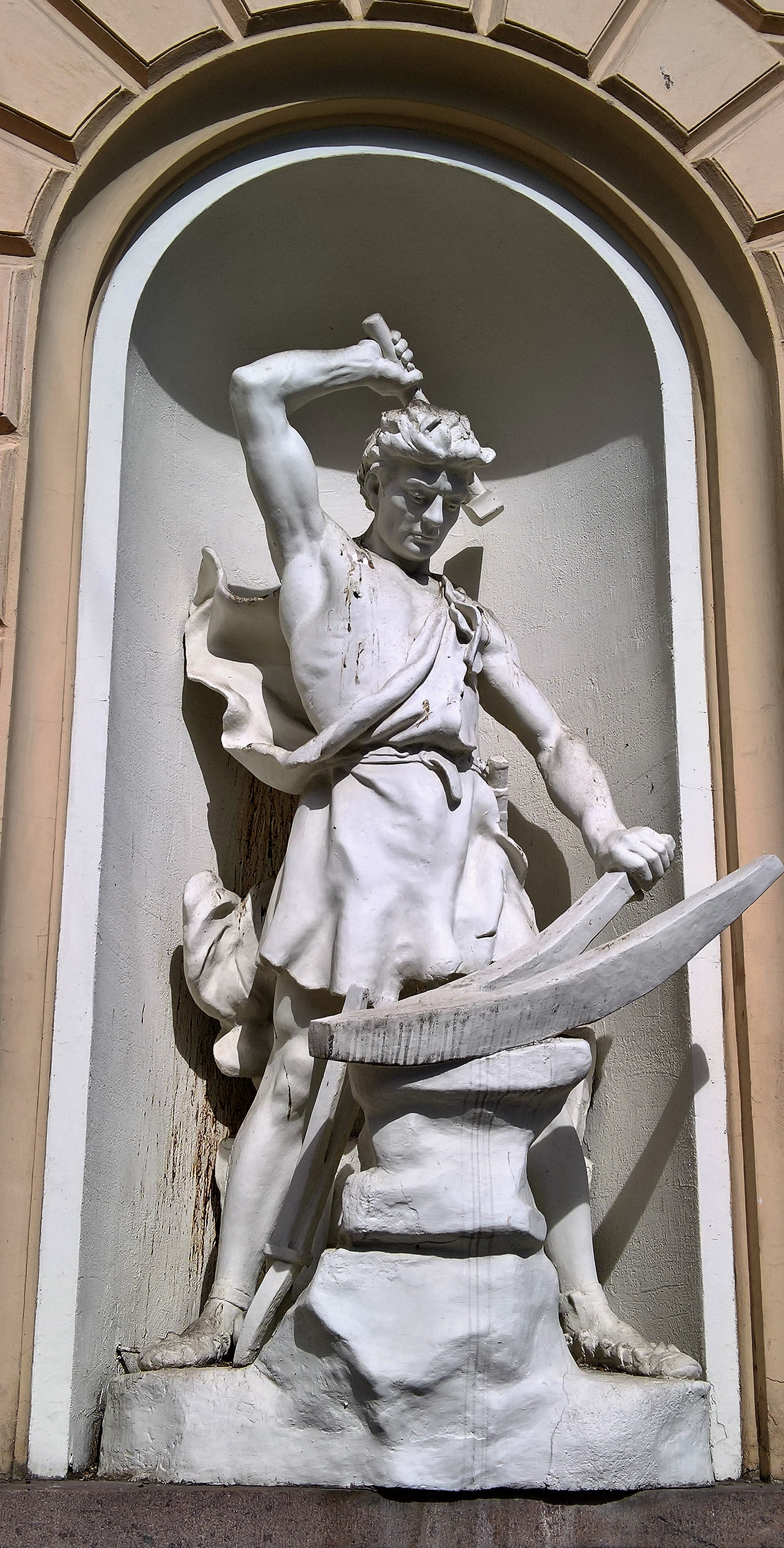
Statue of Ilmarinen by Robert Stigell, 1888

Canto VIII. – Väinämöinen's Wound

Väinämöinen is speeding along on his journey when he hears something curious above his head and against the advice of Louhi he looks up and sees an enormous rainbow with a beauteous maiden at the end of it. He invites her to come to his sledge and be his wife. She acts coy and tells him she will come with him if he succeeds in numerous challenges the final and greatest being the creation and launching of a boat without touching or interfering with it. He works hard on the creation of the boat, for three days, on the third day Hiisi makes Väinämöinen's axe head turn to his knee, cleaving a mighty wound into it.

Väinämöinen tries in vain to quell the bleeding, he rides hard along the road to find someone who can close his wound and stop his blood flowing, however nobody is capable, until he finds an old man in a small dwelling who says he is capable. (Note: FLS: Kahdeksas Runo)

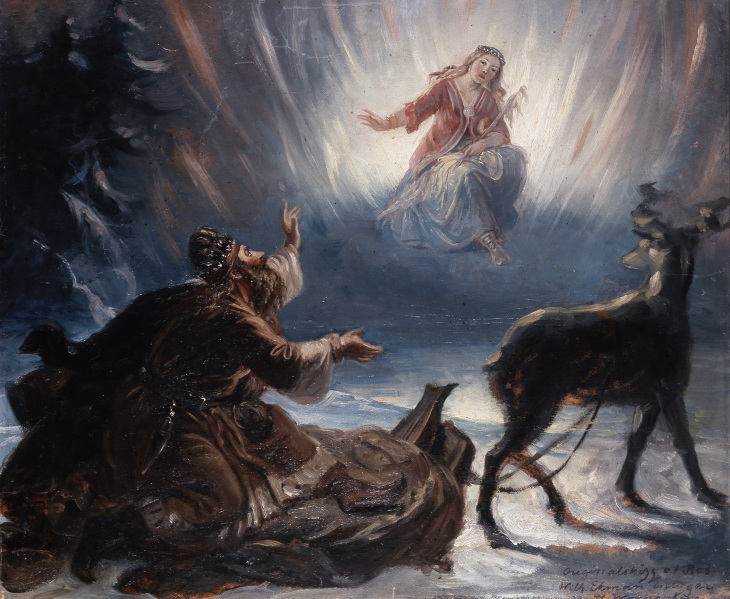
Väinämöinen and Maiden of Pohjola, Robert Wilhelm Ekman, 1861

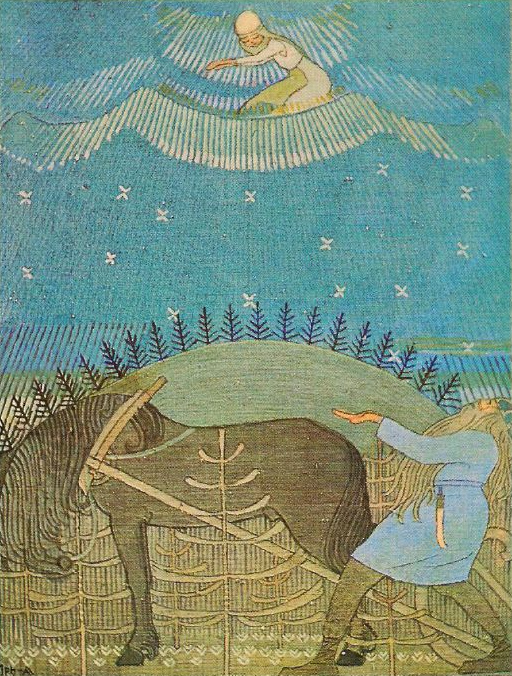
Väinämöinen and Maiden of Pohjola, Joseph Alanen, 1919–1920

Canto IX. – Origin of Iron

The old man greets Väinämöinen and asks him, in amazement of the enormous loss of blood, who he is. He informs Väinämöinen that he can heal him, but he cannot quite remember the origin of iron, if he knew then the wound could be closed and the flow of blood stopped.

Väinämöinen proceeds to tell of the origin of Iron, of the great daughters of creation and the breast milk spilled over the land which created streams of iron throughout the world. He tells of fire and fire's desire to consume iron and of the birth of the ancient smith Ilmarinen. Ilmarinen comforts the iron telling it that it will become beautiful when combined with fire. Väinämöinen tells of Ilmarinen's struggle to find the tempering agent and of the evil Hiisi's poisoning of the iron with venoms and acids causing the iron to grow bitter and evil, and to shout to its relatives to cut and slice flesh and blood in revenge of this poisoning.

Now that the old man knew the origin of iron he could help Väinämöinen. He directs his young son to make an ointment to salve the wound. The boy gathers oak branches, grasses and herbs and boils the ointment for many days. After the ointment is prepared he tests it on an aspen tree and broken stones and then returns to the old man.

The old man applies the ointment to Väinämöinen who struggles and thrashes in suffering, but the old man banishes the pain to the pain hill, he applies silken bandages to the wound. The old man informs Väinämöinen that it is the creator not himself doing the healing. (Note: FLS: Yhdeksäs Runo)

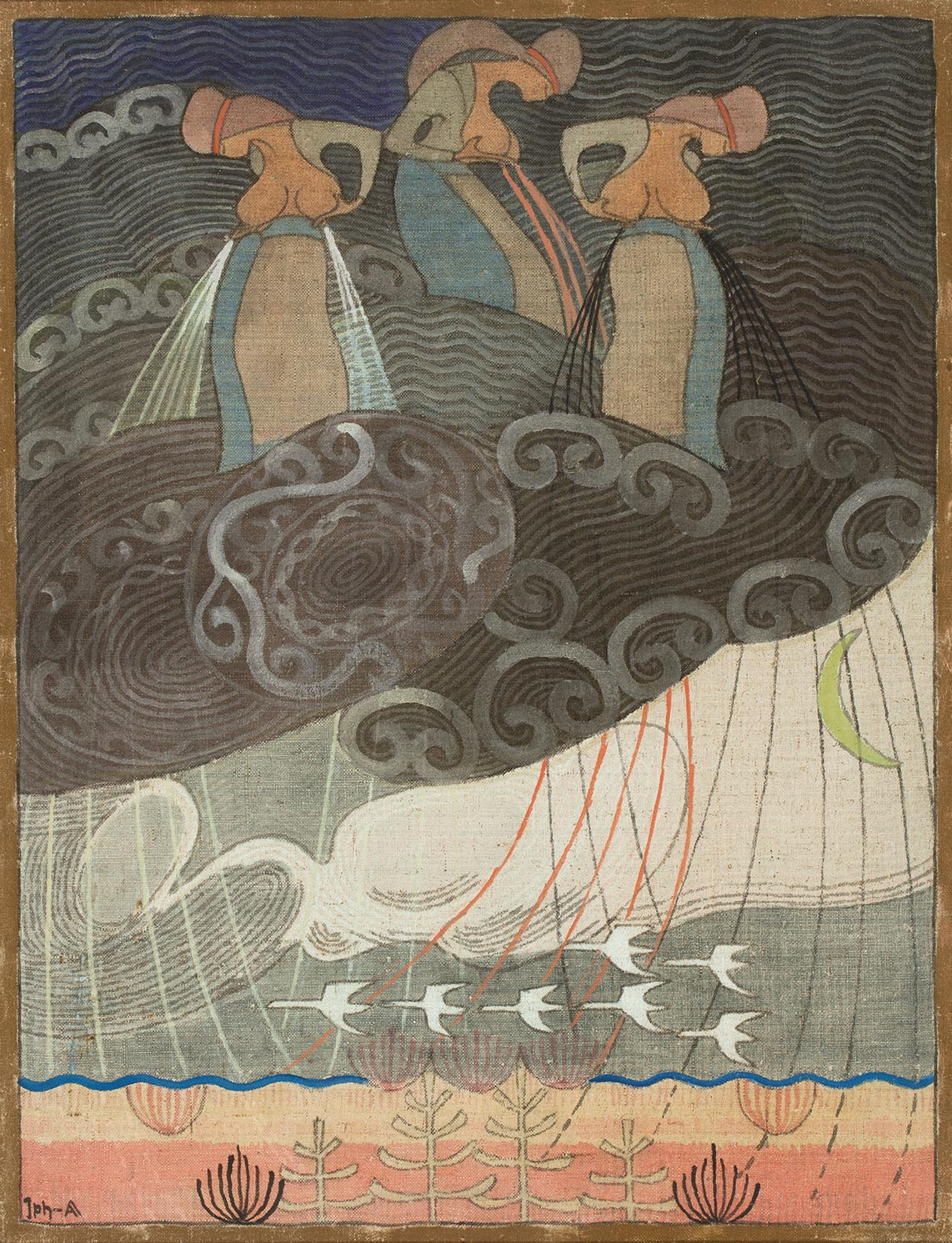
The Birth of Iron, Joseph Alanen, 1910–1912

Canto X. – Ilmarinen Forges the Sampo

Väinämöinen rides away on a horse and after days of riding by the field of Osmo he conjures up a gigantic spruce with golden needles (leaves) and a flower top, and then the Moon to light it by the top and Otava by the branches. He returns home and goes to the forge of Ilmarinen, tells the smith of his ordeal and asks him to go to Pohjola to marry the maiden in exchange for the forging of the Sampo. Ilmarinen says he will never go to the Northland. Väinämöinen instead tells him of the giant spruce in the field of Osmo with all of its wonders, which greatly intrigues Ilmarinen.

Väinämöinen and Ilmarinen both go together to see the giant tree. Ilmarinen climbs it in an attempt to reach the Moon, at which point Väinämöinen sings up a storm that carries Ilmarinen off to Pohjola, over the Moon and under the Sun, by the shoulder of Otava.

Ilmarinen meets Louhi, who asks him if he will forge the Sampo. She brings her daughter dressed in finest garments and jewels and offers her in exchange for the forging of the Sampo. Ilmarinen accepts and begins work on creating his forge.

After the forge is created and the work begins, Ilmarinen works ceaselessly for four days and nights but nothing comes of his efforts but beautiful trinkets. He calls the wind to blow, to work his bellows, a wind blows from all direction, it blew for three days and at the end of the third day Ilmarinen checks his furnace and sees the wonderful Sampo forming, he works it with his hammer and anvil and finally completes the Sampo.

The Sampo grinds all day, it grinds vats of grain, salt and gold one each for eating, for storing and for trading. Louhi grows delighted and takes the Sampo to the mountain of copper and locks it away behind nine heavy locks.

Ilmarinen's task now completed, he goes to the daughter of Louhi and asks her to come with him. She tells him she cannot leave home yet. Ilmarinen becomes downhearted. He is consulted by Louhi who prepares him food and drink then sends him home. (Note: FLS: Kymmenes Runo)

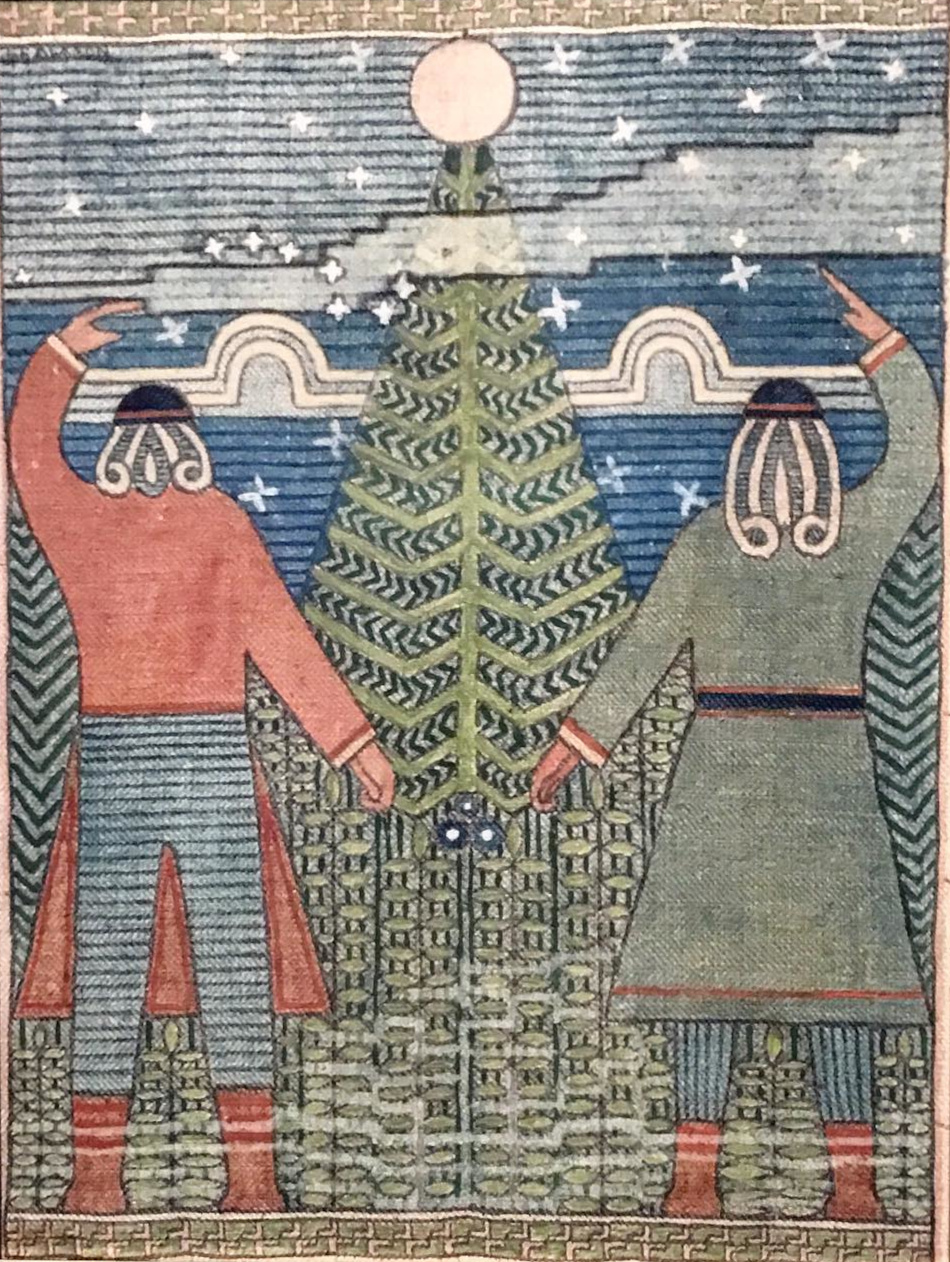
Moonwatchers, Joseph Alanen, 1908–1910

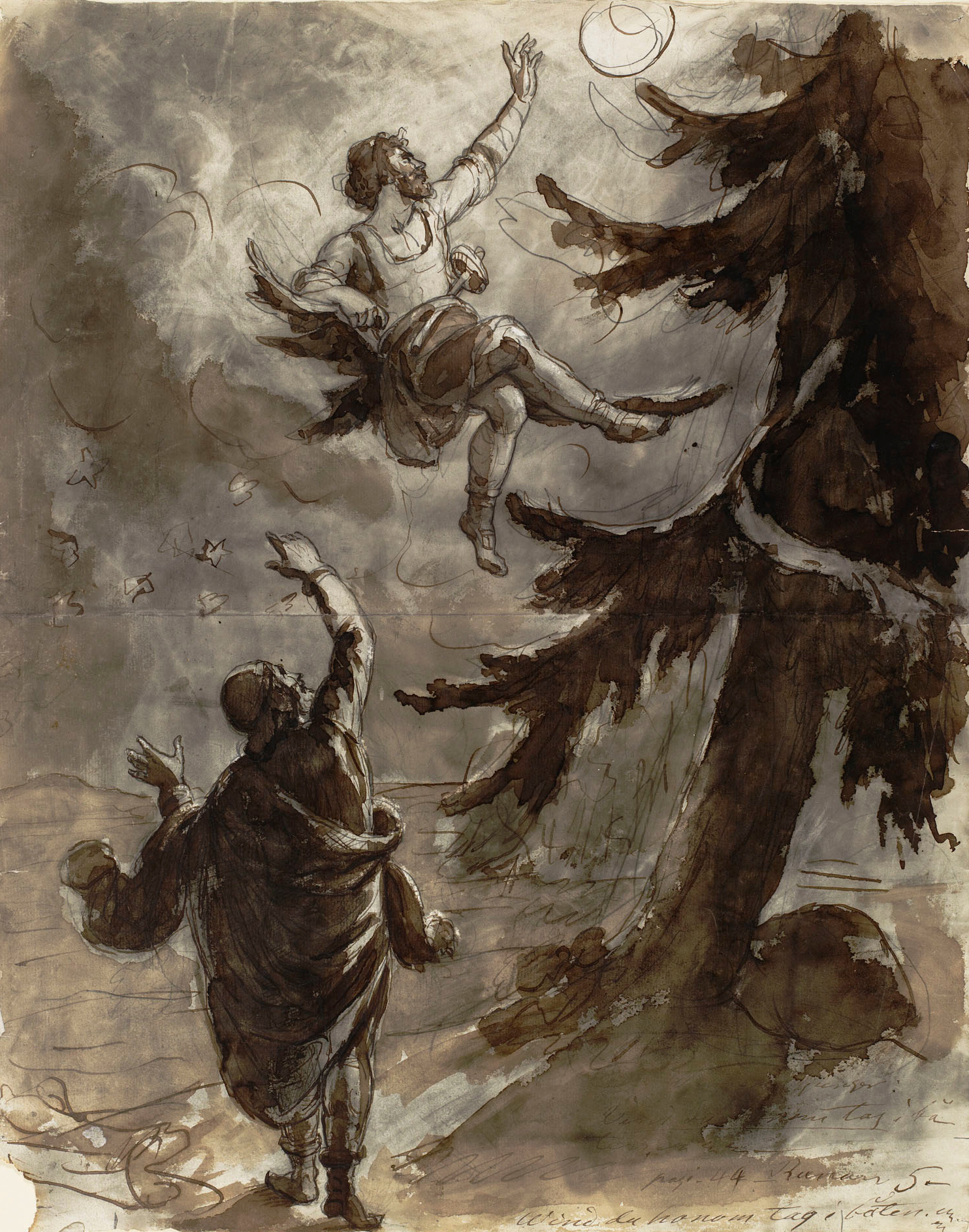
Väinämöinen and Ilmarinen by the Giant Spruce, Robert Wilhelm Ekman

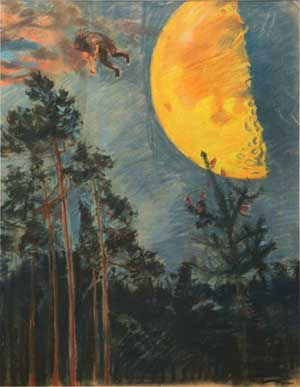
Ilmarinen Flies Over the Moon, Akseli Gallen-Kallela, 1892

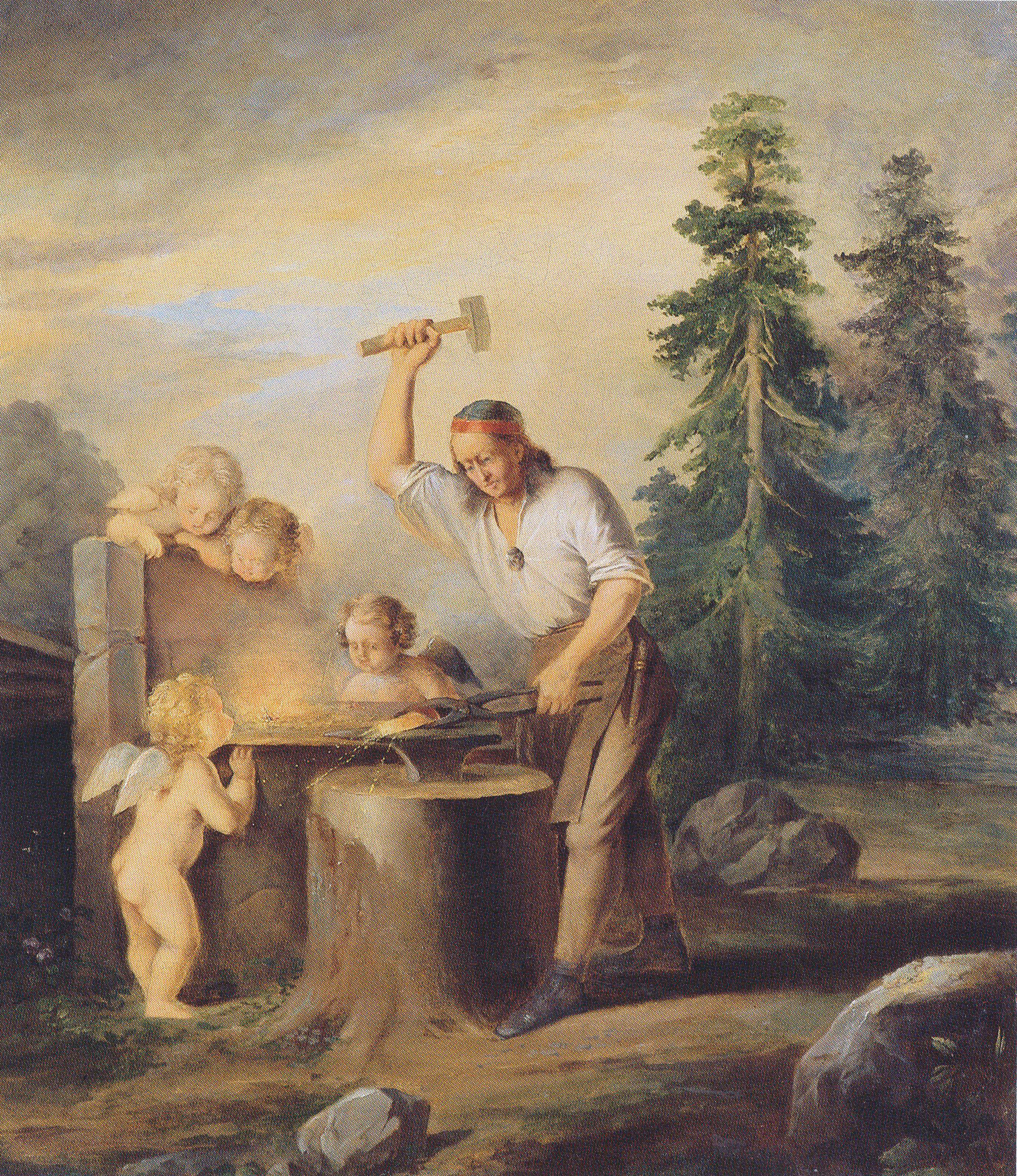
Ilmarinen Forges the Sampo, Berndt Godenhjelm, 19th century

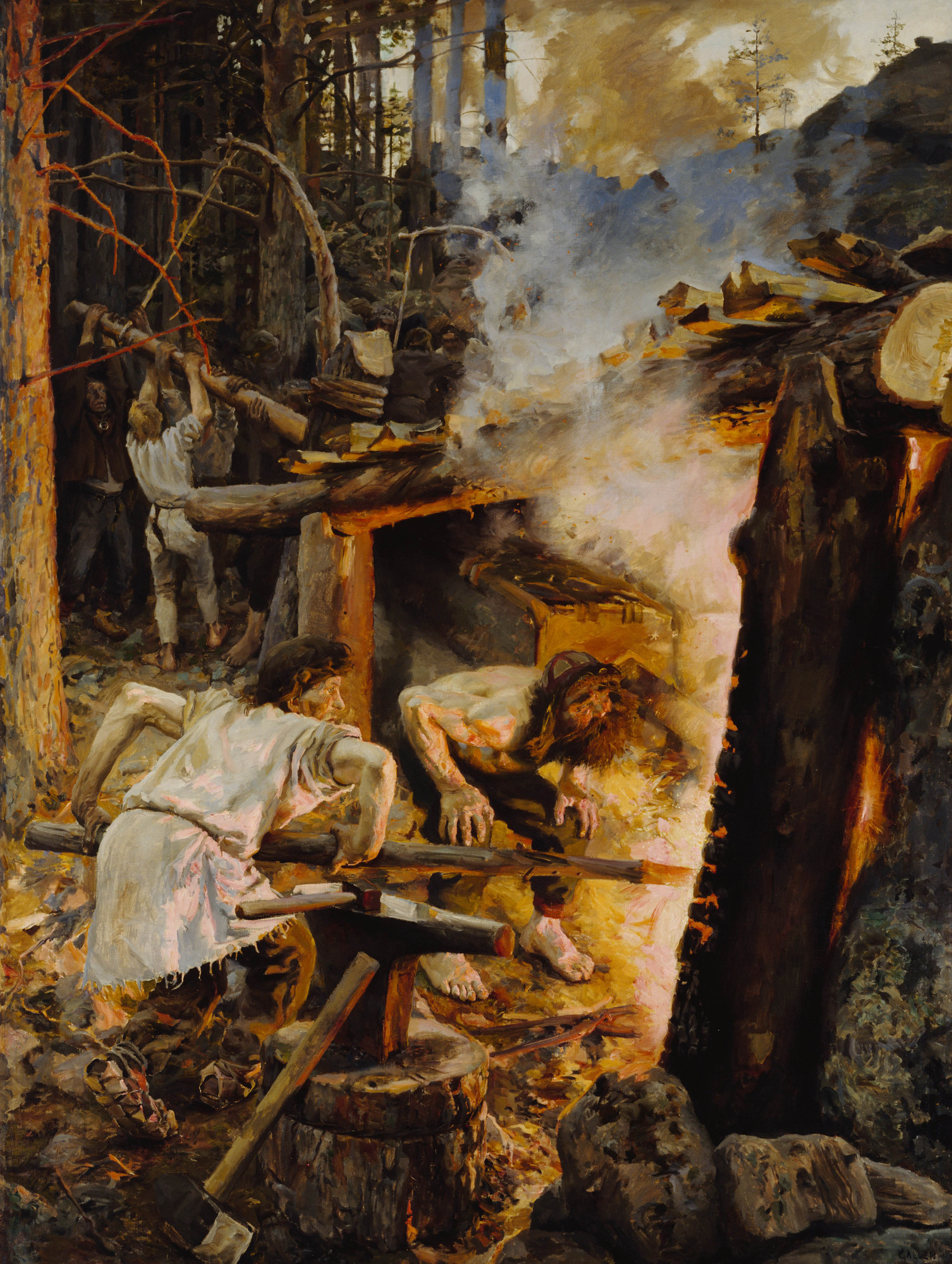
The Forging of the Sampo, Akseli Gallen-Kallela, 1893 (fi)

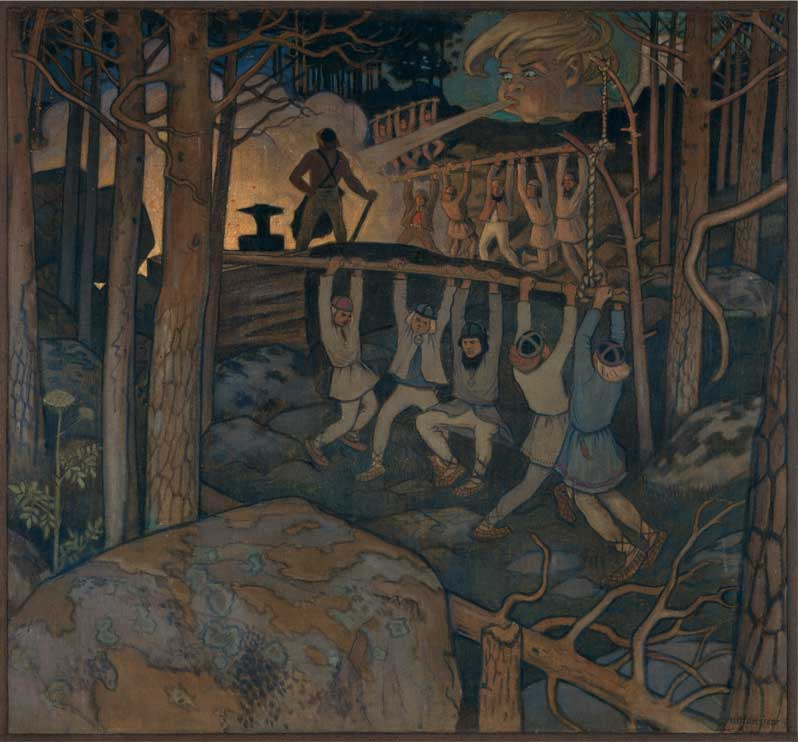
The Forging of the Sampo by Väinö Blomstedt, 1897

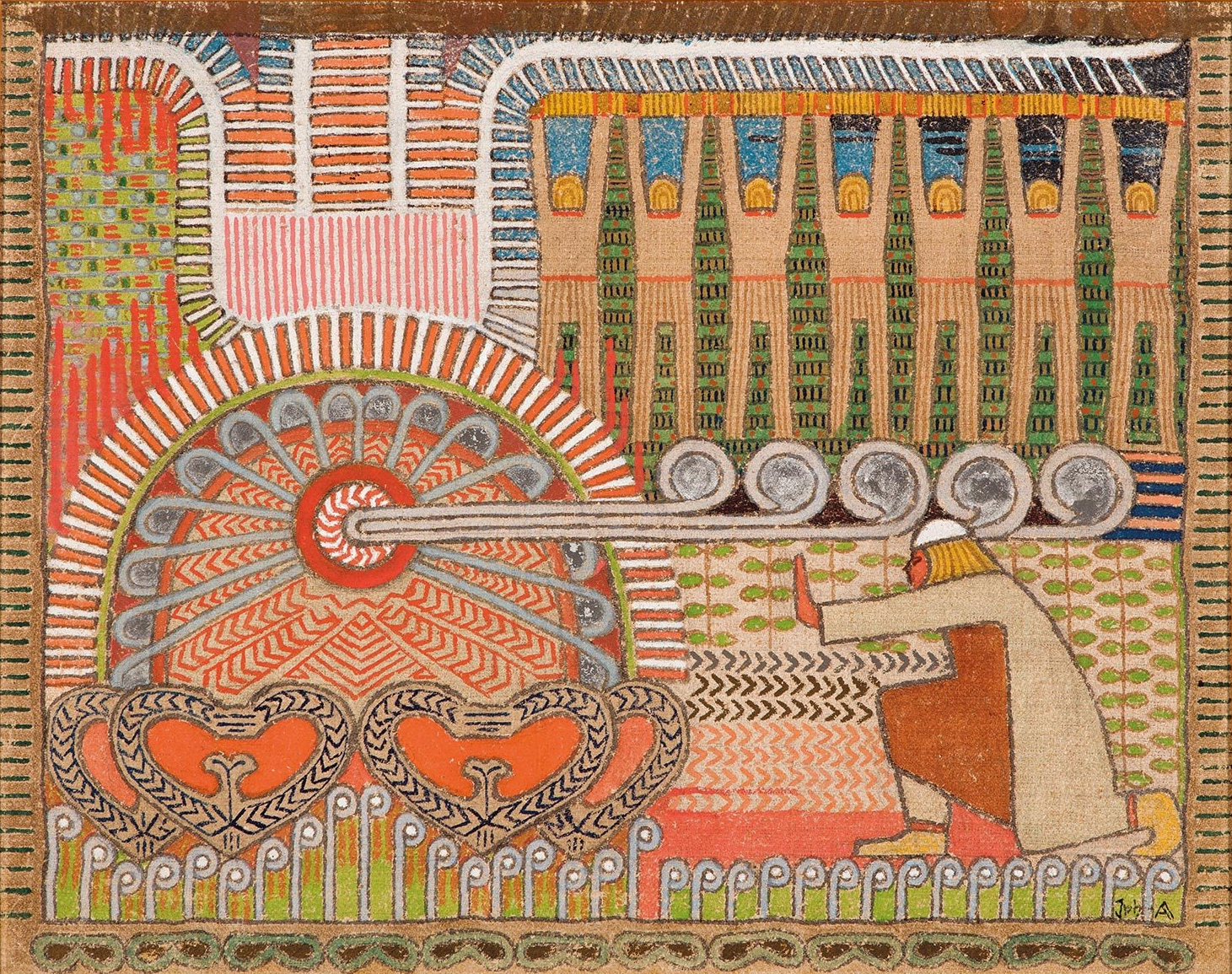
The Forging of the Sampo, tempera by Joseph Alanen, 1910–1911

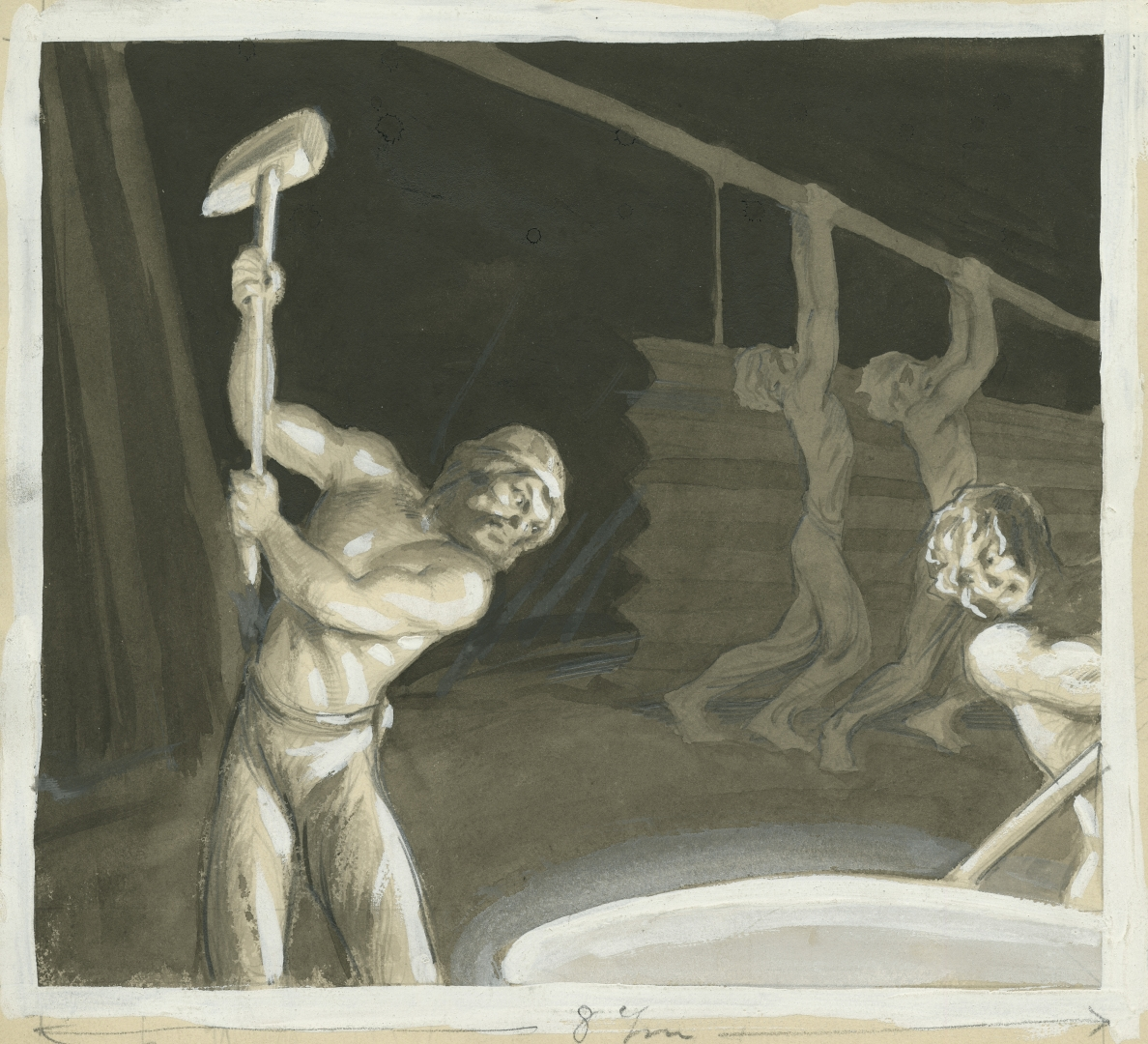
Illustration of the Sampo being forged, by Rudolf Koivu in 1931

== Cantos 11 – 15: First Lemminkäinen Cycle ==
Canto XI. – Lemminkäinen and Kyllikki

Lemminkäinen was a handsome man, ruddy cheeked and tall, but he was a reckless man, fond of maidens and fighting. He desires the Flower of Saari, Kyllikki, the one desired by the sun and moon and stars themselves. The young Lemminkäinen tells his mother about his journey to woo the maiden, his mother tries to dissuade him, she tells him he will be mocked and humiliated but Lemminkäinen does not listen.

Lemminkäinen sets out to the village where Kyllikki resides and as foretold by his mother the men of the village mock him and the women tease him. He takes employment as a herdsman and gains the favour of the maidens of the village; however, he still desires the favours of Kyllikki, she mocks him and refuses his advances. One day the maidens were dancing and rejoicing and at the head was Kyllikki; this is when Lemminkäinen took his chance; he stole the fair Kyllikki away and drove away on her sledge. He shouts to the assembled maidens to never speak a word or he will come back and crush the village and destroy the young men.

Kyllikki protests heavily and tells Lemminkäinen that she has lost her life to a vicious warrior soul. Lemminkäinen then promises to never ride to war again if Kyllikki will promise never to go to the village and dance with the village men; to this she agrees and they return to Lemminkäinen's home. (Note: FLS: Yhdestoista Runo)

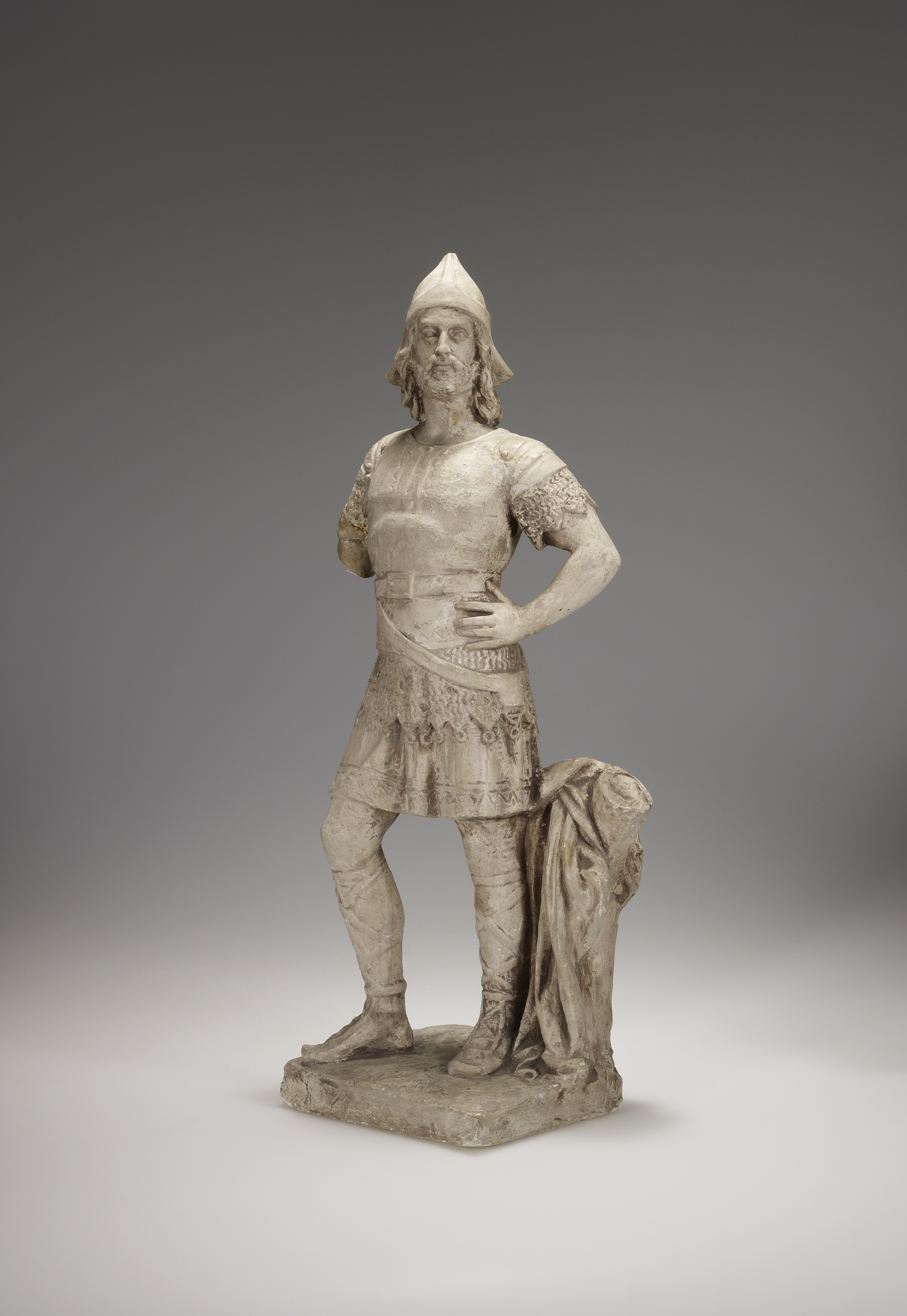
Lemminkäinen by Carl Eneas Sjöstrand, 1872

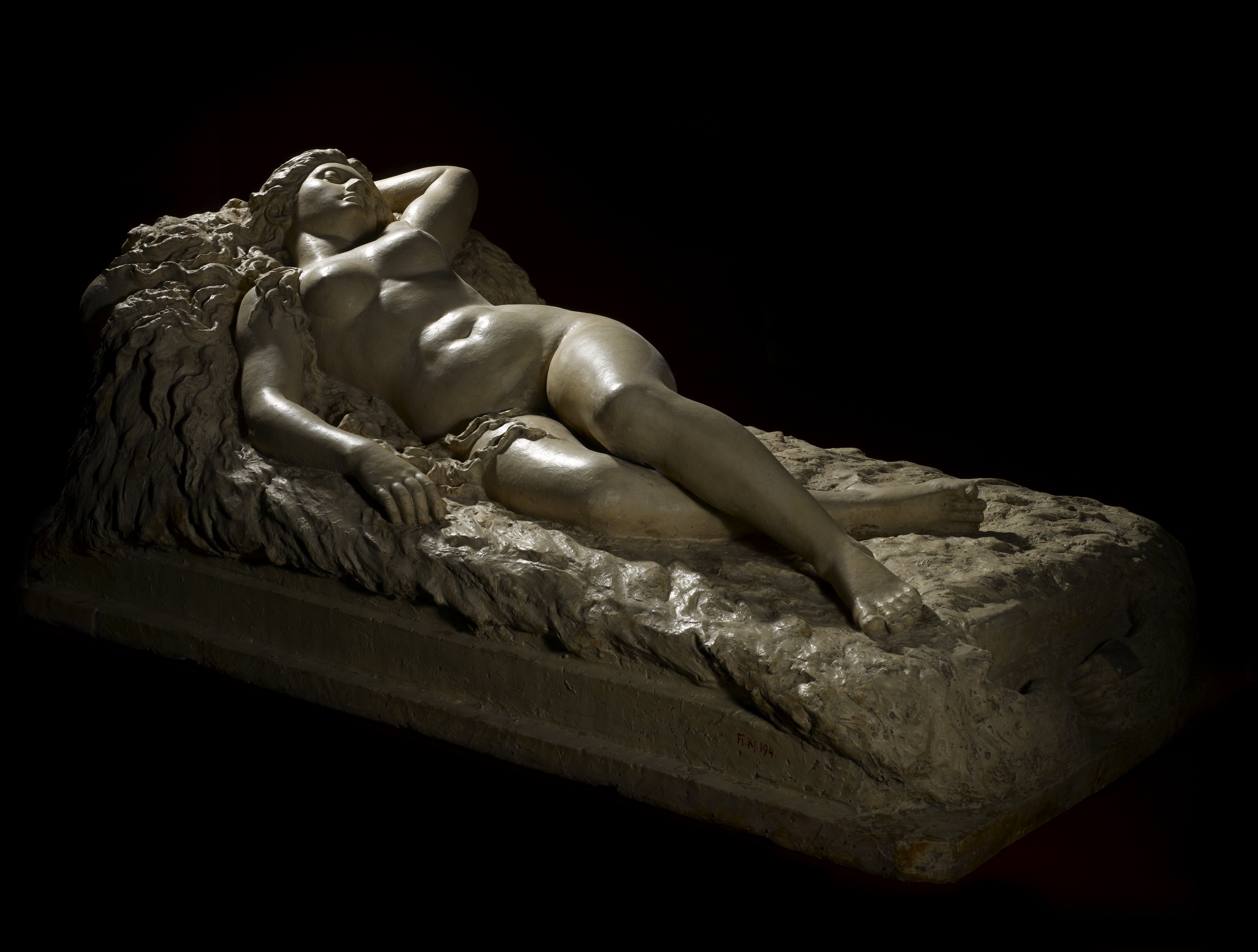
Kyllikki by Sjöstrand, 1883

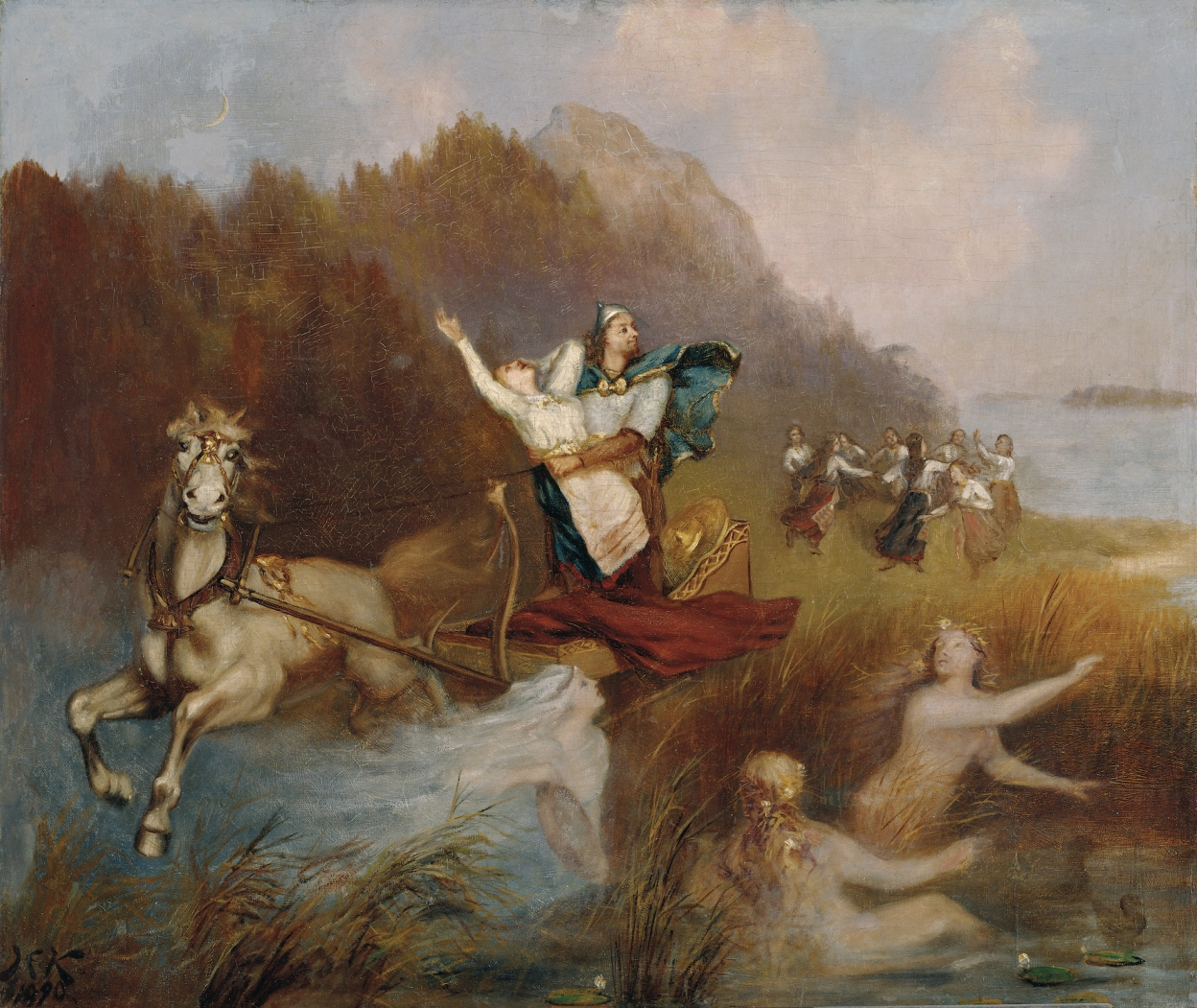
Abduction of Kyllikki, Johan Kortman, 1890

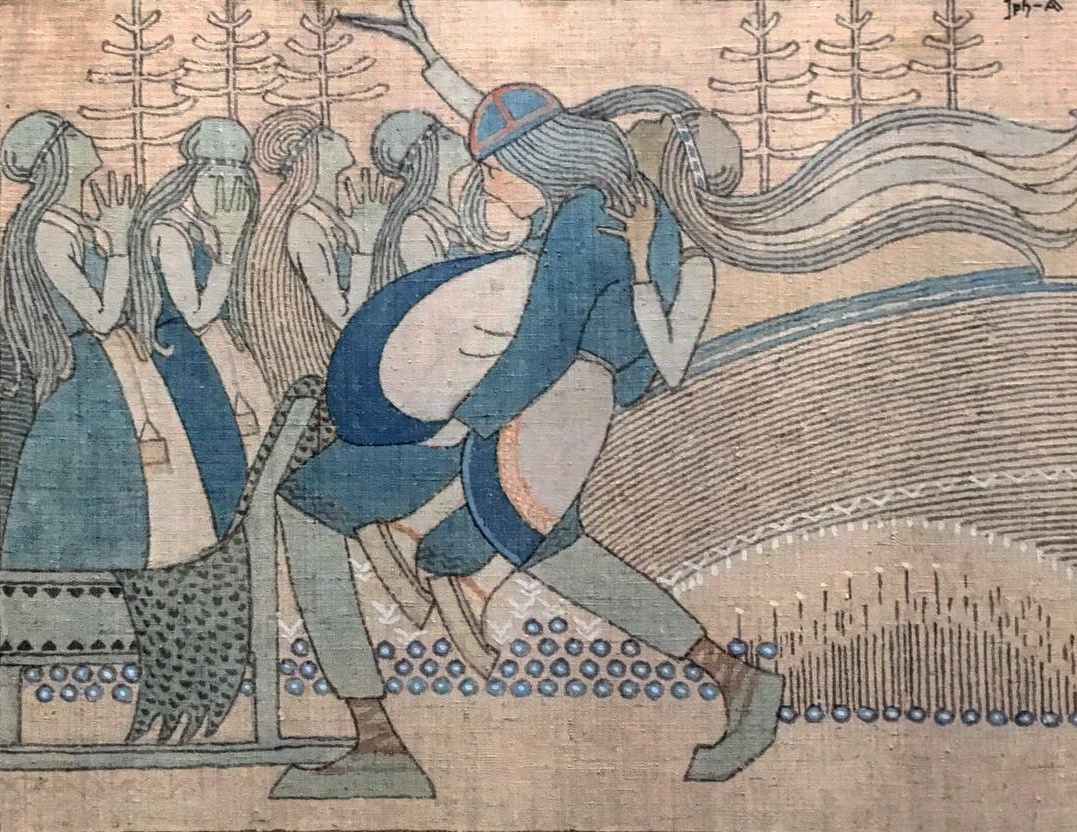
Abduction of Kyllikki, Joseph Alanen, 1916–1917

Canto XII. – Lemminkäinen Departs

Lemminkäinen and Kyllikki lived happily for a while until one day Lemminkäinen did not return from fishing as soon as he should. Kyllikki, growing bored decided to visit the village and dance with the men of the village. Ainikki, Lemminkäinen's sister spies Kyllikki and informs young Lemminkäinen of his gadabout wife.

Lemminkäinen is furious, he decides to leave for Pohjola, to win the maiden of the north's heart, he prepares for battle. His mother and Kyllikki try and dissuade him, they tell him of the dangers that face him and of the happiness he has at home, but he does not listen, his mother warns him he will be enchanted and killed but he does not listen. Lemminkäinen throws his hair brush down and warns his mother to look out for it because when blood flows from it he has met with his doom.

Lemminkäinen leaves his happy home and the love of his mother and his beautiful wife and sets out for battle. He rides for days and finally approaches his destination, he casts a spell to Hiisi to silence the dogs of Pohjola and proceeds to enchant all the men of Pohjola out of the homestead, he only neglects to enchant one wretched cowherd called Märkähattu ("Soppy Hat") as he feels it would be a waste of his efforts. (Note: FLS: Kahdestoista Runo)

Canto XIII. – Moose of Hiisi

Lemminkäinen, full of bravado, seeks the mistress of Pohjola, Louhi, and demands her daughter. Louhi tells him that in order to woo her daughters he must first prove his worth by hunting the moose of Hiisi on skis. Lemminkäinen accepts and prepares for the hunt. He quickly makes his way to the workshop of Lyylikki, the famous ski maker, and asks her to make the finest skis for his task.

Lemminkäinen then sets out on his journey. He chases the moose wherever it goes, and he catches it and pens it on a pen of oak, but the moose grows angry and breaks free. Lemminkäinen makes chase once more, but he breaks his left ski in a hole and the right against the ground and loses the moose. He laments his hubris and arrogance and vows never to chase the moose of Hiisi on skis again for it will only lead to the loss of good skis and fine poles. (Note: FLS: Kolmastoista Runo)

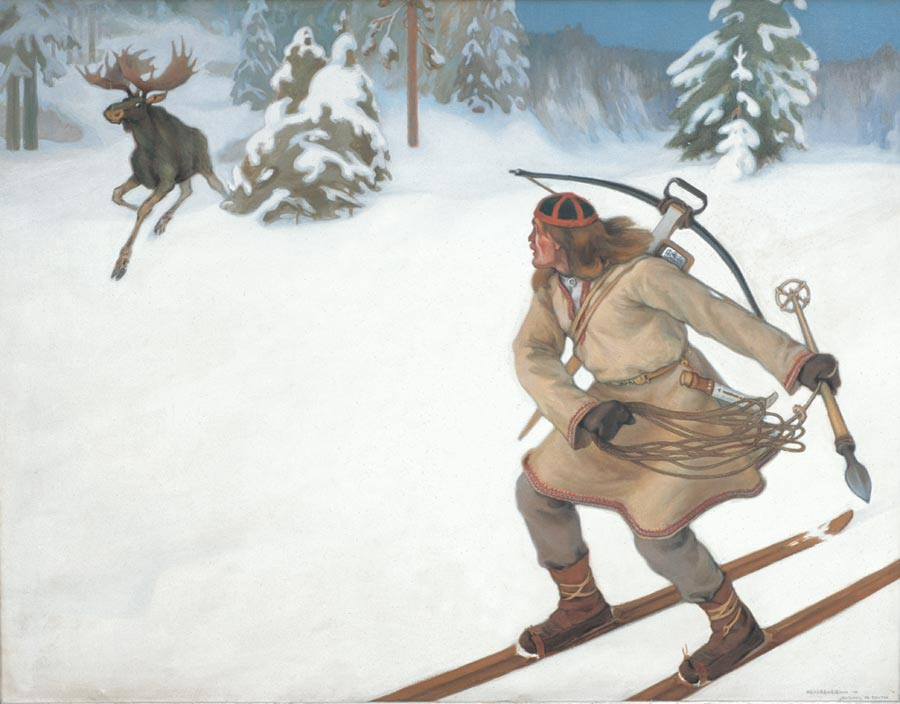
The Ski Hunt of the Moose of Hiisi, Väinö Hämäläinen, 1902

Canto XIV. – Lemminkäinen's Trials and Death

Lemminkäinen thinks about his options; he chooses to continue the hunt. He calls to the great god Ukko and to Tapio and his household, and with their guidance and support he finally captures the moose of Hiisi and returns it to Pohjola.

Louhi receives the moose, but further tasks Lemminkäinen with capturing and bridling the horse of Hiisi. Lemminkäinen takes a golden bridle and silver halter and leaves to find it. He searches for three days and on the third day finds the grand courser on the sand with a fiery mane and smoking nostrils. Lemminkäinen prays to Ukko, and hail falls down on the back of the horse allowing him to bridle, mount and return it to Louhi.

I have reigned the mighty courser, brought the foal of Hiisi bridled. Louhi tasks Lemminkäinen again: this time he has to shoot a swan from the black river of Tuonela. Lemminkäinen sets off, crossbow in hand to complete this latest task. He reaches the river of Tuoni, but little did he know that the snubbed herdsman, Märkähattu, was waiting for his return. Märkähattu conjures up a sea serpent, which tears through Lemminkäinen's body. Lemminkäinen falls to the ground and dies. Märkähattu approaches the body and pushes it into the river, where further downstream it is cut into pieces by the son of Tuoni. (Note: FLS: Neljästoista Runo)

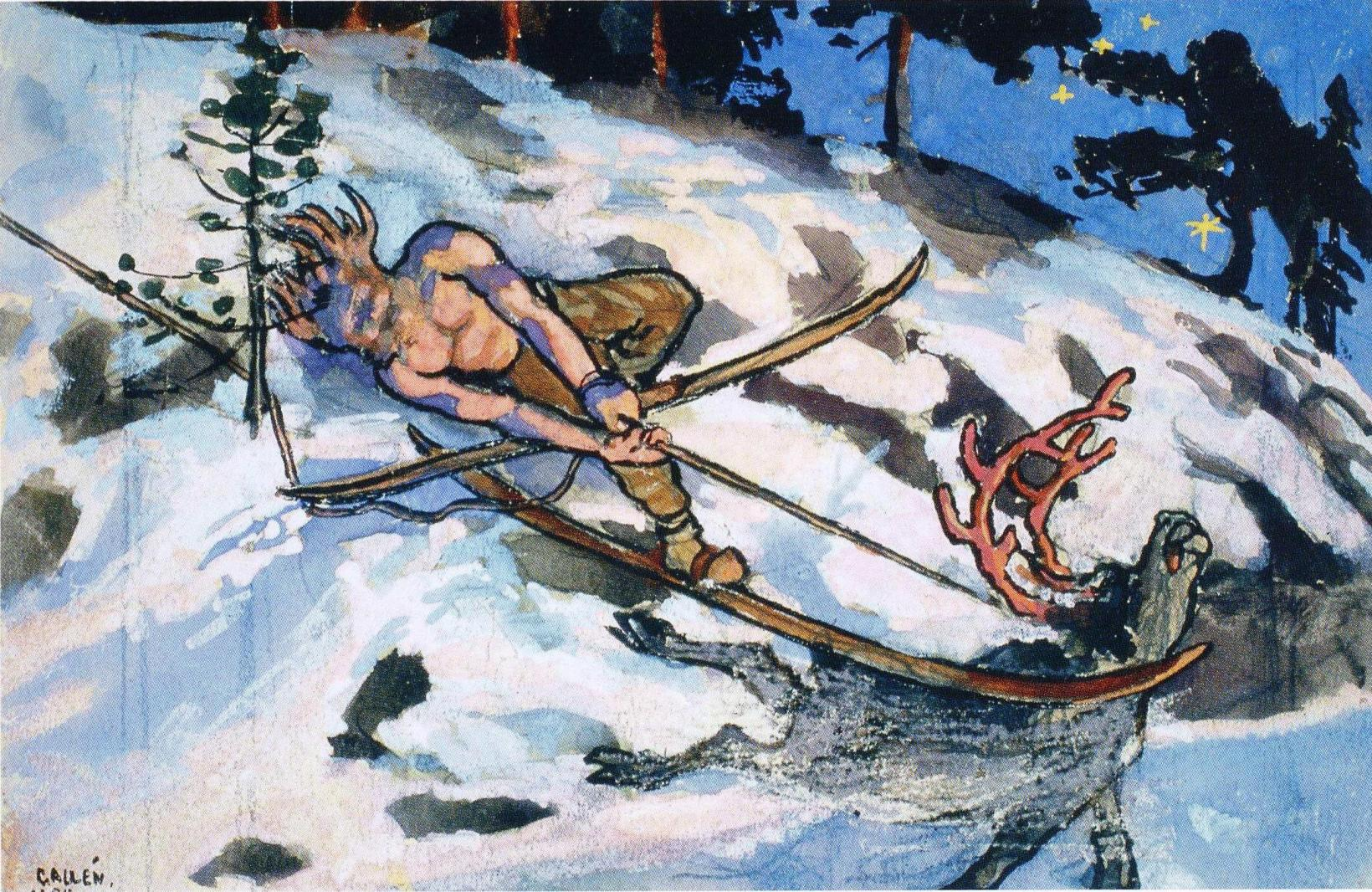
The Chase of the Moose of Hiisi, Akseli Gallen-Kallela, 1894

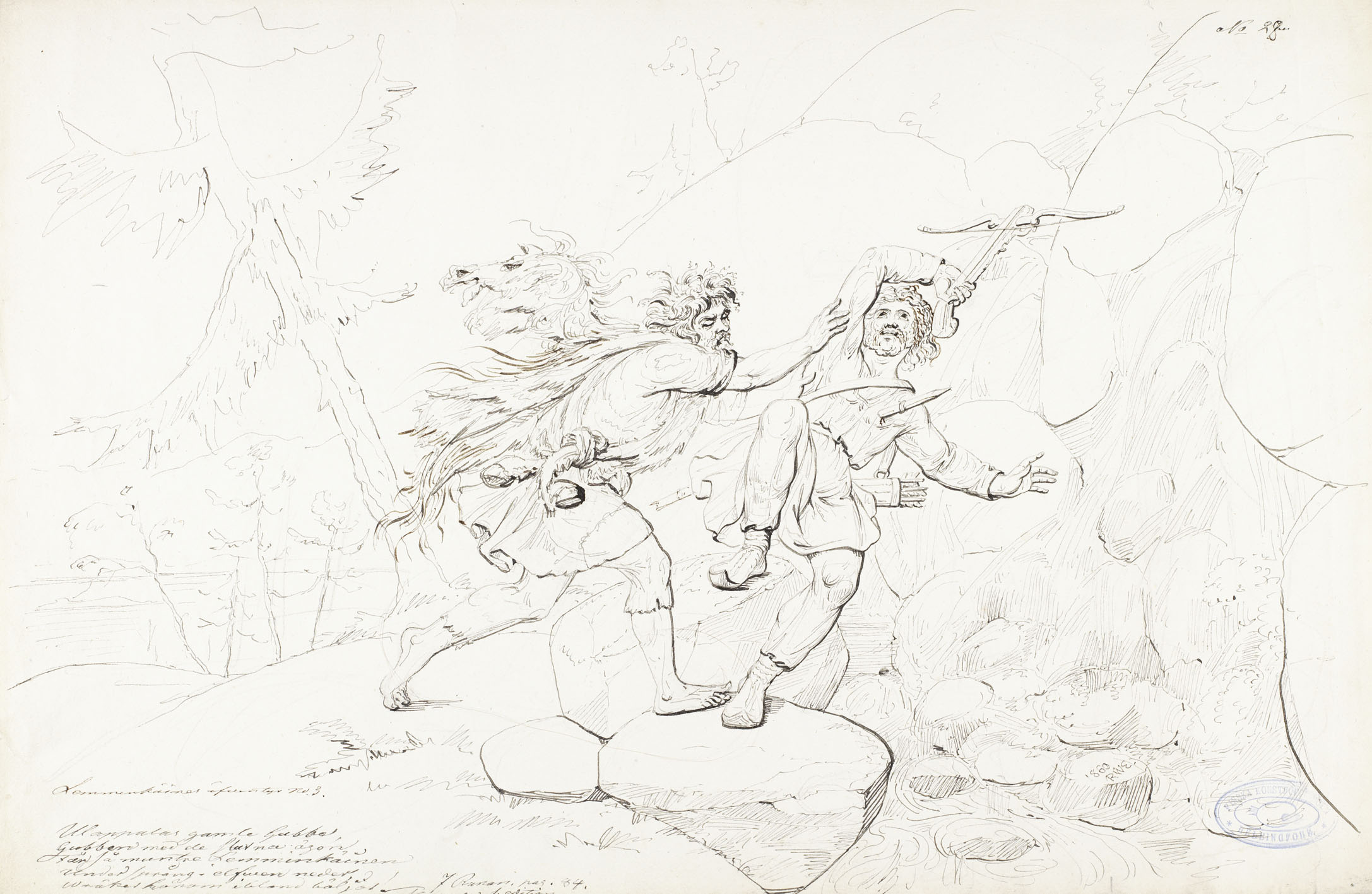
The Death of Lemminkäinen, Robert Wilhelm Ekman, 1860

Canto XV. – Resurrection of Lemminkäinen

Kyllikki notices the comb of Lemminkäinen is oozing blood and shortly after so does his mother and she breaks down weeping. Lemminkäinen's mother sets off to Pohjola. When she arrives she demands of Louhi the location of her son. Louhi tells her several lies. Each time Lemminkäinen's mother replies with anger until Louhi tells her the truth.

The aged mother searches for her son's body. She asks the trees, the path, and the moon, but none can help until she asks the sun, which tells her that her son perished on the banks of the Tuoni river. She hastens to the forge of Ilmarinen and gets him to build her a giant rake of copper and steel. Lemminkäinen's mother—after getting further help from the sun—dredges the river and recovers the remains of her son. The aged mother reassembles her son and reconnects all of the parts into a complete man. She asks a tiny bee to bring her honey from heaven with which she salves her son and coaxes him back to life. After a brief talk, she manages to dissuade him from continuing his ridiculous quest, and they return home. (Note: FLS: Viidestoista Runo)

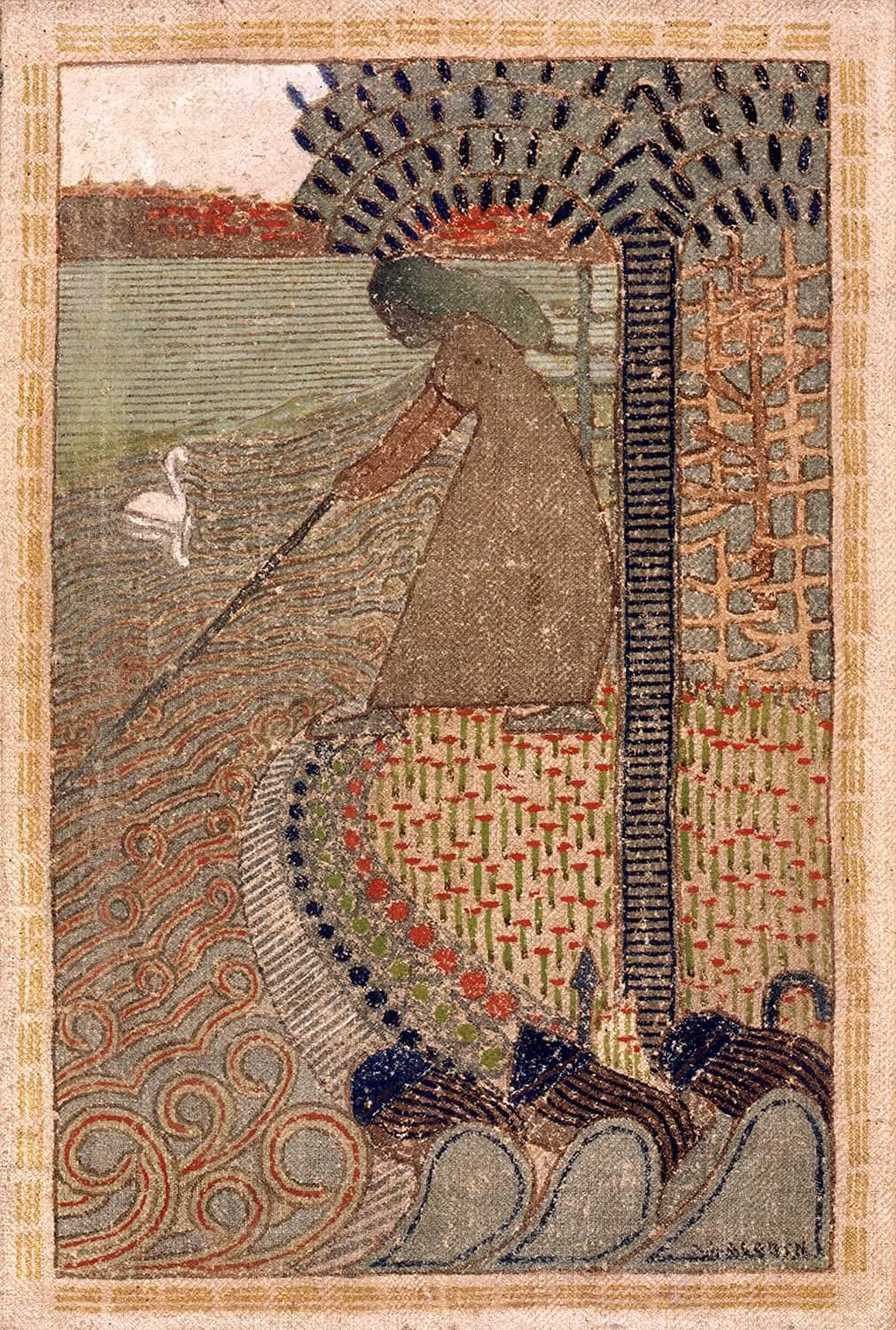
Lemminkäinen's Mother at the River of Tuonela, Joseph Alanen, 1908–1911

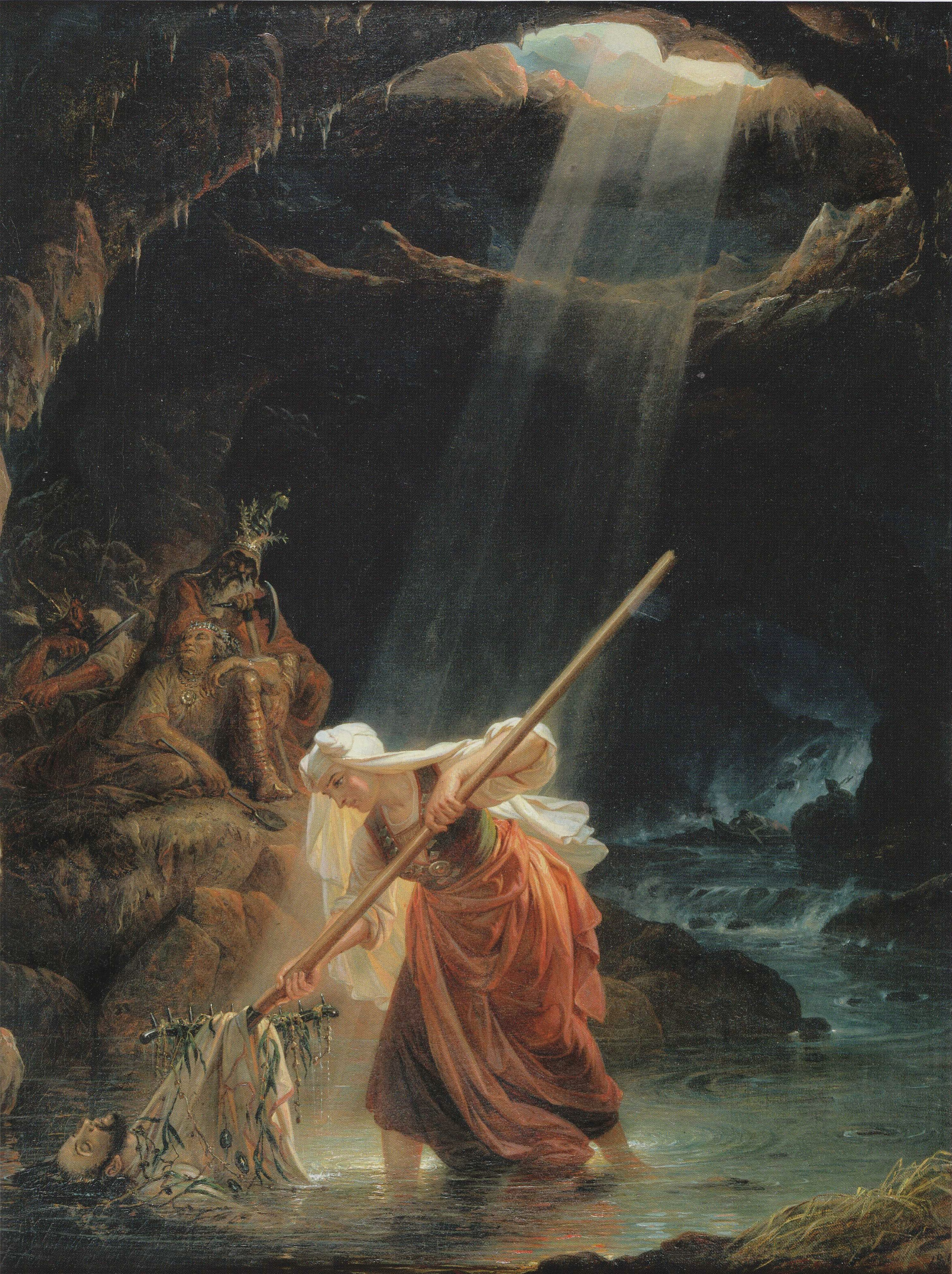
Lemminkäinen's Mother at Tuonela, Robert Wilhelm Ekman, 1862

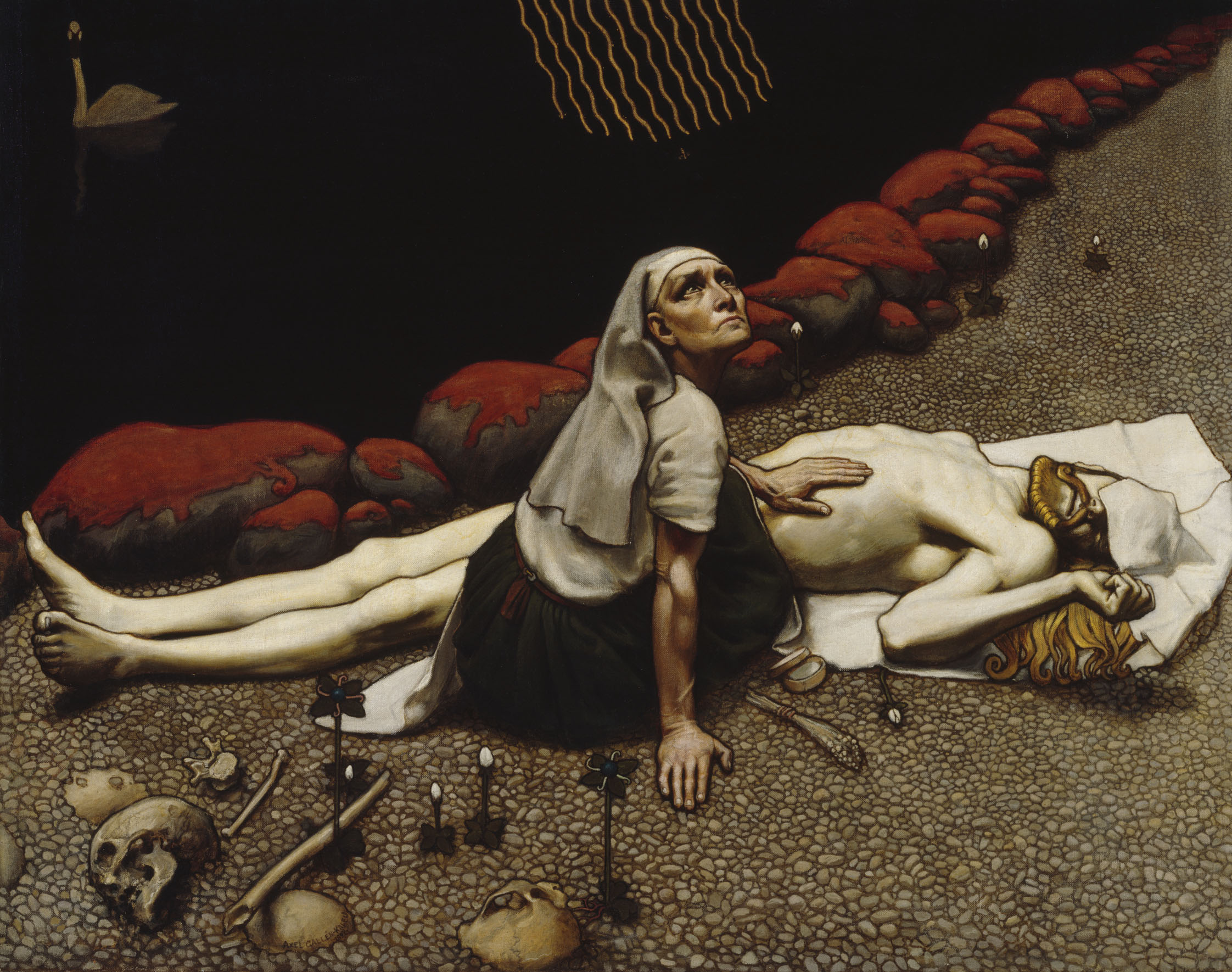
Lemminkäinen's Mother, Akseli Gallen-Kallela, 1897

== Cantos 16 – 18: Second Väinämöinen Cycle ==
Canto XVI. – Väinämöinen's Shipbuilding

Väinämöinen sets to building the ship the maiden of Pohjola tasked him to. He summons Sampsa Pellervoinen to find him wood suited to such a fine vessel. He searches hard and asks many trees if they are suitable but finds none that are until he comes across the mighty oak tree, which he fells and makes into suitable planks for the ship.

Pellervoinen brings the wood to Väinämöinen, who proceeds to cast spells to form the ship, but he lacks three vital words. He laments heavily and slaughters numerous animals to perform extispicy but does not find the words he needs.

Väinämöinen goes to Tuonela to find the words. Tuonetar, the daughter of Tuoni, is washing her clothes by the river and asks Väinämöinen why he wishes to travel to Tuonela. He lies at first but finally tells the truth. Tuonetar warns him that he is foolish and advises him to return home, but Väinämöinen does not. Then old Väinämöinen slips into death's domain and witnesses horror and sadness like none other. Through magic he manages to escape and warns all never to go willingly to Tuonela. (Note: FLS: Kuudestoista Runo)

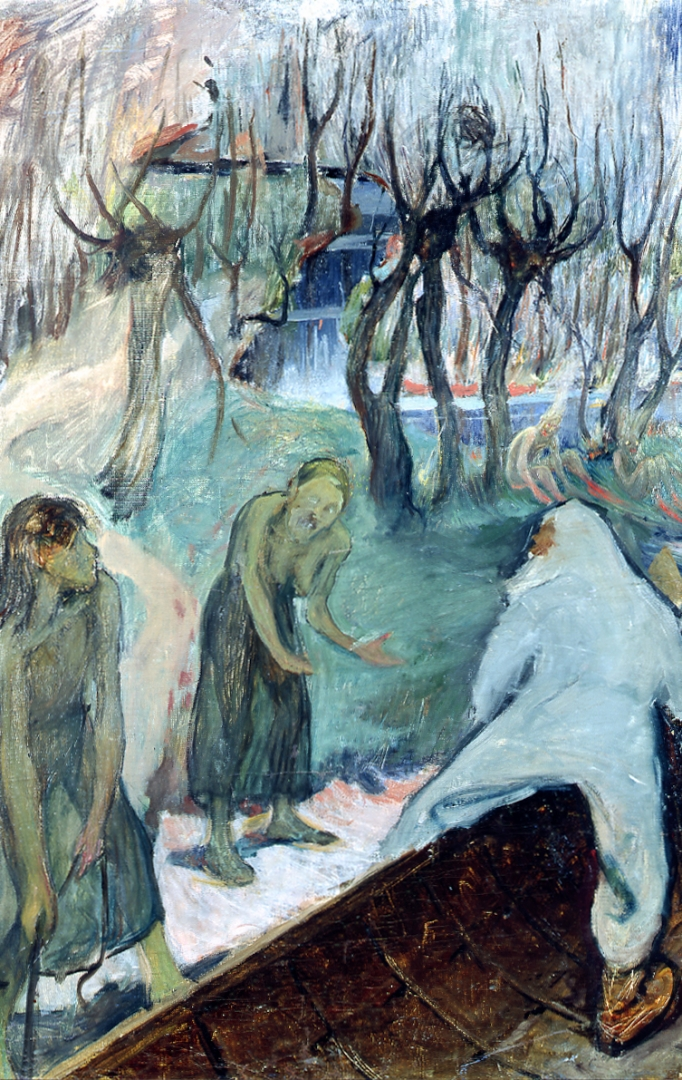
Väinämöinen in Tuonela, Pekka Halonen, 1895–1910

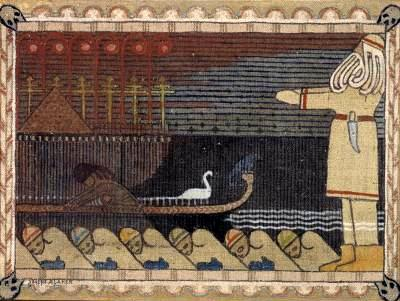
Väinämöinen in Tuonela by Joseph Alanen, c. 1918

Canto XVII. – Väinämöinen and Antero Vipunen

Väinämöinen, on his return, visits the ancient smith Ilmarinen to find where the old giant Antero Vipunen is. Ilmarinen tells him the giant is long since dead, but Väinämöinen goes looking anyway.

Väinämöinen finds the location of Vipunen, although he is now covered in trees and other plant life. He forces his strong steel stake into Vipunen's mouth, which wakes him and Väinämöinen is swallowed whole by the giant. Väinämöinen crafts a skiff and sails end to end in Vipunen's body and, finding no way out, begins to work metal in the stomach of the giant. Vipunen grows concerned and tries his best magic to rid his body of Väinämöinen but the ancient wizard will only leave when he has the ancient words he requires.

Vipunen recites ancient spells and incantations from the dawn of the world, and, when he finishes, Väinämöinen leaves Vipunen's body and continues home. He completes his grand ship with no assistance from hammer or saw. (Note: FLS: Seitsemästoista Runo)

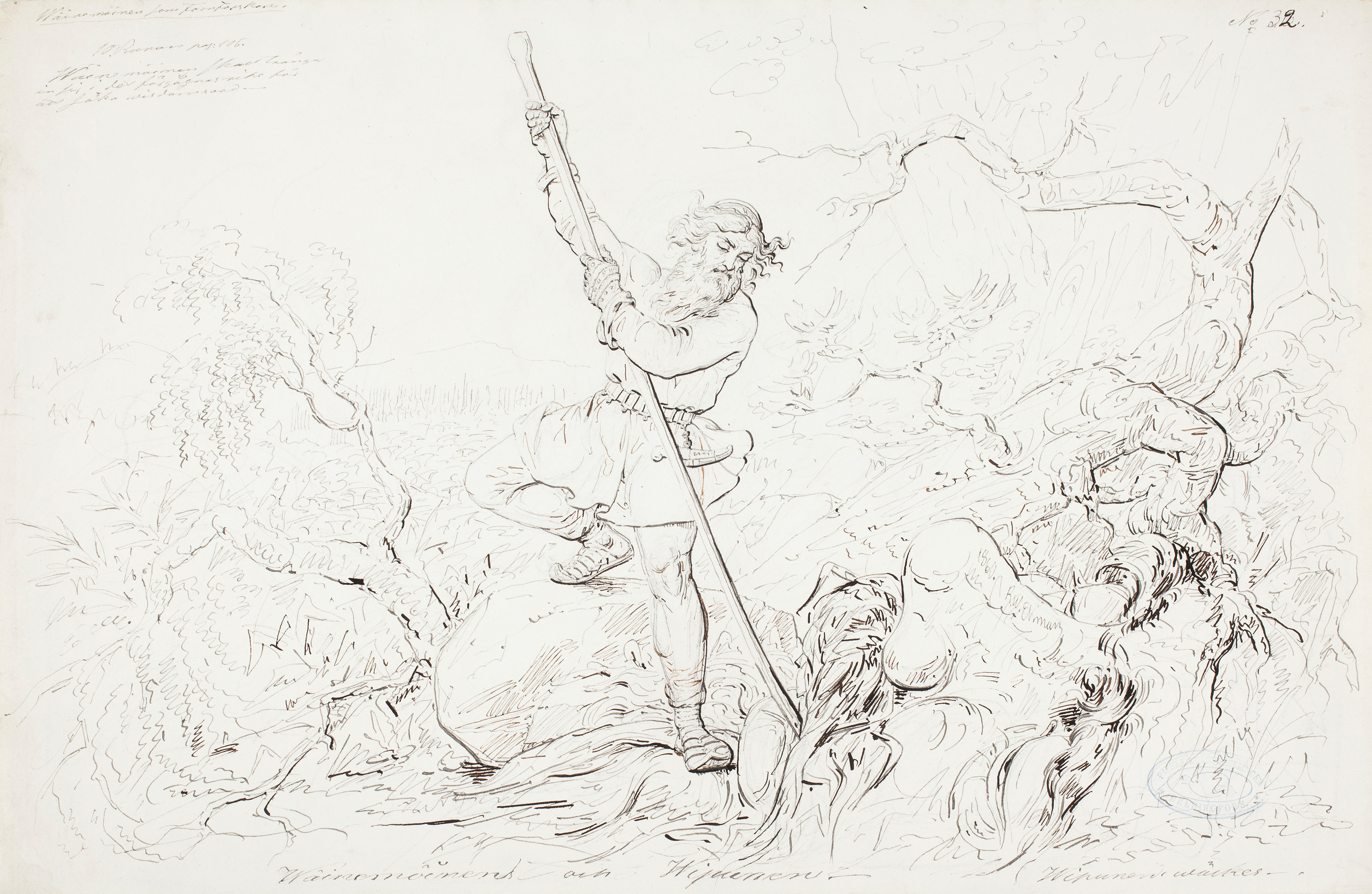
Väinämöinen wakes the giant Antero Vipunen, Robert Wilhelm Ekman, 1860

Canto XVIII. – Väinämöinen and Ilmarinen, Rival Suitors

Väinämöinen sets off to Pohjola to woo the beauteous Northland maiden. On his way he comes across Annikki—Ilmarinen's sister—who asks him where he is going. He tells her many lies but in the end tells her of his purpose. She rushes off to her brother to tell him that a rival suitor is heading to the Northland maiden.

Annikki reaches her brother and informs him of the news. He is gripped with worry and hurries off to prepare for his journey and his wooing. He adorns his sledge with sweet songbirds and prepares for departure with the finest horse in his possession in the harness. He prays to Ukko to clear his path and make for him an easy journey, and he sets off on his journey.

Väinämöinen and Ilmarinen meet each other along the journey. They shout over the waters and snowfields and agree to a friendly pact and to be happy for whoever wins the hand of the beautiful Pohjola maiden.

As the two suitors grow closer, the dogs of Pohjola start barking and the master of Pohja goes to see what the fuss is about. He sees a red boat approaching the Lovers bay and a magnificently decorated sledge approaching along the bay of Sima. He rushes home and asks the pyromancer Suovakko why they are coming. She throws logs on the fire, and they flow with honey. She says that the approaching men are suitors and not warriors.

Louhi quickly runs to the yards to see who is coming. She realises that it is Väinämöinen and Ilmarinen and advises her daughter to choose the aged wizard, for he is rich and magnificent. The daughter has other ideas however, and when Väinämöinen is the first to arrive she tells him that she will not be his wife. (Note: FLS: Kahdeksastoista Runo)

== Cantos 19 – 25: Ilmarinen's Wedding ==
Canto XIX. – Ilmarinen's Trials and Betrothal

Ilmarinen enters the halls of Pohjola and demands to see his betrothed, but Louhi demands several tasks be completed before he can marry her daughter. The first task is to plough a field of vipers. Ilmarinen is distressed and goes to the maiden who advises him on how to complete the task; he crafts a plough of gold and silver and greaves of iron and completes the task.

The next task is to capture the Bear and Wolf of Tuoni. Again he goes distressed to the maiden, who advises him. He completes the task with steel bits and muzzles of iron.

The third and final task is to capture the giant pike without aid of net or rod. Once more he goes to his betrothed, and she advises him. He sets off and casts a mighty fiery eagle with iron talons and wings made of the sides of a boat. The eagle tries numerous times to capture the pike and finally manages it, but it eats the body of the giant fish, leaving only the head. Ilmarinen curses the bird, and it flies off beyond heaven.

Ilmarinen returns to Louhi with the pike head. She is annoyed that he didn't bring the whole pike but agrees to allow the marriage. Väinämöinen returns home and warns the older men never to woo a maiden as rival to a younger man, as it can only lead to torment. (Note: FLS: Yhdeksästoista Runo)

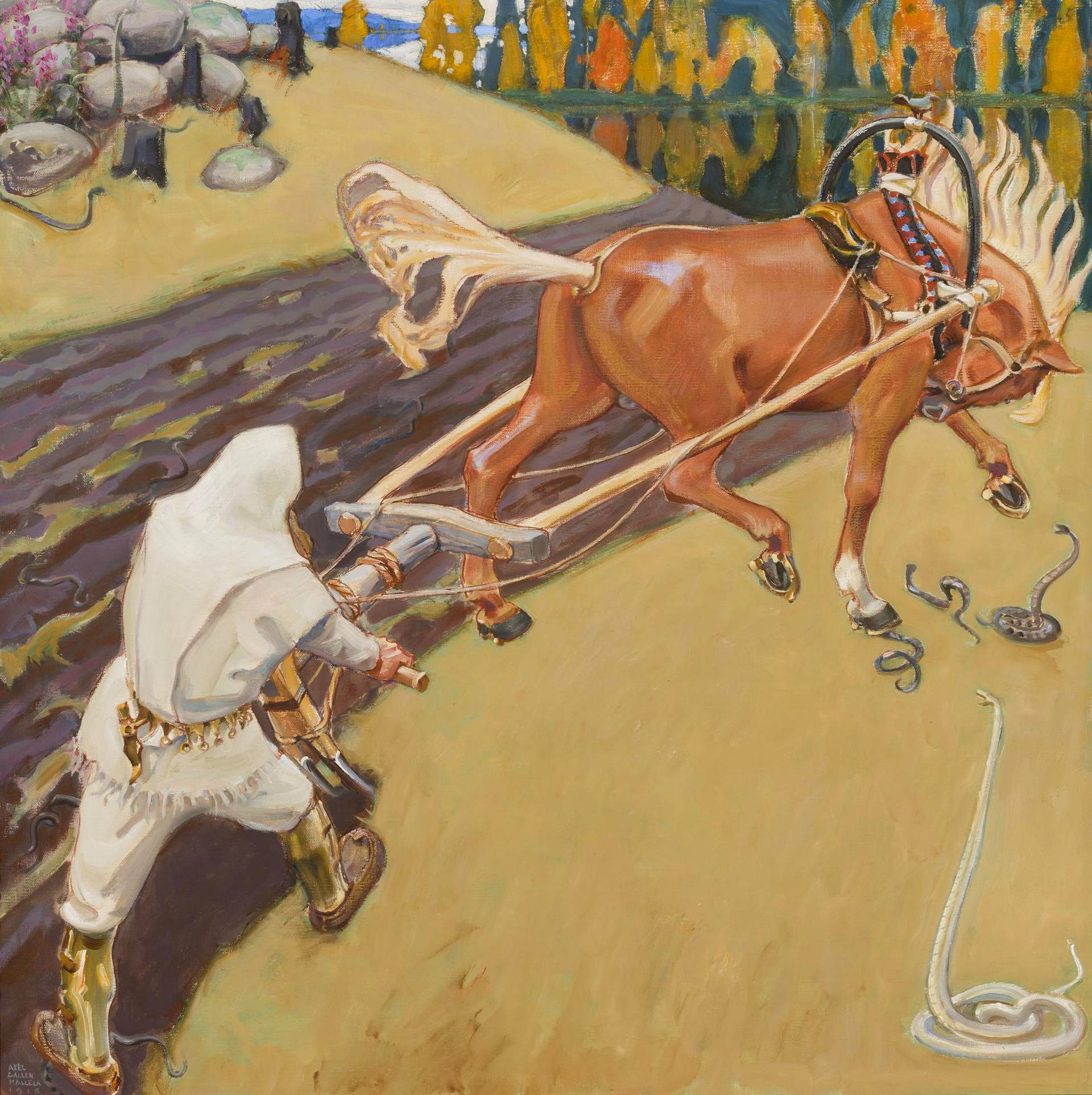
Ilmarinen Ploughs a Field of Vipers, Akseli Gallen-Kallela, 1916 (fi)

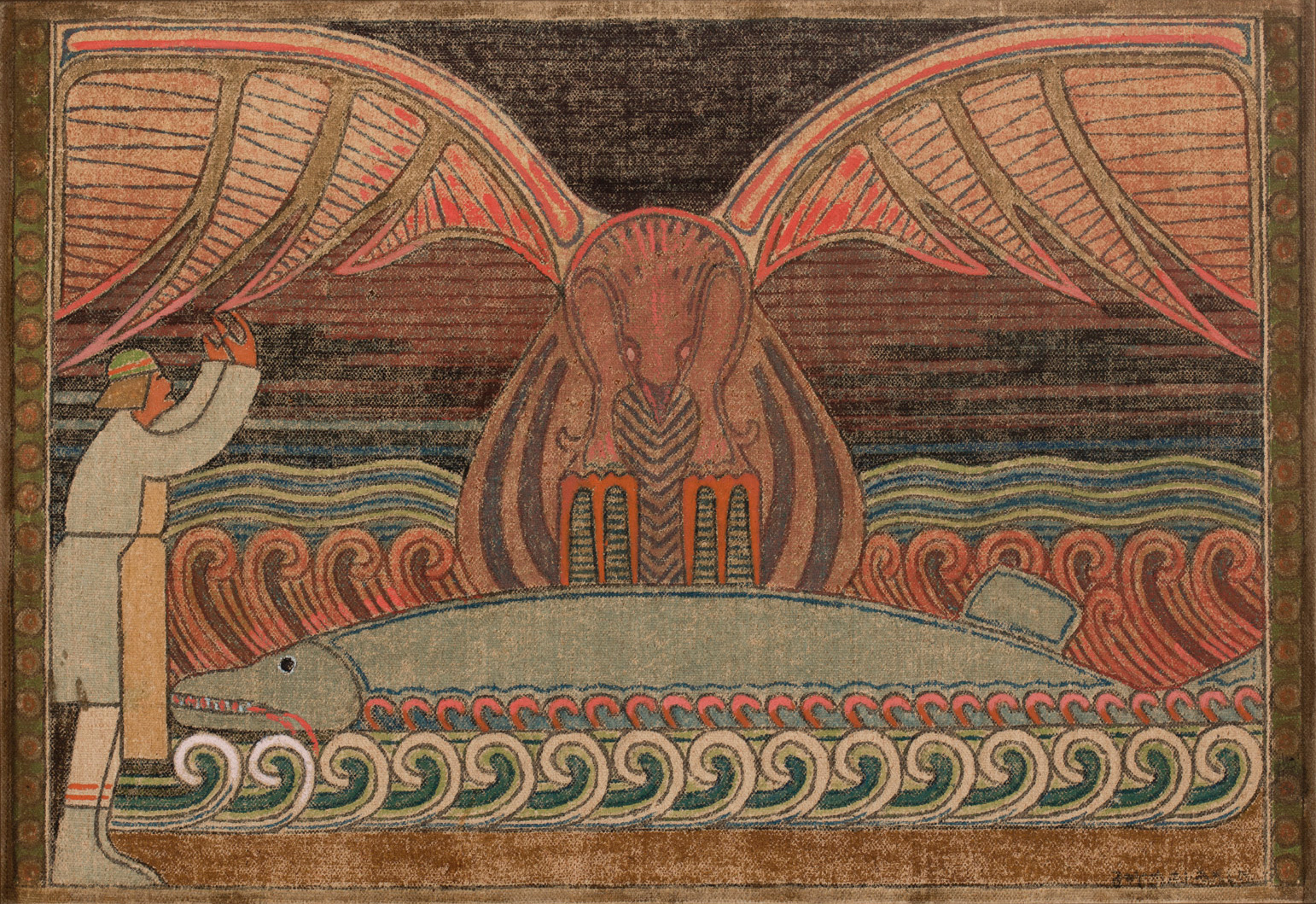
The Eagle and the Pike, Joseph Alanen

Canto XX. – Brewing of the Beer

An ox as tall as the clouds is brought from Karelia to Pohja intended for the great wedding feast, but no one can be found to slaughter it. One day an old man—small enough to fit under a wooden bowl—rises from the sea and slaughters the animal.

Louhi wonders how to make a worthy beer and an old man relates to her how it is done. He tells of the growing of hops and barley, of the magic squirrel of Osmotar and the pine cones he brings. He tells of the magic marten of Osmotar and the magic bear spittle to use as a leavening agent. He tells of the bee of Osmotar and the honey he brings. He tells of the grand wooden barrels with copper bands used to store the feisty beer. Louhi then resolves to make beer, and places it in wooden barrels with copper hoops.

Louhi sends messengers into the land to invite guests and inform them of the great feast and carousal. She warns not to invite Lemminkäinen because of his violent and trouble-causing nature. Väinämöinen is asked to be the minstrel of the wedding. (Note: FLS: Kahdeskymmenes Runo)

Canto XXI. – Ilmarinen's Wedding Feast

Ilmarinen and his entourage arrive at Pohjola and are greeted with the greatest respect, their mounts attended to in the greatest care, and the finest place at the banquet table set for the bridegroom himself.

The feast begins, and the guests are given the finest of Northlands viands, the finest butters, creams, salmon, pork, and breads. Then the ale is served and revelled by the great Väinämöinen, who sings to the guests on the happy occasion.

"Beer, fine drink! Do not give a drink to an idling man. Make the men sing, the golden voices ring out. (Note: FLS: Kahdeskymmenesensimmäinen Runo)

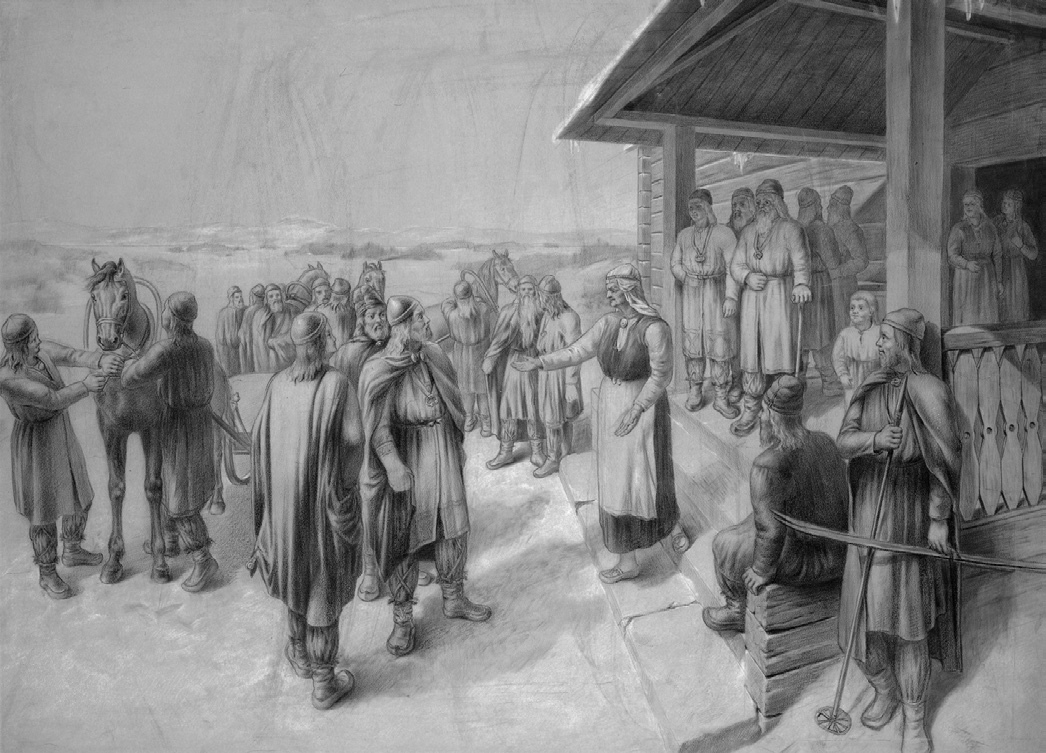
Ilmarinen Arrives as the Groom at Pohjola, charcoal work by Johan Kortman, 1893

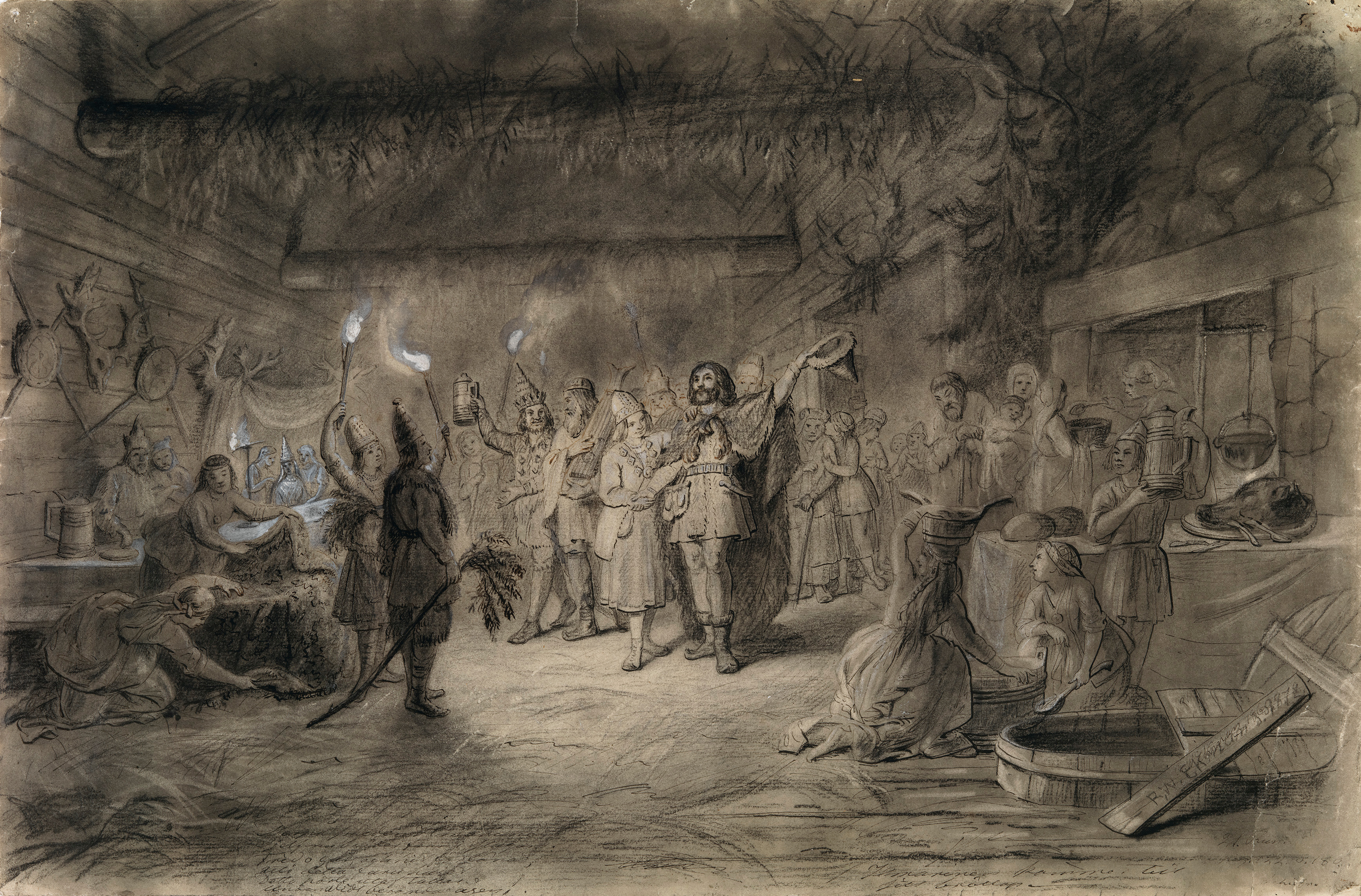
The Wedding at Pohjola, Robert Wilhelm Ekman, 1860–1872

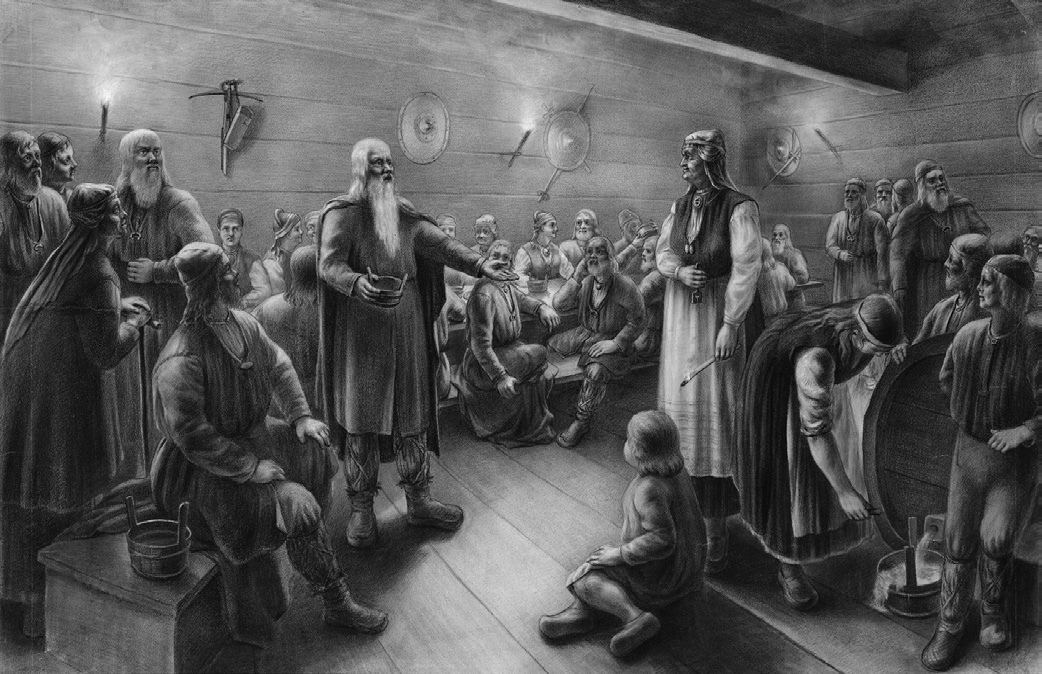
The Wedding at Pohjola, Johan Kortman, 1890

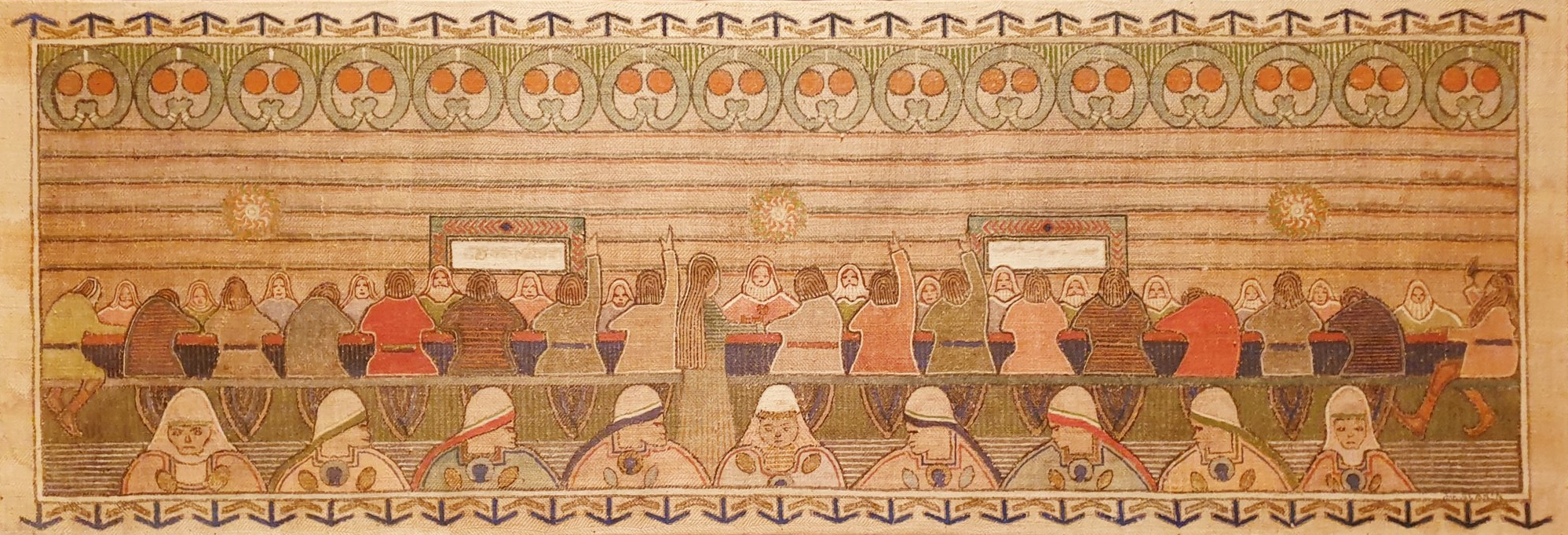
The Feast of Pohjola, Joseph Alanen, 1910–1911

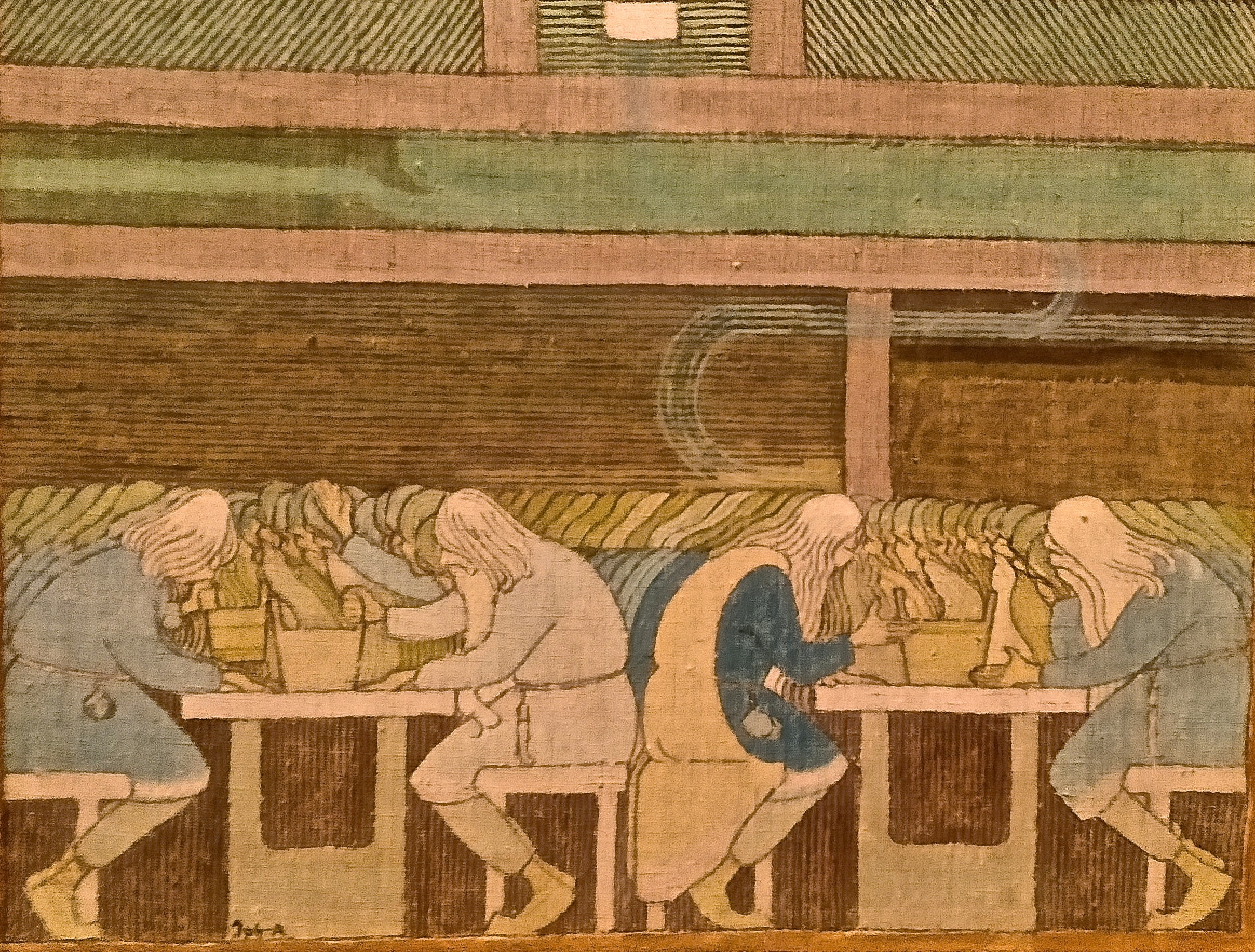
The Feast of Pohjola, Joseph Alanen, 1919–1920

Canto XXII. – Tormenting of the Bride

When the wedding feast was over the preparations for the departure of the bride and her husband are made and the bride is told of her sacrifices she is making to leave her place of birth and go to her husband's home. The bride, although aware of the sacrifices, is still distressed and even though she has wanted to be a wife still has doubts and worries. She is brought to weeping by the older women.

She weeps hard but is told that she is not being taken like a lamb to slaughter. She is taken to a home by a worthy man, to a man who will do her love justice, to a home that has all she has in her parents' home; she has reached womanhood and must not lament. (Note: FLS: Kahdeskymmenestoinen Runo)

Canto XXIII. – Osmotar Advises the Bride

Osmotar, the most beautiful of Kalevala's people and an experienced woman, must instruct the bride in her duties. She instructs the bride in household duties, tells her that she must always be polite even if she is not received well by her in-laws. She instructs the bride on how to care for the livestock and young of the household and how to keep her husband satisfied. She tells the bride how to prepare sauna and firewood and how to greet strangers into the home. The bride is told never to speak ill of anyone in the household when she visits the village.

After the instruction, an old poor woman relates a tale of her married life and the disapproval of her husband's family and of the eventual separation of her and her husband. She relates the story of her unhappy search for her kin and the mistreatment by her sister-in-law and of how even now she is not thought of kindly. (Note: FLS: Kahdeskymmeneskolmas Runo)

Canto XXIV. – Departure of the Bride and Bridegroom

Ilmarinen is instructed on how to treat his bride. He is told to allow her freedoms and not unnecessarily cause her sadness and weeping. He is told to not treat her like a slave or servant and to allow her total roam of the house. Ilmarinen is instructed never to speak with contempt to her and to treat her equally. He is told never to whip her like a slave or animal and not to allow his family to chastise her. He is told to only whip her if she is continually disobedient and never to do it in the presence of others so as to not cause her humiliation.

An old man relates his story of how he could not instruct his wife and how she mistreated him because he spoiled her. He also tells of how he gained her respect and love.

The time has now come for the departure and the bride. Realising this is the last time she will see her birth home, she gets tears in her eyes and tells her woes. Ilmarinen then carries her off to his sledge and they depart Pohjola for Kalevala. They journey for three days and on the third they arrive. (Note: FLS: Kahdeskymmenesneljäs Runo)

Canto XXV. – Homecoming of the Bride and Bridegroom

Ilmarinen and his wife arrive to a great reception. His mother and sister relate the tales of their waiting and of rumour that Ilmarinen's wooing was unsuccessful. An infant speaks ill against the bride, but Ilmarinen's mother reassures the bride that she will be treated well and with respect. She is told that she is lucky to be there, and she will not have to work the mills or fields.

Another feast is laid out, and the ancient sagely wizard Väinämöinen sings songs of praise to the bride and bridegroom, to the mistress, the master, the houses, and the guests.

Väinämöinen sets off home singing and making merry. On the way he damages his sledge. He asks if any of the young can go to Tuonela and fetch what he needs to repair his sledge but none can, so he makes his second trip to Tuonela and brings back what he requires and repairs his sledge and heads back home. (Note: FLS: Kahdeskymmenesviides Runo)

== Cantos 26 – 30: Second Lemminkäinen Cycle ==
Canto XXVI. – Lemminkäinen's Journey to Pohjola

One day Lemminkäinen hears shouts and revelling coming from the village and realises that there is a wedding in Pohjola and is angry that he was not invited. He calls to his mother to prepare his things for battle again. She tries to dissuade him, but he has none of it.

Lemminkäinen's old and loving mother warns him of many deaths waiting for him. She warns him of the fiery river with a fiery island and the eagle of fire. She warns him of the trench of fire filled with the remains of a thousand heroes who have tried to pass. She warns him of the narrow gate of Pohjola, where a wolf will rush him and a bear will crush him. She warns him that when he enters Pohjola more death awaits him. She warns him of the heaven-high fence of snakes and of the men who will defeat him by song or blade. Lemminkäinen does not listen and he sets off on his journey and meets with all the deaths his mother mentioned and manages to defeat all of them. (Note: FLS: Kahdeskymmeneskuudes Runo)

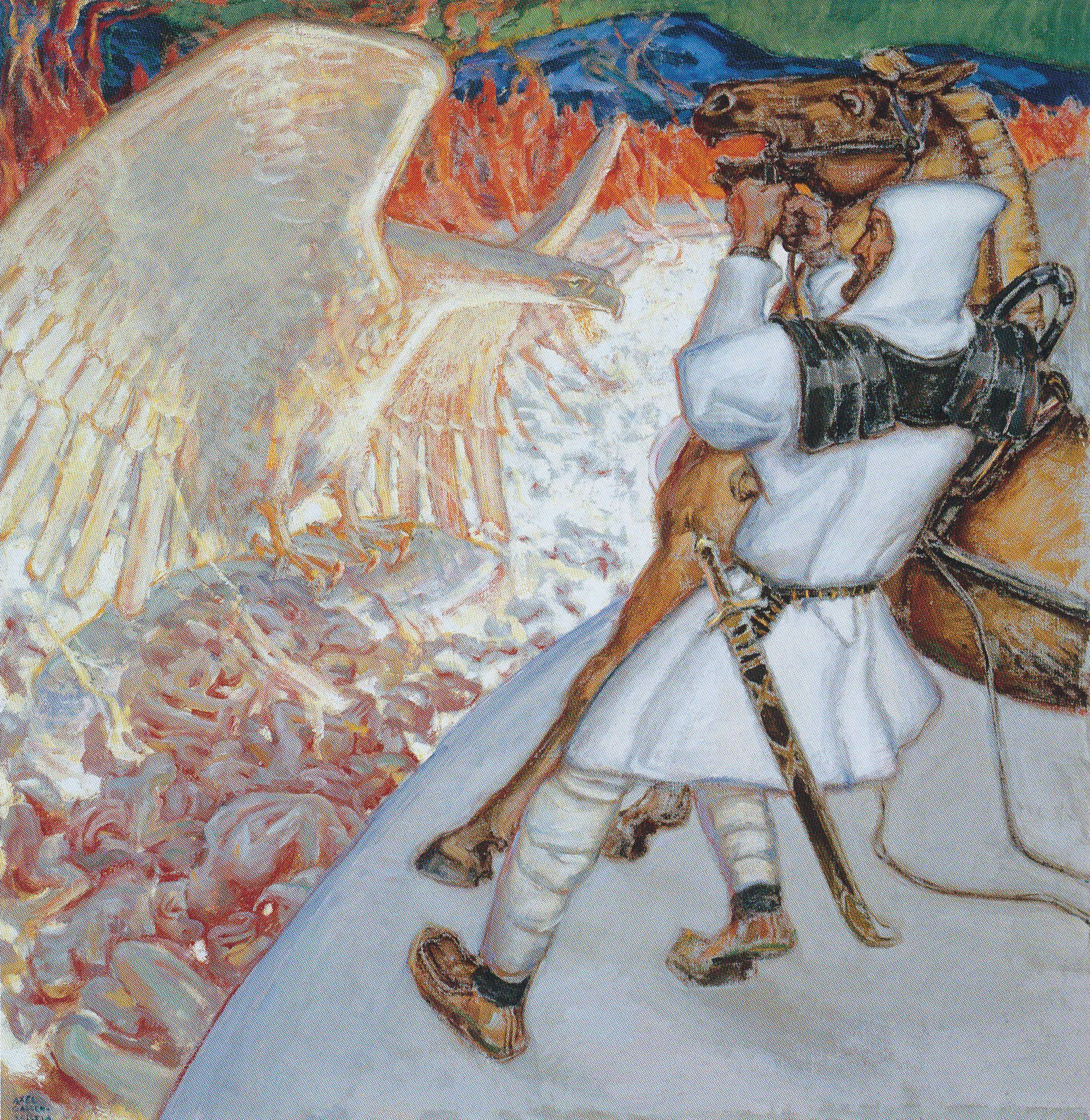
Lemminkäinen at the River of Fire, Akseli Gallen-Kallela, 1920

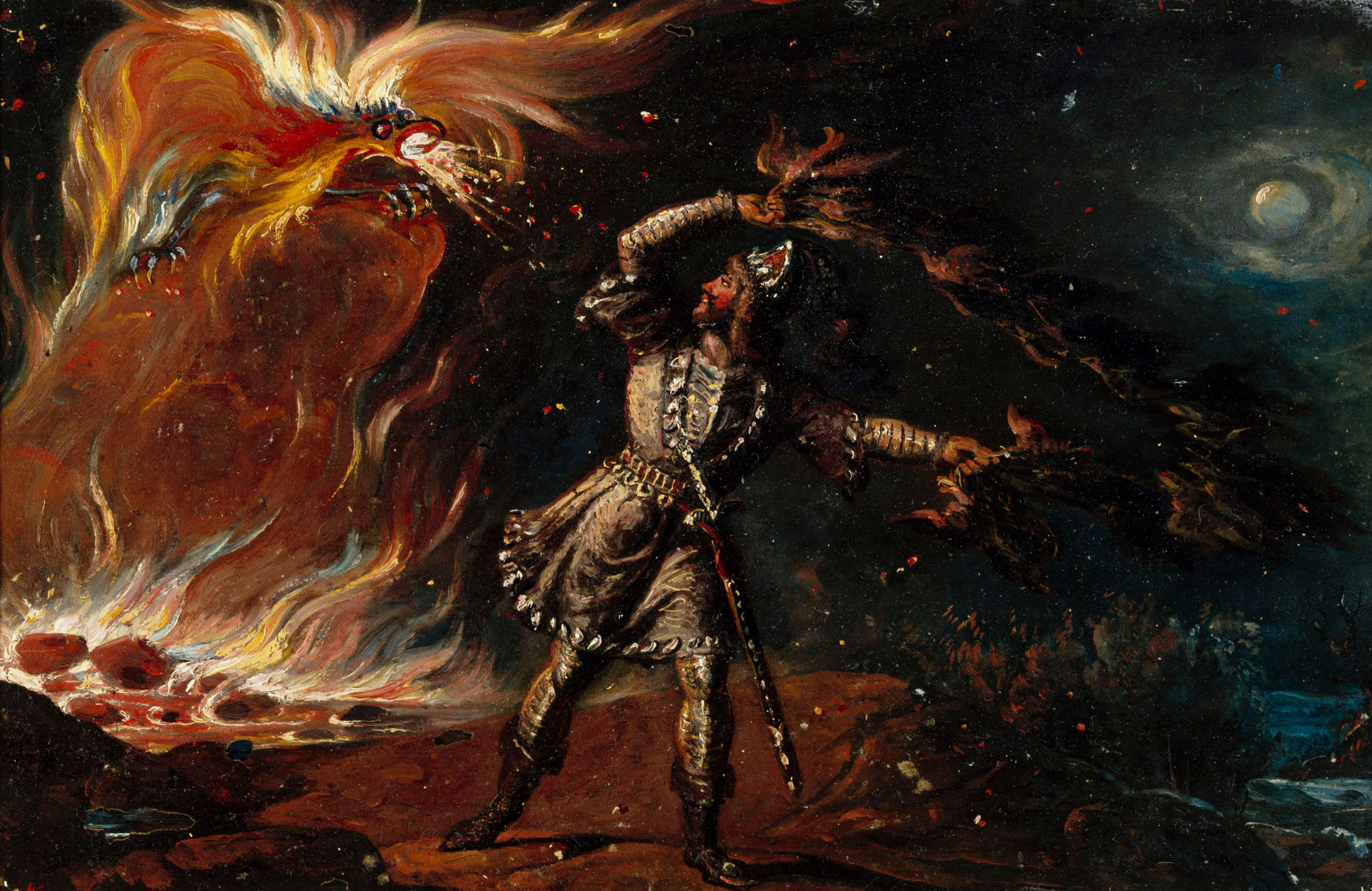
Lemminkäinen and the Fiery Eagle, Robert Wilhelm Ekman, 1867

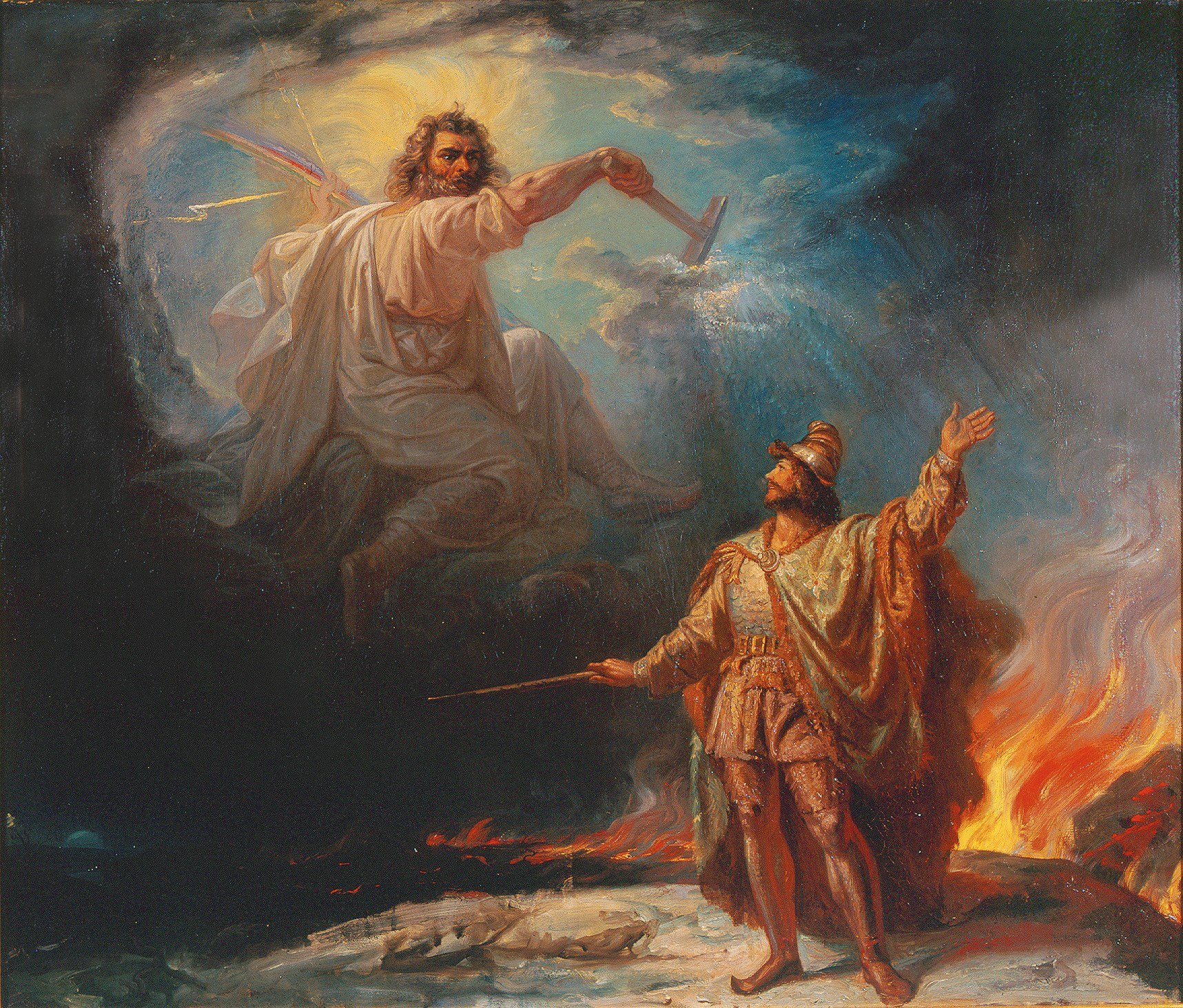
Lemminkäinen at the Fiery Lake, Robert Wilhelm Ekman, c. 1867, depicting the call for help from Ukko

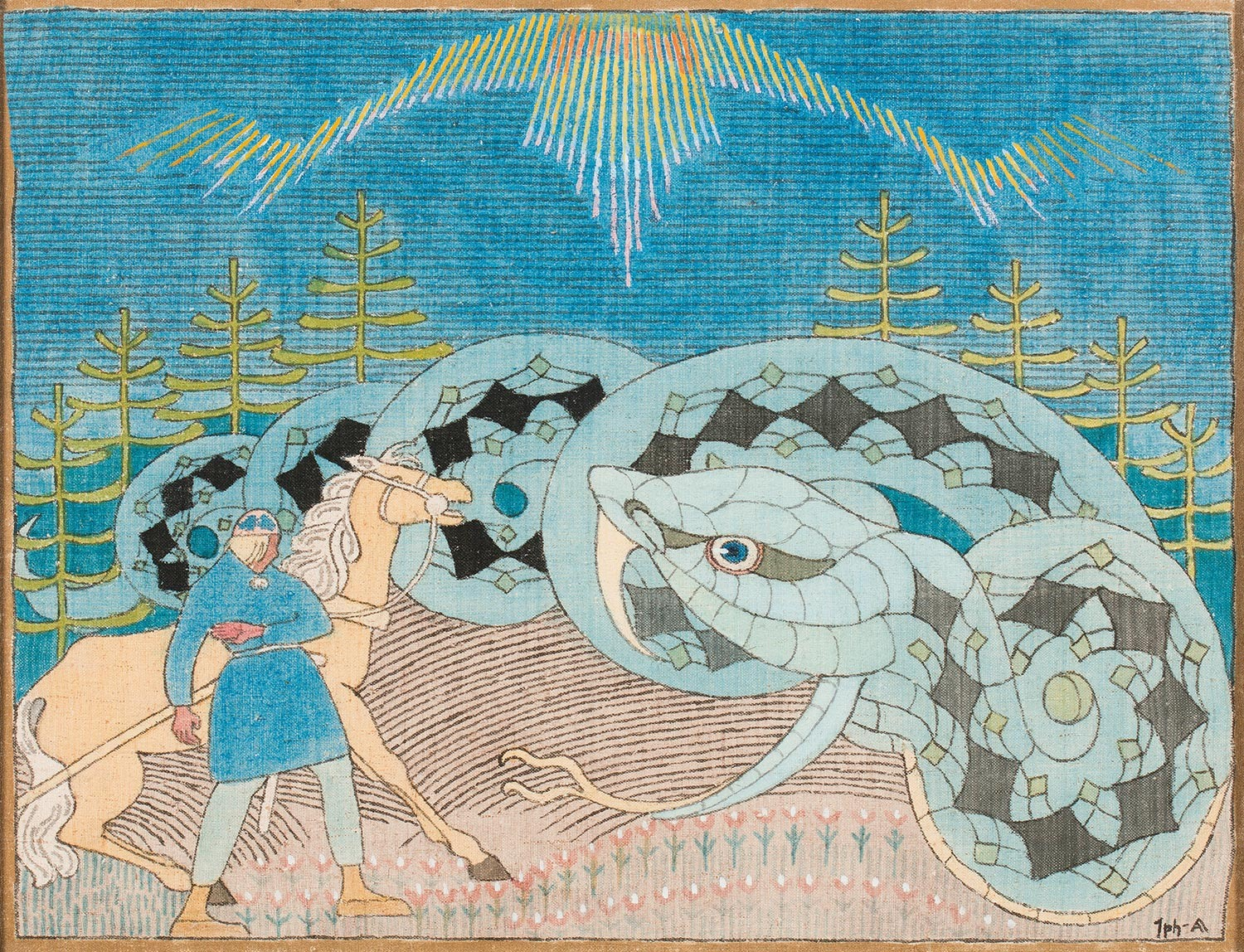
Lemminkäinen and the Great Snake, Joseph Alanen, 1919–1920

Canto XXVII. – Duel at Pohjola

Young Lemminkäinen arrives in Pohjola and walks into the great hall, where the master of Pohjola sits at the head of the table. They exchange words, and Lemminkäinen demands service. He is told the feast is over, which makes him very angry. He shouts his anger at not being invited and demands a drink. Louhi gets her maid to bring a mug of beer, which is filled with serpents. Lemminkäinen removes and kills the serpents and drinks the foul beer. He demands more beer be brought for which he will pay.

The master of Pohjola grows furious, and a magical contest begins that Lemminkäinen wins. The master of Pohjola is still angry and challenges Lemminkäinen to a duel with blades. They measure up and, as the master of Pohjola has the greater blade, Lemminkäinen allows him to take the first thrust and thus a great battle begins in which the master of Pohjola loses his head to Lemminkäinen's blade. Louhi grows livid and summons up a thousand soldiers of Pohjola to march against Lemminkäinen and his kind. Lemminkäinen flees Pohjola. (Note: FLS: Kahdeskymmenesseitsemäs Runo)

Canto XXVIII. – Lemminkäinen's Mother

Lemminkäinen rushes home in the form of an eagle. He arrives home and is greeted by his mother, whom he informs of his trouble; she scolds him heavily for not heeding her warnings.

Lemminkäinen's old mother makes him vow never to go to battle again and tells him of an island where his father hid when he returned from battle once before. She tells him to hide for three years. (Note: FLS: Kahdeskymmeneskahdeksas Runo)

Canto XXIX. – Isle of Refuge

Lemminkäinen sets sail for Saari, the island of refuge and sails for three days. When he reaches the island he asks the women of the island if there is room for him there, and they allow him refuge. He asks if there is a house for him to stay and proceeds to sing to the women of the island and wins their hearts. He is in favor with all but one of the women of the island. The lonely woman curses him.

The men folk of the island return from war and proceed to group against him, so Lemminkäinen is forced to leave. He sails on but his boat is ruined in a storm. He lands on a small island and is given food and a new boat by the mistress. He sails home and reaches familiar shores, but he perceives a problem. When he lands and heads for home he finds his lands and home destroyed, and he weeps for the loss of his home but most of all for his dear mother.

Lemminkäinen notices a path leading to the inner forest, and he follows it and finds his mother in hiding. She tells him of the destruction wrought on his people by the soldiers of Pohjola. He tells her that they will build new homes and that Pohjola will have deadly war raged upon them. He then proceeds to tell his mother about his adventures on the island and of his forceful eviction. (Note: FLS: Kahdeskymmenesyhdeksäs Runo)

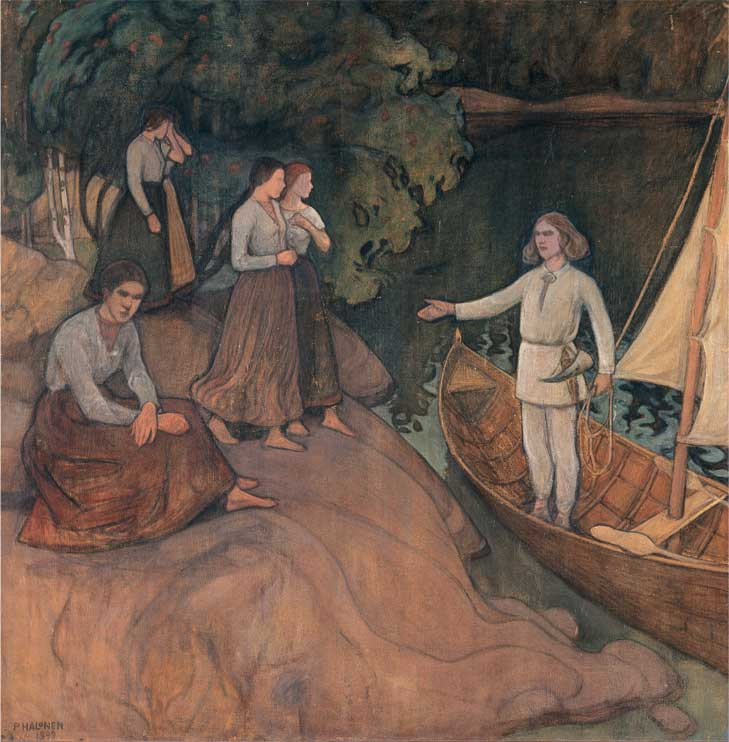
The Departure of Lemminkäinen from Saari, Pekka Halonen, 1899

Canto XXX. – Lemminkäinen and Tiera

Lemminkäinen resolves to go back to Pohjola and seek revenge for the attack on his people. He goes to his old comrade Tiera and asks him to join him. They set sail for battle. The mistress of Pohjola sends a frost to the waters to freeze the boat and its occupants. Lemminkäinen confronts Pakkanen, the personification of frost, and tells of his origin, which subdues the frost.

Lemminkäinen and Tiera leave the ship and head over the ice. They struggle on for days lamenting their situation. Lemminkäinen offers a charm against enchantment and fashions two powerful steeds and the companions ride home together. (Note: FLS: Kolmaskymmenes Runo)

== Cantos 31 – 36: Kullervo Cycle ==
Canto XXXI. – Untamo and Kalervo

Three brothers are carried to various parts of the world. Of the brothers, Kalervo is carried to Karelia, and Untamo is left where he is. The brothers never get along, with Untamo always taking things from Kalervo. After a while Untamo begins threatening Kalervo, and they go to war. Kalervo's people are wiped out bar one, a pregnant woman, who gives birth to a boy she names Kullervo.

Kullervo grows quickly and after three months vows to avenge the destruction of his father and his people. Untamo, naturally worried, tries to destroy Kullervo by drowning, burning, and hanging but none work, so he puts Kullervo to work. Kullervo is tasked to care for an infant, but he kills the babe. He is tasked to cut trees, so he levels the forest and renders the land barren. He is tasked to build a fence, so he builds it sky high so none can pass. Untamo finally sells Kullervo as a slave to the great smith of Kalevala, Ilmarinen. (Note: FLS: Kolmaskymmenesensimmäinen Runo)

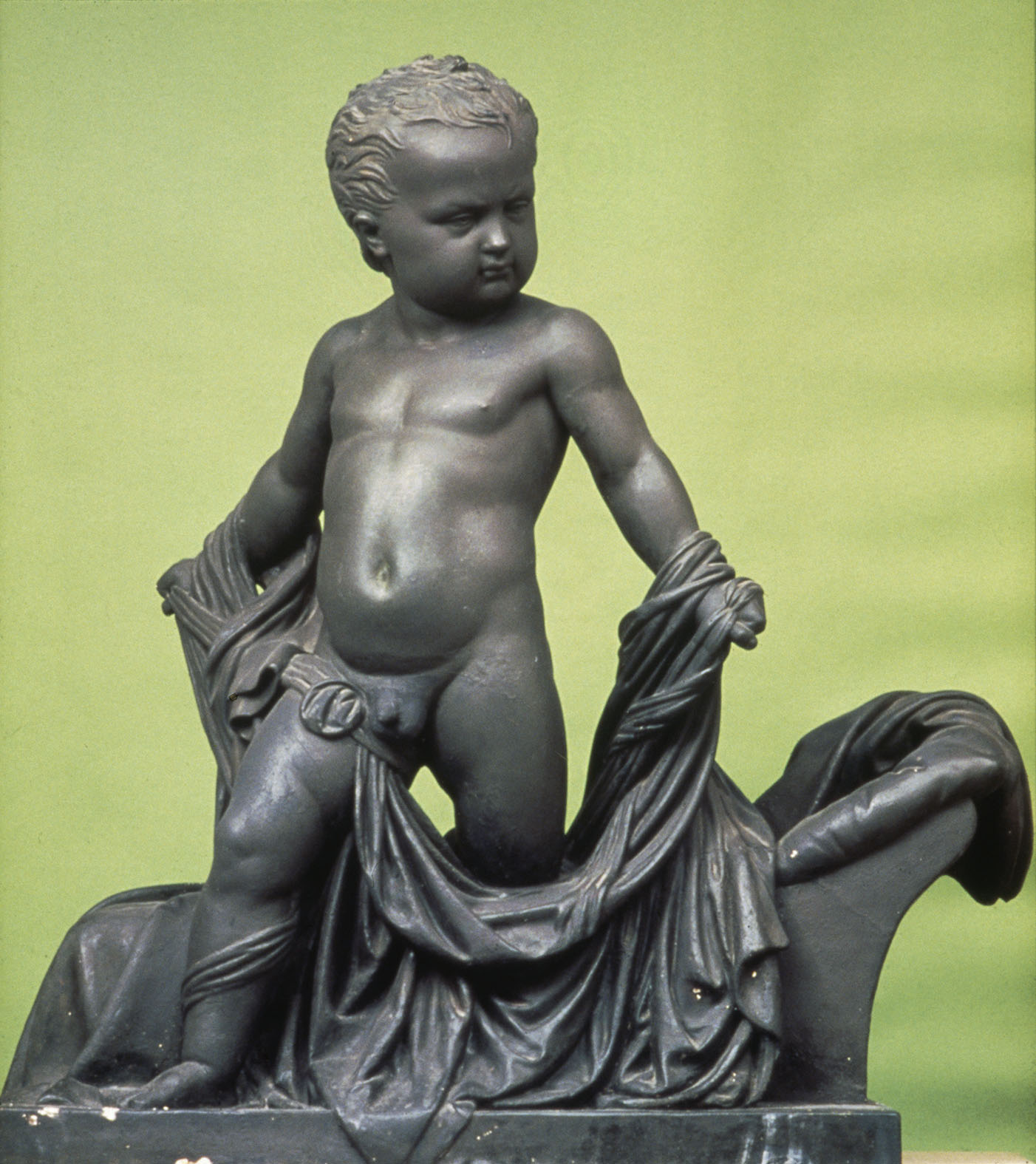
Kullervo Tearing His Swaddling Clothes, Carl Eneas Sjöstrand, 1858

Canto XXXII. – Kullervo as a Shepherd

Kullervo goes to Ilmarinen's wife in search of work. She tasks him as a cowherd and bakes him a loaf of bread for his lunch but cruelly bakes a stone into it. She utters magic charms for their protection, for the healthy production of milk, for safe passage and protection against animals. She then sends the cattle out into the fields to be watched by Kullervo. (Note: FLS: Kolmaskymmenestoinen Runo)

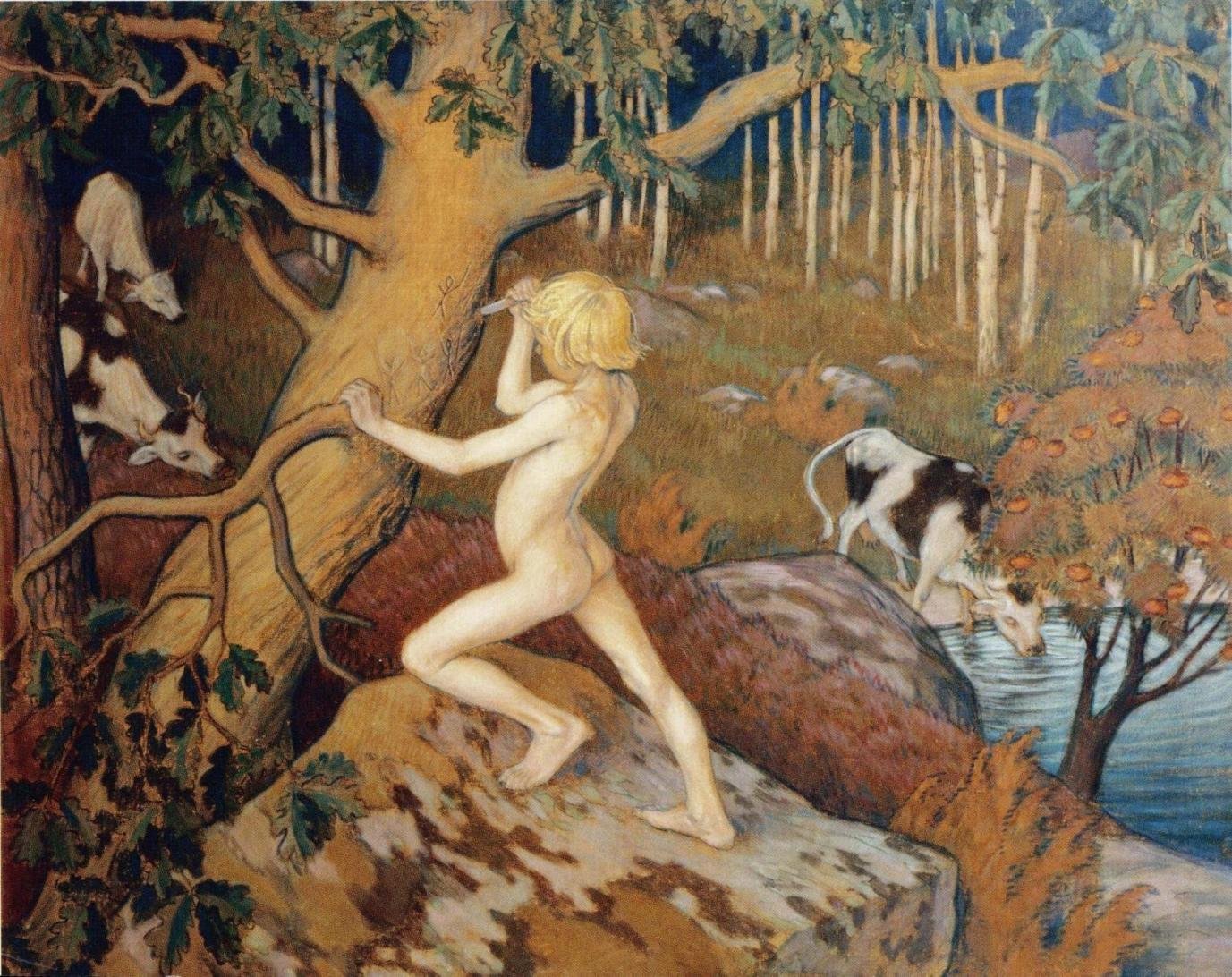
Episode from Kalevala (Kullervo carves his name into an oak), Väinö Blomstedt, 1897

Canto XXXIII. – Death of Ilmarinen's Wife

Kullervo goes about his job as herdsman, lamenting his lowly status and dry bread meal and his master's luxury. He prays to Ukko to shine the sun on him and not Ilmarinen and his family. In the late afternoon he settles down to eat his loaf. He cuts into the loaf and his knife is broken on the stone; this he laments heavily and vows revenge on Ilmarinen's wife as the knife was the only keepsake of his lost people.

Kullervo sends the cattle into the mouths of wolves and bears and by magic gives the bears the appearance of cattle. He makes a pipe from the bone of a cow and brings the cattle home.

Ilmarinen's wife hears the homecoming and goes out to inspect the herd and perform her milking. As she bends down and begins to pull on a teat, the wolves and bears bear down on her and tear her to shreds. She pleads to Kullervo to come to her aid, but he refuses and she dies. (Note: FLS: Kolmaskymmeneskolmas Runo)

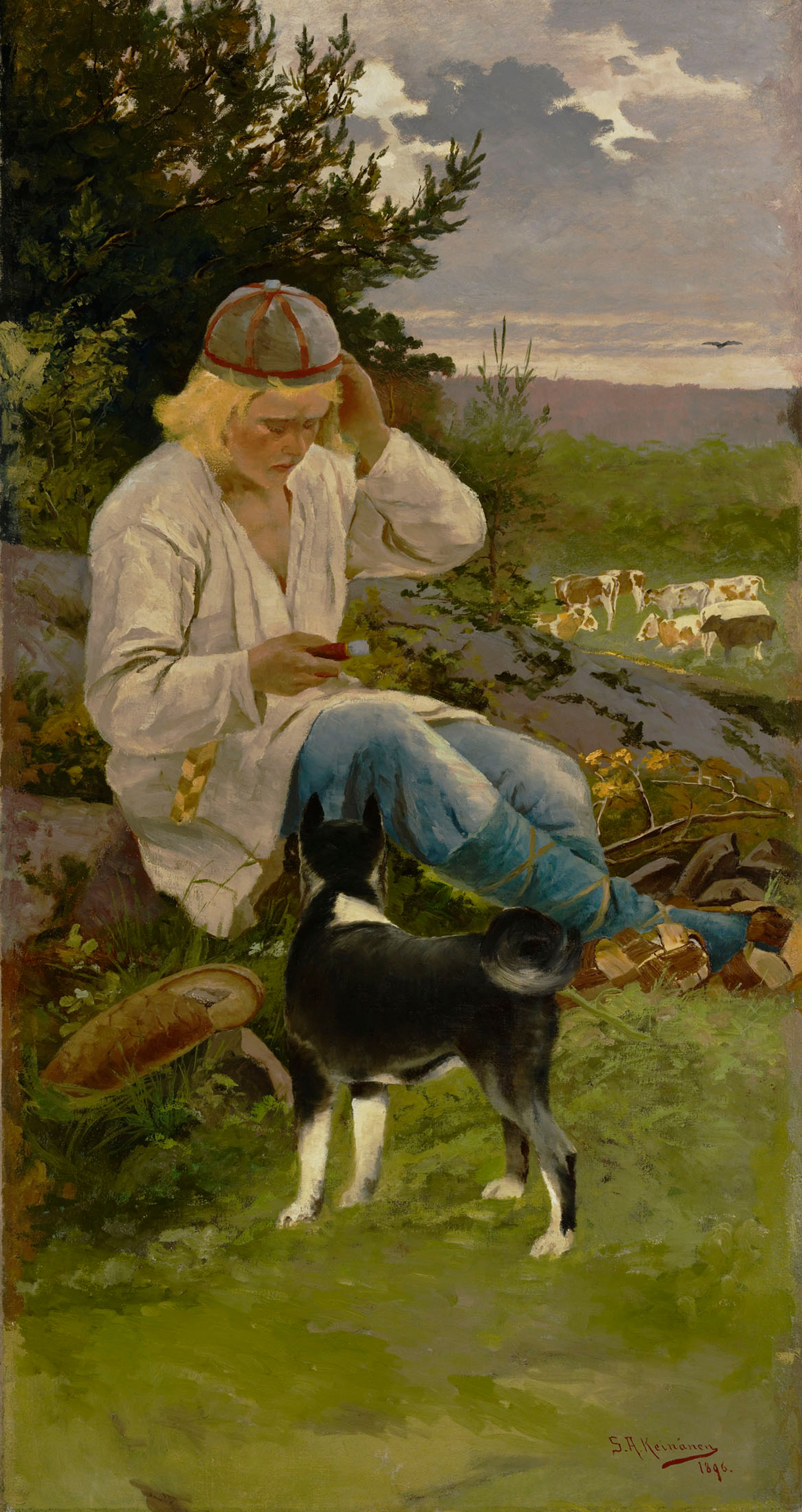
Kullervo with His Herds, Sigfrid Keinänen, 1896

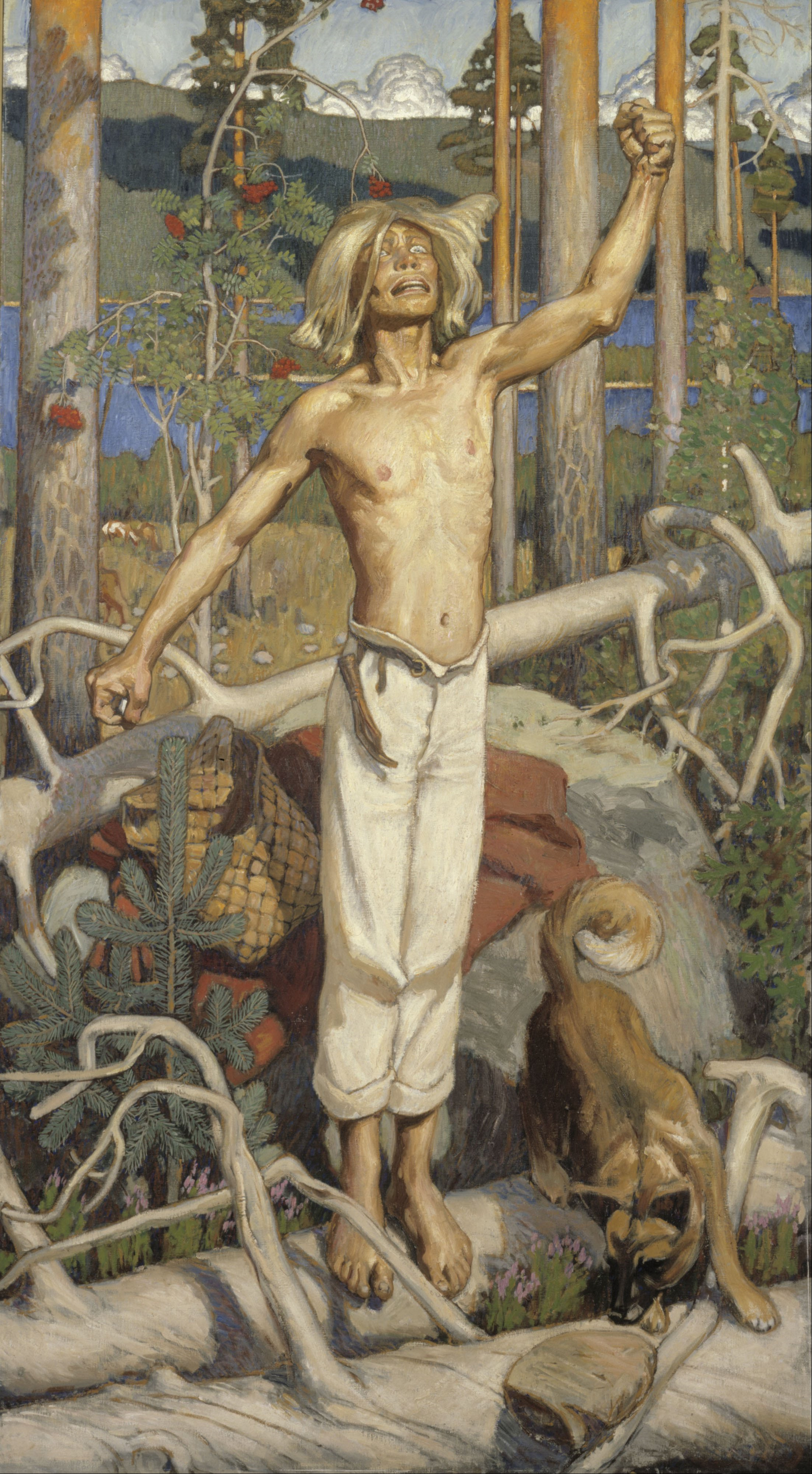
Kullervo's Curse, Akseli Gallen-Kallela, 1899 (fi)

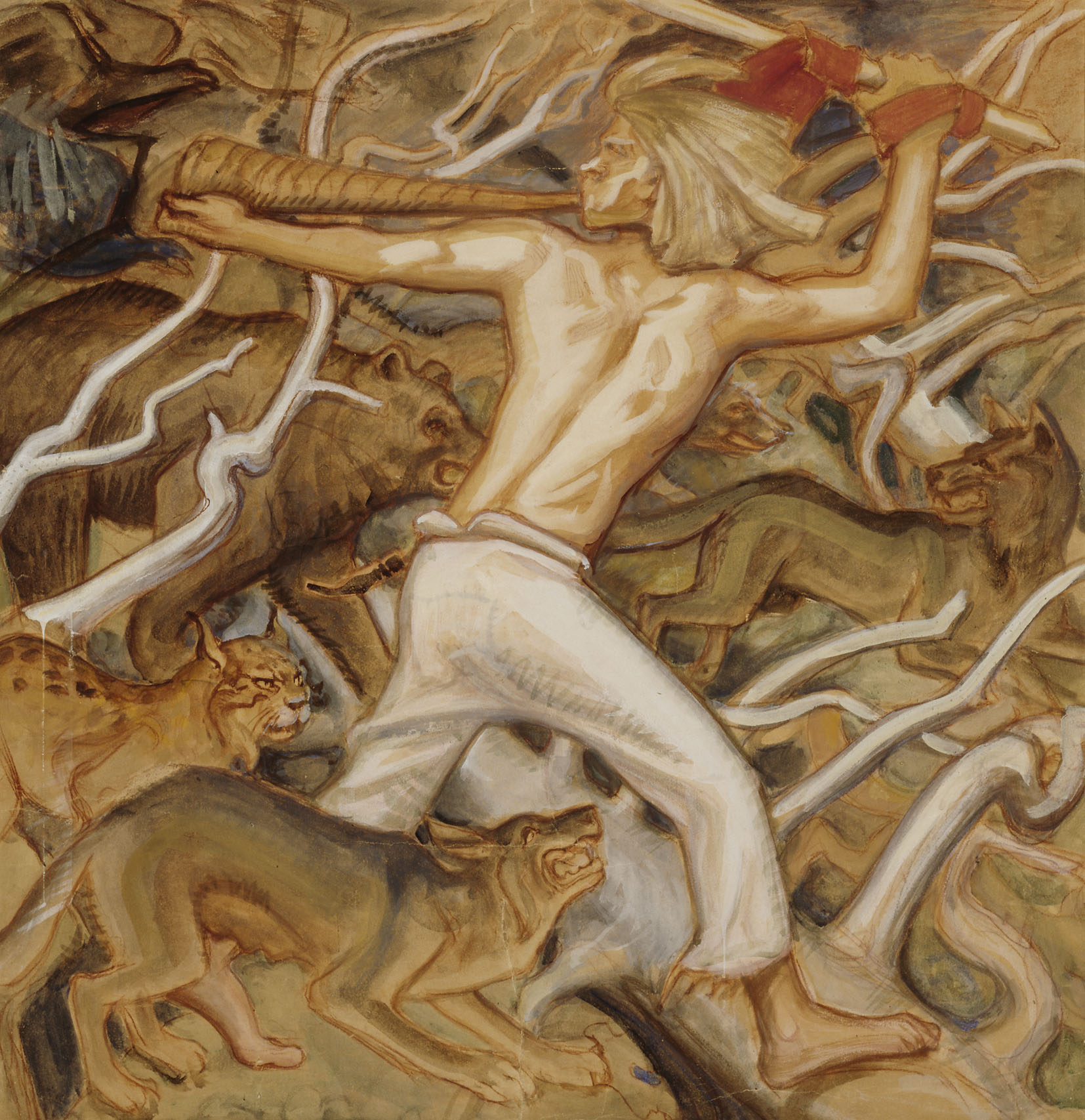
Kullervo Herding his Wild Flocks, Akseli Gallen-Kallela, 1917

Canto XXXIV. – Kullervo Finds his Family

Kullervo flees from the homestead of Ilmarinen and wanders through the forest. He calls to Ukko never to allow one so wretched and unfortunate as he be born again. He meets the Maiden of the Forest, who tells him that his family are not all dead—they are alive and well on Lapland's borders.

Kullervo walks for three days and finally finds his family's homestead. His mother greets him and informs him that his sister has vanished and probably died. (Note: FLS: Kolmaskymmenesneljäs Runo)

Canto XXXV. – Kullervo Finds his Sister

Kullervo attempts to do chores around his family farm but proves to be hopeless at everything. His father sends him to pay taxes and on his way back he meets a young maiden. He drags her into his sleigh and seduces her with rich fabrics and jewels. They sleep together and wake the following morning.

Kullervo and the maiden tell of their clans. They realize they are siblings, and the maiden jumps in shame from the sleigh and to her death. Kullervo weeps with sadness and shame. He discards his sleigh and rides home to tell his mother. He tells her he will kill himself, but she pleads against it. Kullervo promises to go to Untamo and avenge the destruction of his people. (Note: FLS: Kolmaskymmenesviides Runo)

Canto XXXVI. – Kullervo's Victory and Death

Kullervo prepares to do battle with the destroyer of his people, Untamo. His mother begs him to remain, but he refuses, saying it is noble to fall in battle. His mother asks him who will care for his family, but he dismisses her pleas. Kullervo asks his family who will weep for his death, but only his mother says she will. He sets off for battle.

On his way to battle several messengers come to inform him of tragedy at his home, but he does not stop and carries on to Untamola. When he arrives he lays waste to Untamo's entire tribe and destroys all of the buildings, leaving nothing standing.

On Kullervo's return home he finds the homestead deserted and cold with only Musti, his mother's little black dog as company, he retires to the forest and, turning his sword's point to his chest, thrusts himself to his death.

Kullervo, Kalervo's offspring,

With the very bluest stockings,

On the ground the haft set firmly,

On the heath the hilt pressed tightly,

Turned the point against his bosom,

And upon the point he threw him,

Thus he found the death he sought for,

Cast himself into destruction.

Even so the young man perished,

Thus died Kullervo the hero,

Thus the hero's life was ended,

Perished thus the hapless hero.

(Note: FLS: Kolmaskymmeneskuudes Runo)

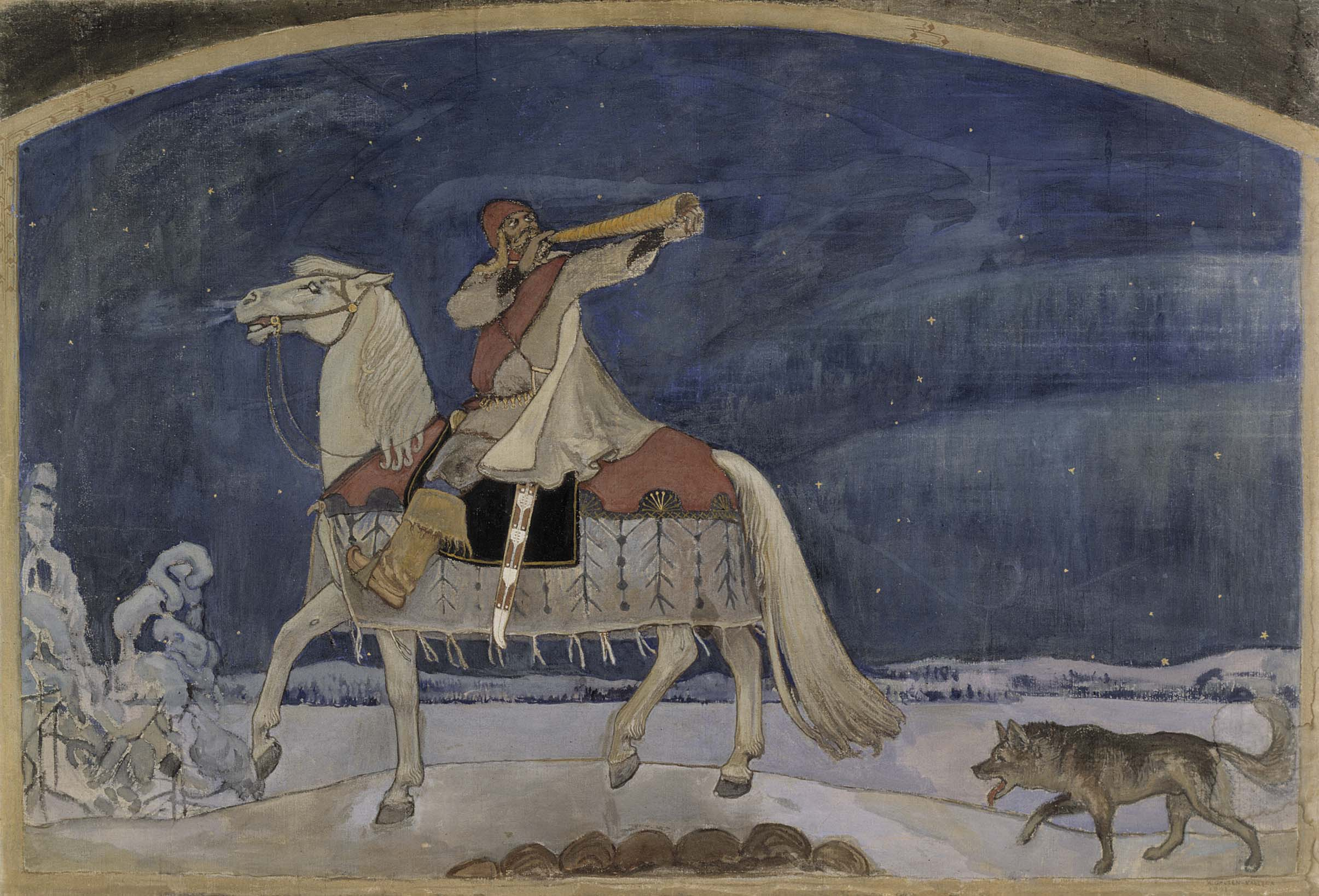
Kullervo Sets Off for War, Akseli Gallen-Kallela, 1901

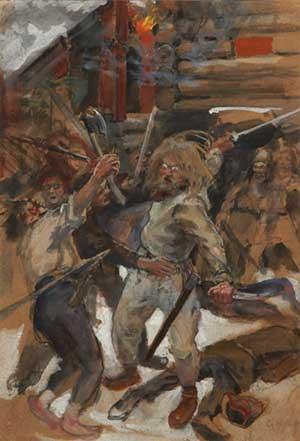
Kullervo as an Avenger by Gallen-Kallela, 1893

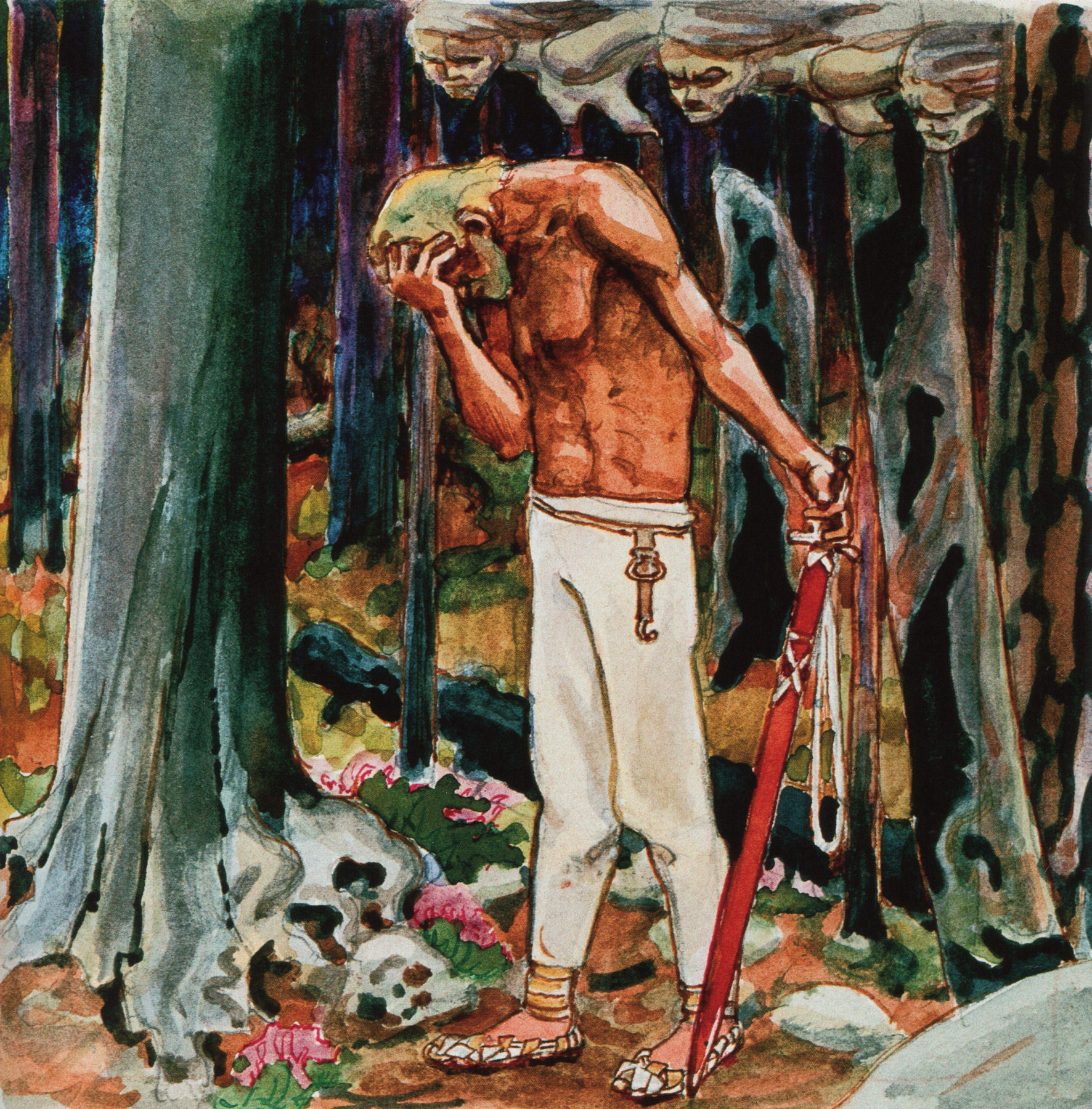
Regretful Kullervo by Gallen-Kallela, 1918

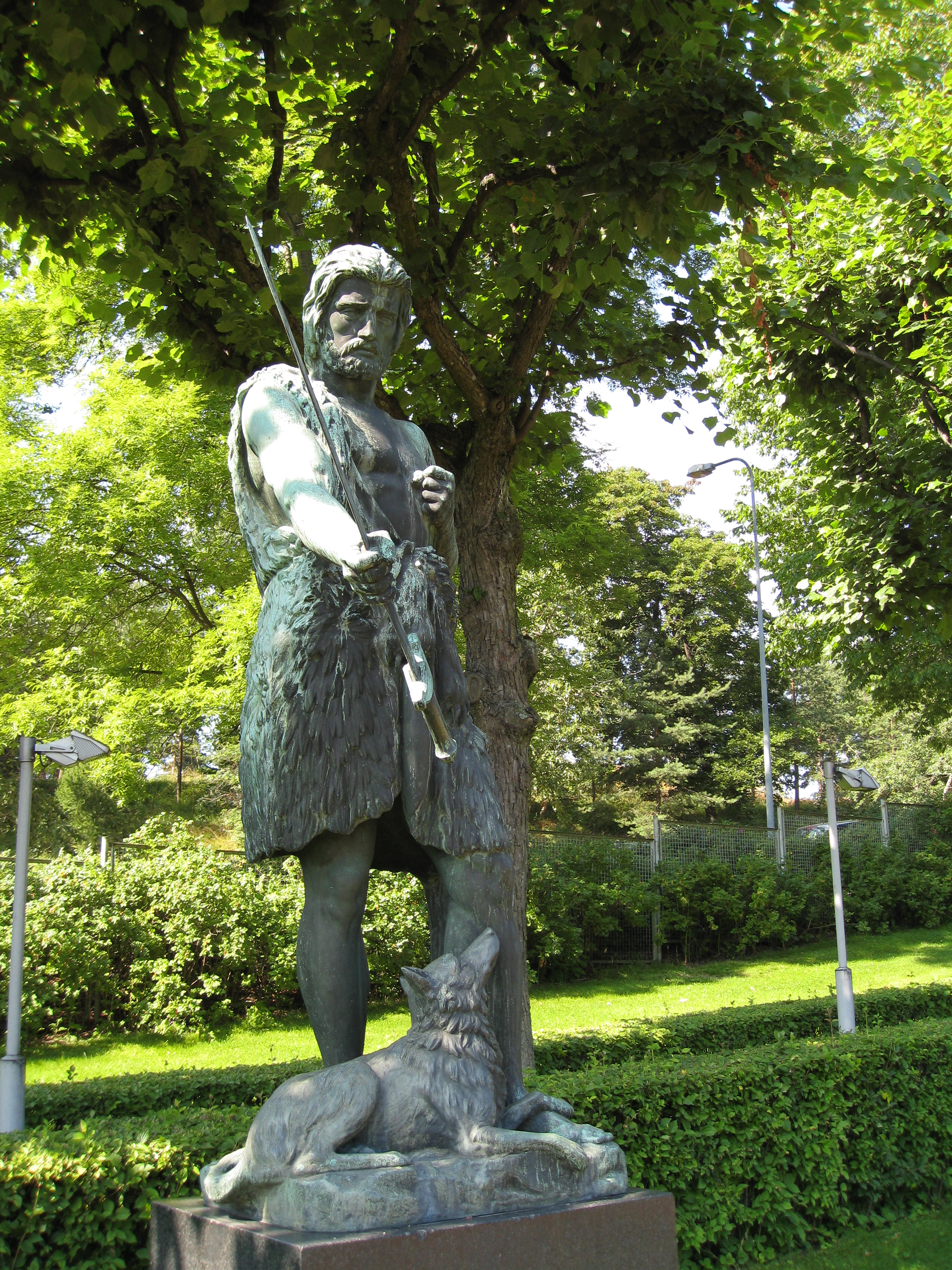
Kullervo Speaks to His Sword, Carl Eneas Sjöstrand, original from 1868, cast in bronze in 1932

== Cantos 37 – 38: Second Ilmarinen Cycle ==
Canto XXXVII. – Ilmarinen's Bride of Gold

Ilmarinen grieves for his lost wife for a long time. When he finally overcomes his grief, he decides to make himself a bride of gold and silver. He toils with his workers at the bellows, but they do not work well; Ilmarinen fails many times until finally he takes control of the bellows himself and produces the bride he desired.

At night Ilmarinen lies down with his golden bride and sleeps. He wakes up to find his bride cold as ice and realizes that this is most unpleasant. He decides to take the bride to Väinämöinen for his enjoyment. Väinämöinen is shocked and annoyed that Ilmarinen would create such an atrocity. He instructs Ilmarinen to destroy it and create nicer things from it or take it to places where gold is revered over life. (Note: FLS: Kolmaskymmenesseitsemäs Runo)

Canto XXXVIII. – Ilmarinen's Fruitless Wooing

Ilmarinen sets out to Pohjola in search for another bride. He is met by Louhi, who asks him for tidings of her daughter. Ilmarinen responds with the sad news and asks for her second daughter; this Louhi refuses.

When Ilmarinen charges into the house and demands the second daughter of Louhi, she herself refuses his advances. He grasps her and drags her to his sledge and sets off for Kalevala. The maiden laments and struggles. She threatens to smash his sledge, but he tells her it is made of iron. She makes several other threats, but Ilmarinen has none of it. The daughter of Louhi continues to insult and annoy Ilmarinen until he decides to rest. As he does so another man makes the maiden laugh. On waking, Ilmarinen is so angered he sings the maiden into a sea gull and continues home alone.

When he returns home he consults Väinämöinen and informs him of Pohjola's prosperity because of the Sampo. He also tells him of the fate of Louhi's second daughter. (Note: FLS: Kolmaskymmeneskahdeksas Runo)

== Cantos 39 – 44: Theft of the Sampo ==
Canto XXXIX. – Expedition Against Pohjola

Väinämöinen says to Ilmarinen that they will go to Pohjola and seize the Sampo, to which Ilmarinen tells him of the secure nature of the Sampo's hiding place and of the nine locks and of its roots deep in the earth. Väinämöinen is not downcast though and says that they will go and recover the Sampo.

Väinämöinen and Ilmarinen debate how to get to Pohjola and decide to go by sea. Ilmarinen forges a new sword for Väinämöinen. The two men set out along the shore on fine horses and on the way hear a weeping. They investigate and find it is a warship lamenting its being stuck in the bay. Väinämöinen consoles the ship and pushes it out to water, and they proceed to Pohjola aboard the mighty warship with Ilmarinen at the oar and Väinämöinen at the tiller.

They pass by the home of Lemminkäinen, who asks to join them on their journey. They agree and the three heroes of the Kalevala sail to Pohjola. (Note: FLS: Kolmaskymmenesyhdeksäs Runo)

Canto XL. – The Pike and The Kantele

Väinämöinen, Ilmarinen, and Lemminkäinen continue in their ship to Pohjola. On their way they are greeted by many maidens.

Lemminkäinen remembers that a great waterfall is in their path and proceeds to pray to the gods to calm the cataract and allow them safe passage. Väinämöinen guides the great ship through the rapids and over the waterfall without a scratch on the vessel. However, the ship runs aground on the back of a giant pike.

Väinämöinen instructs Lemminkäinen to kill the pike, but he fails. Ilmarinen mocks Lemminkäinen, but he himself fails and his sword is broken to pieces. Belittling them both, Väinämöinen plunges his own sword into the fish. He raises it up from the water as it splits apart with the tail sinking. Väinämöinen cuts the headpiece into pieces they then cook to eat. From its jawbone, and from the hair of horse of Hiisi, Väinämöinen fashions a magnificent kantele. After the kantele's construction is complete, Väinämöinen summons a worthy player. Many try to play, but none can do the magnificent instrument justice. (Note: FLS: Neljäskymmenes Runo)

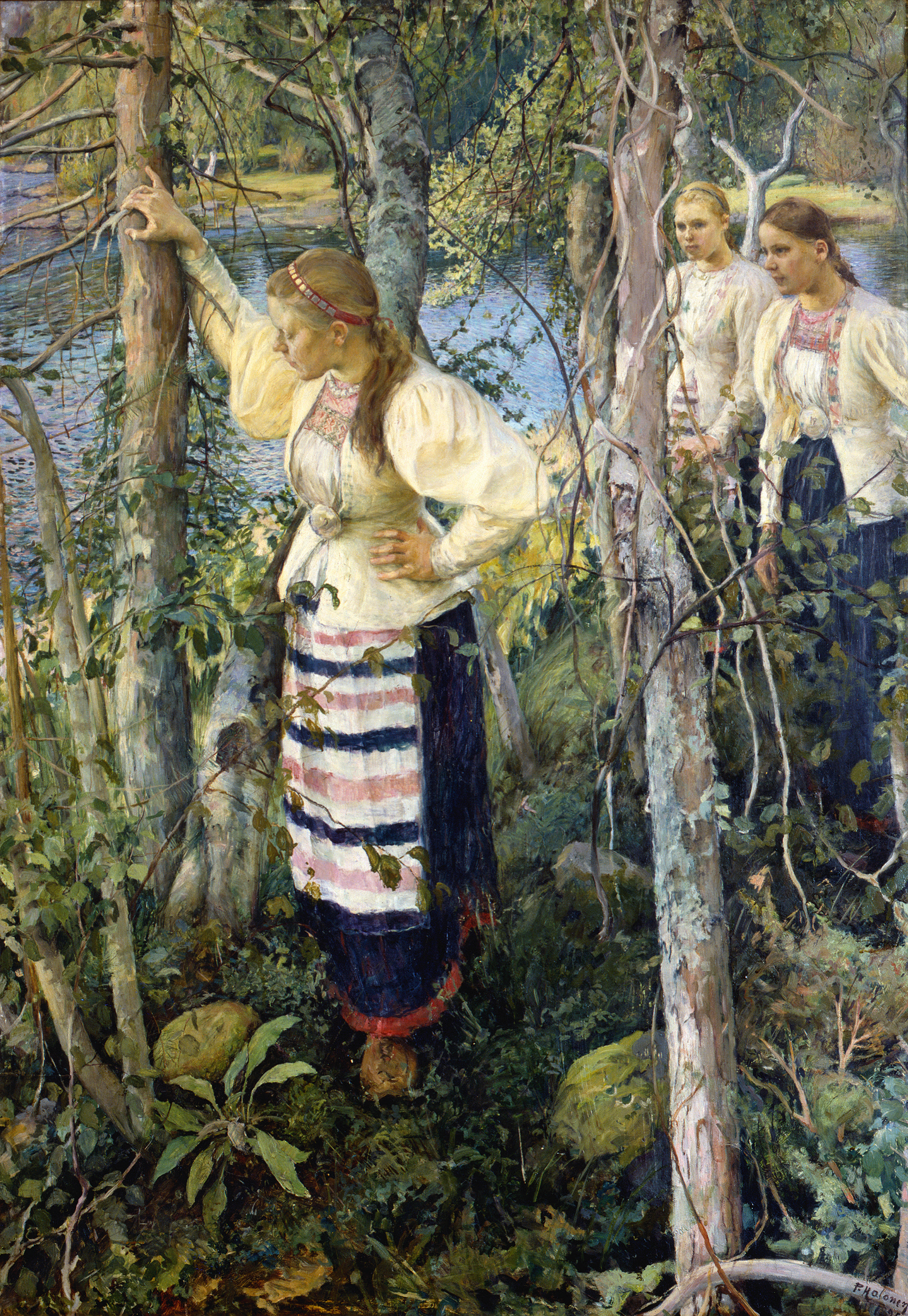
Maidens at the Headlands, Pekka Halonen, 1895 (fi)

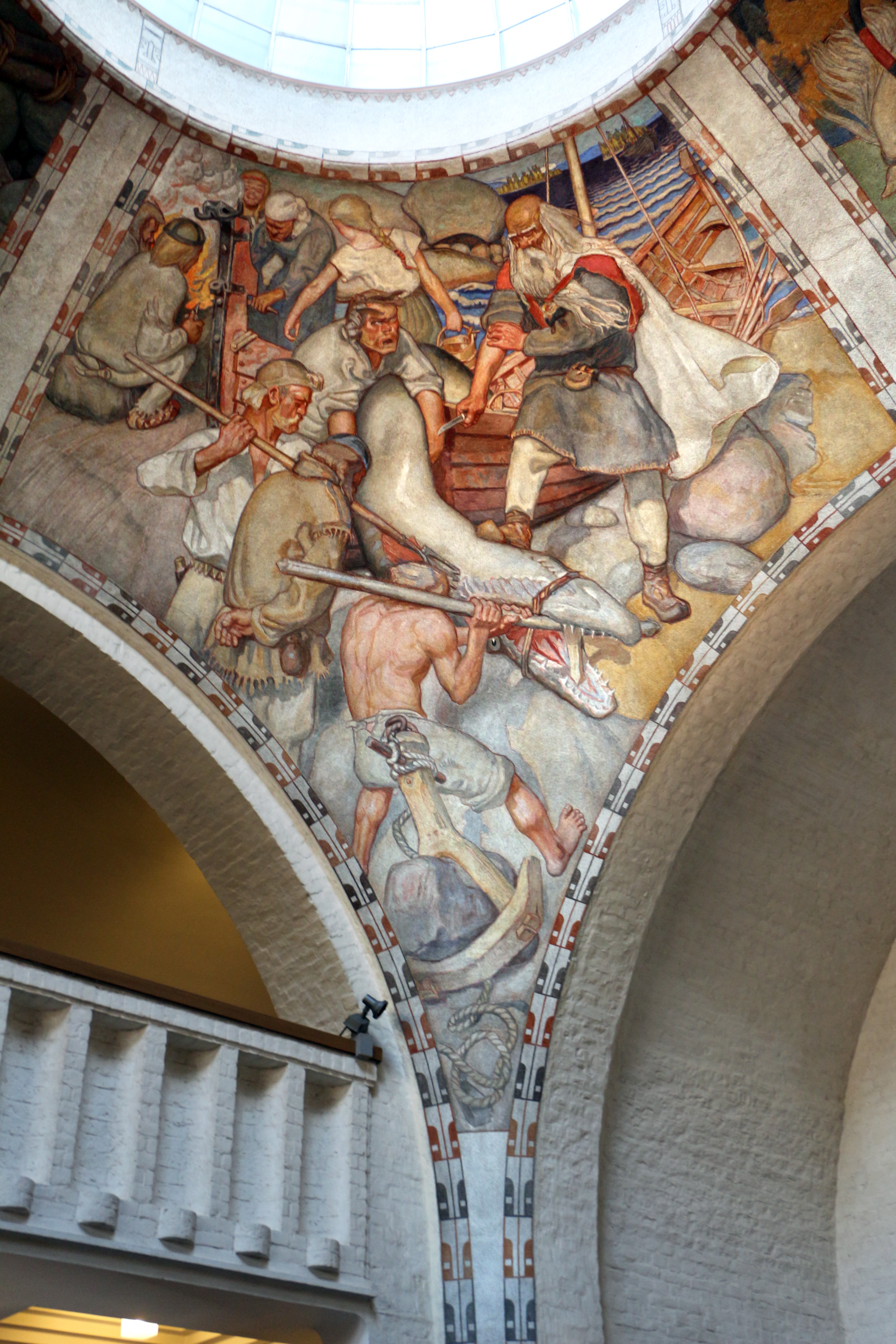
The Great Pike, 1928 fresco by Akseli Gallen-Kallela based on his 1904 painting (at the National Museum of Finland)

Canto XLI. – Väinämöinen's Play

Väinämöinen himself sits down to play the kantele. He calls to all peoples of Northland to listen and revel in his play.

On hearing Väinämöinen's play all the creatures of the world—be they from air, earth, or water—come to hear the beautiful music. Väinämöinen's play is so beautiful even the gods themselves come to hear it.

All of Väinämöinen's audience begin weeping for the music, and soon Väinämöinen himself weeps. His giant tears fall and flow to the water where they become magnificent blue pearls, more wonderful then anything on earth.

Väinämöinen summons a worthy collector for his tear-drops. He calls to a raven, but the bird is unable to gather them; he calls to a duck who is able to gather the pearls and present them to Väinämöinen. (Note: FLS: Neljäskymmenesensimmäinen Runo)

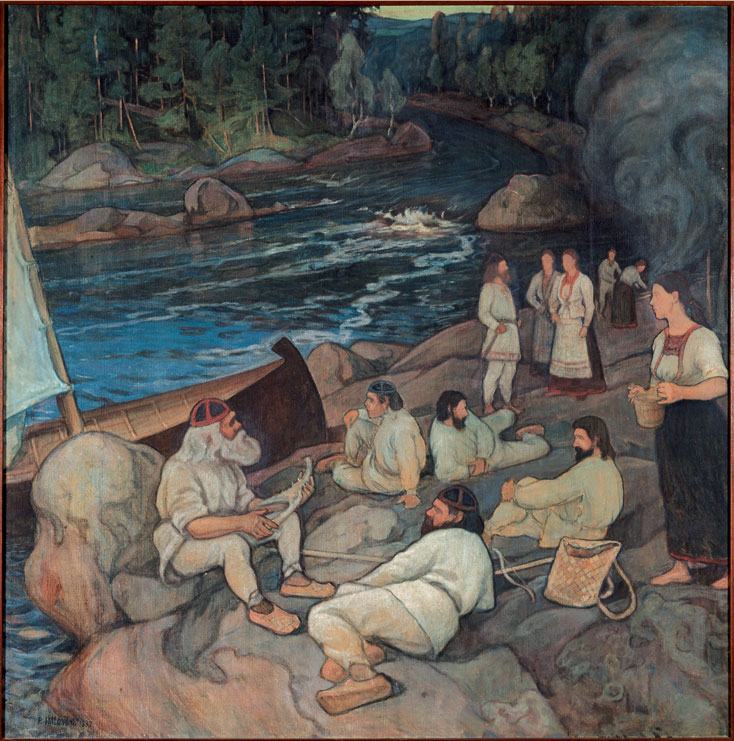
Väinämöinen's Play, Pekka Halonen, 1897

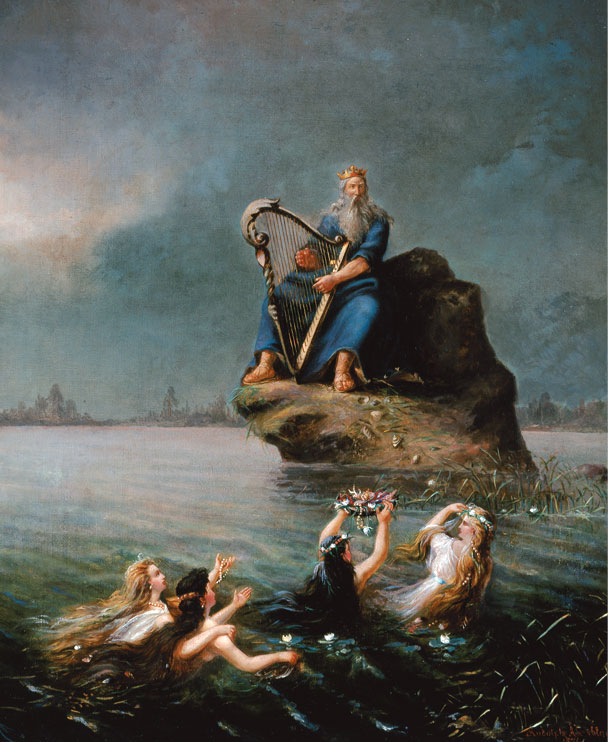
Väinämöinen playing a large harp by Rudolf Åkerblom, 1885

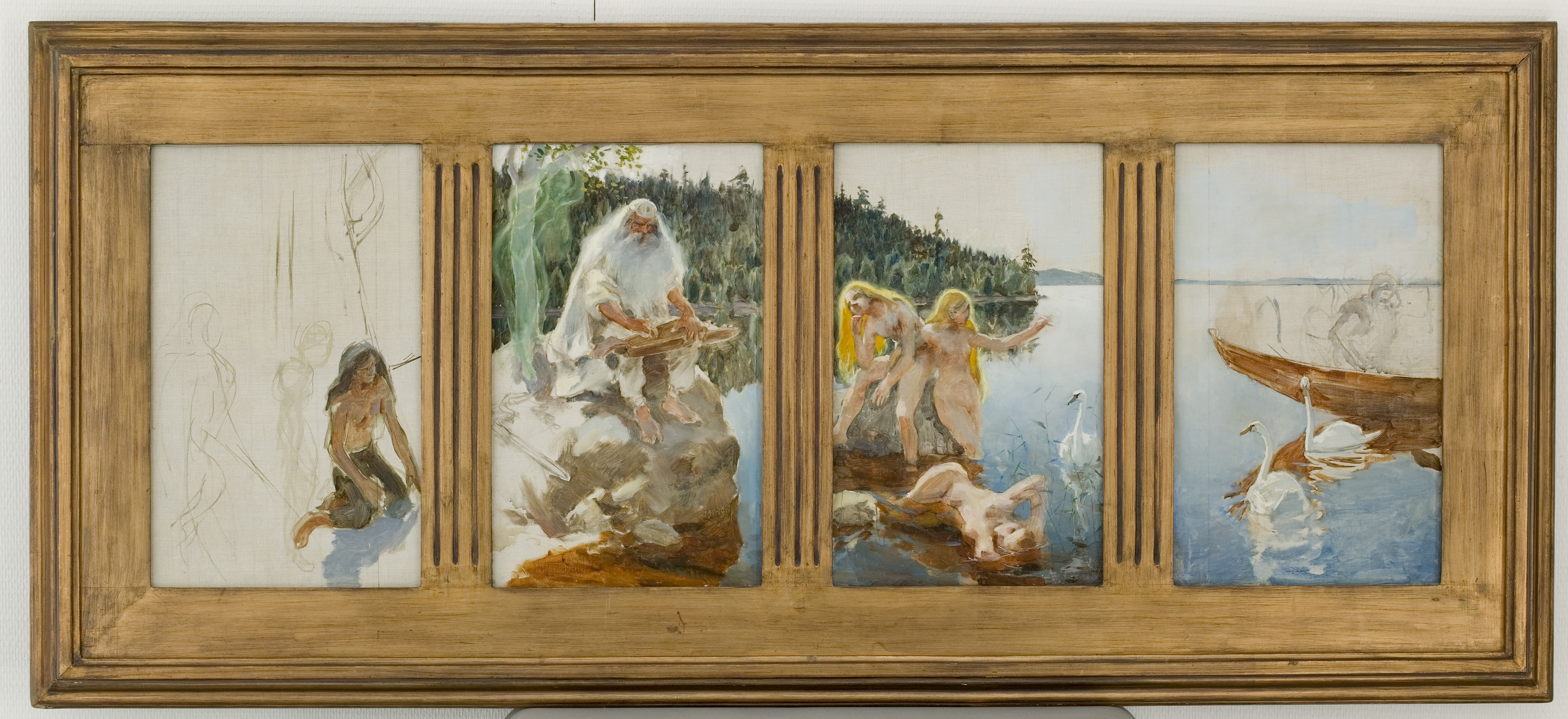
Akseli Gallen-Kallela's 1886 unfinished version

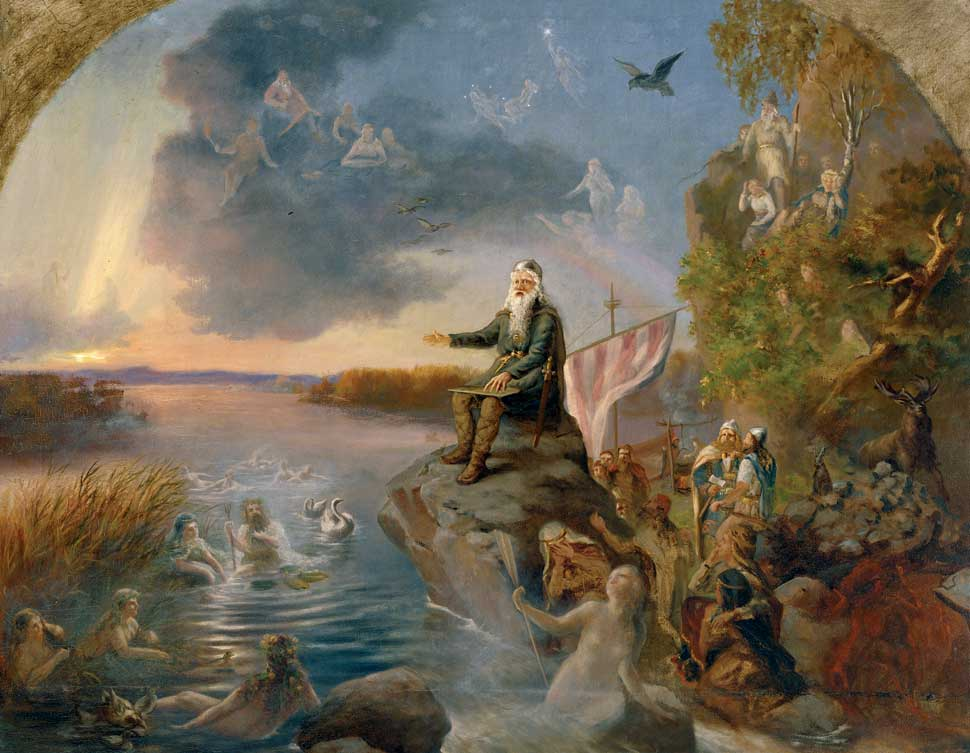
Depicted by Johan Kortman, 1891

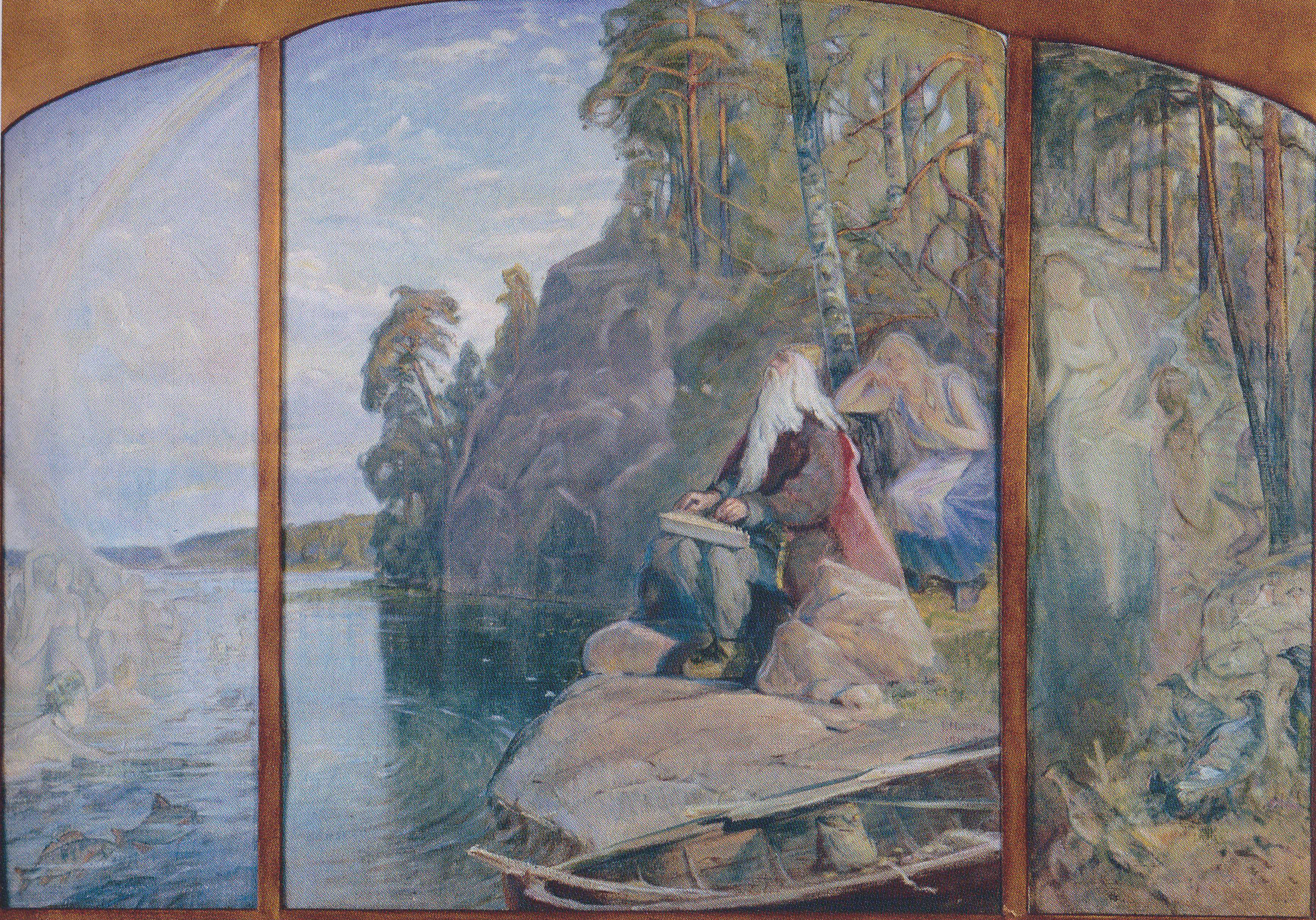
Triptych by Elias Muukka, 1914

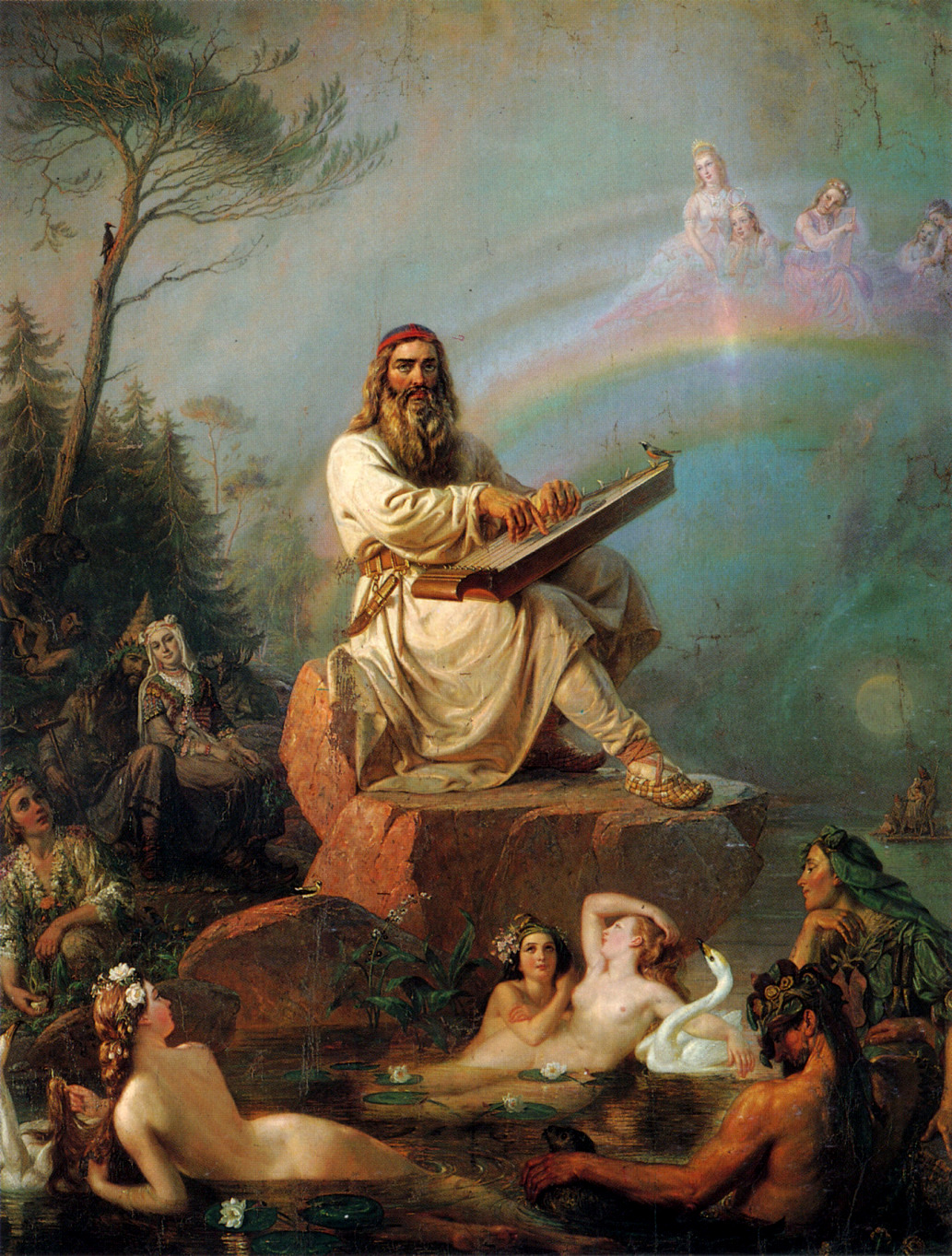
Gigantic, 4-meter tall painting by Robert Wilhelm Ekman, 1866 (fi)

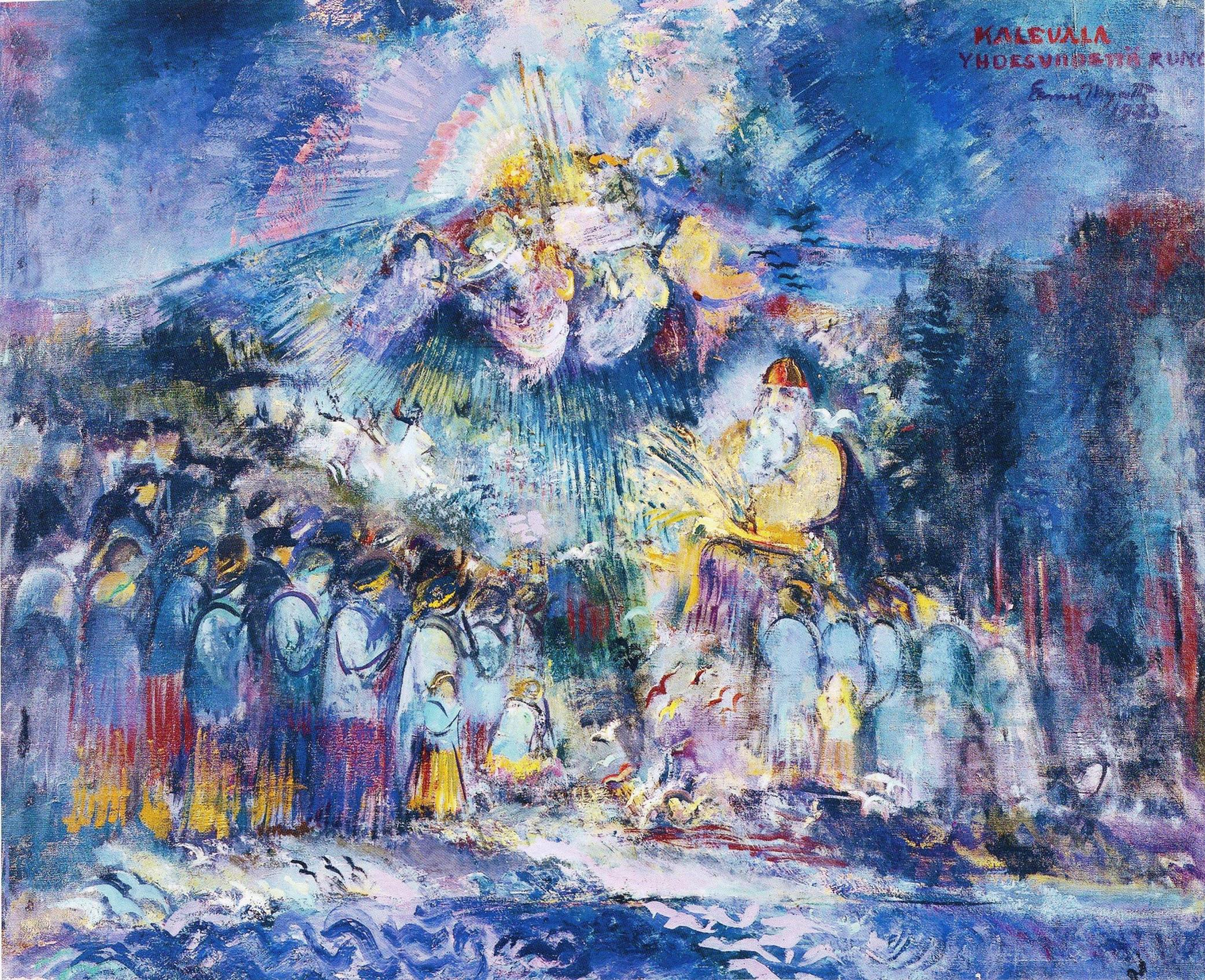
Expressionistic version by Eemu Myntti, 1933

Canto XLII. – Recovery of the Sampo

They land at Pohjola and are met by the hostess Louhi, who asks them why they are there. Väinämöinen tells her that the people of Kalevala wish to have the Sampo. She responds by saying that it cannot be shared among all the heroes and as it brings great prosperity to Pohjola it will not be surrendered. Väinämöinen then says they will take it forcefully, which angers Louhi and she summons soldiers to vanquish Väinämöinen and his people. Väinämöinen plays his kantele, which pacifies the people of Pohjola and causes them to fall into a deep sleep.

Väinämöinen's group then searches for the Sampo. They reach the copper mountain, and Ilmarinen anoints the hinges and bolts of the chamber and the bolts unlatch and the doors fly open. Lemminkäinen enters the chamber and with swelling ego praises himself until he sees the beauteous Sampo. He tries with all his might to move it, but the roots of the mountain have firmly secured its place. Lemminkäinen then captures and harnesses a great ox, which he uses to plough the roots and free the Sampo.

Väinämöinen and the heroes carry the Sampo back to their ship and proceed to leave Pohjola and return home. They agree to leave the Sampo in safety on a fir-covered island.

Väinämöinen prays for a safe, swift, and easy journey back to Kalevala. Lemminkäinen longs for food and song, but Väinämöinen warns him that feasting and singing will prolong the journey. Lemminkäinen nevertheless sings his songs, but his singing is so foul that a crane flies away in pain, flies over Pohjola, and wakes the people of the Northland with its crying.

Louhi wakes and checks her domain frantically and, finding nothing awry, she then checks the copper mountain and finds the Sampo missing. She calls to the sea-fog to cover the waters and to Iku-Turso to devour the heroes of Kalevala and return the Sampo. She calls to Ukko to raise a giant storm and blow them off course.

Väinämöinen and the others are caught in the thick fog for days until Väinämöinen in desperation cleaves the sea with his magic sword, releasing them from their captivity.

Suddenly Iku-Turso comes toward them in great anger. Ilmarinen and Lemminkäinen are both filled with dread but Väinämöinen seizes the monster and asks him why he approaches in anger. He refuses to answer and Väinämöinen asks him again. Iku-Turso tells Väinämöinen of his instructions and promises to leave if he is released.

A short time passes and Ukko raises a great wind against the heroes, causing the sea to fume with white waves and Väinämöinen to lose his pike kantele, which Väinämöinen laments heavily. Ilmarinen weeps and believes all is lost, however Väinämöinen recovers his composure and warns against weeping over the past. He commands the gods to stop the waves and calm the sea. Lemminkäinen calls to the birds to help save the sinking ship, and with the aid of the men of the vessel and Väinämöinen's magic the ship is saved. (Note: FLS: Neljäskymmenestoinen Runo)

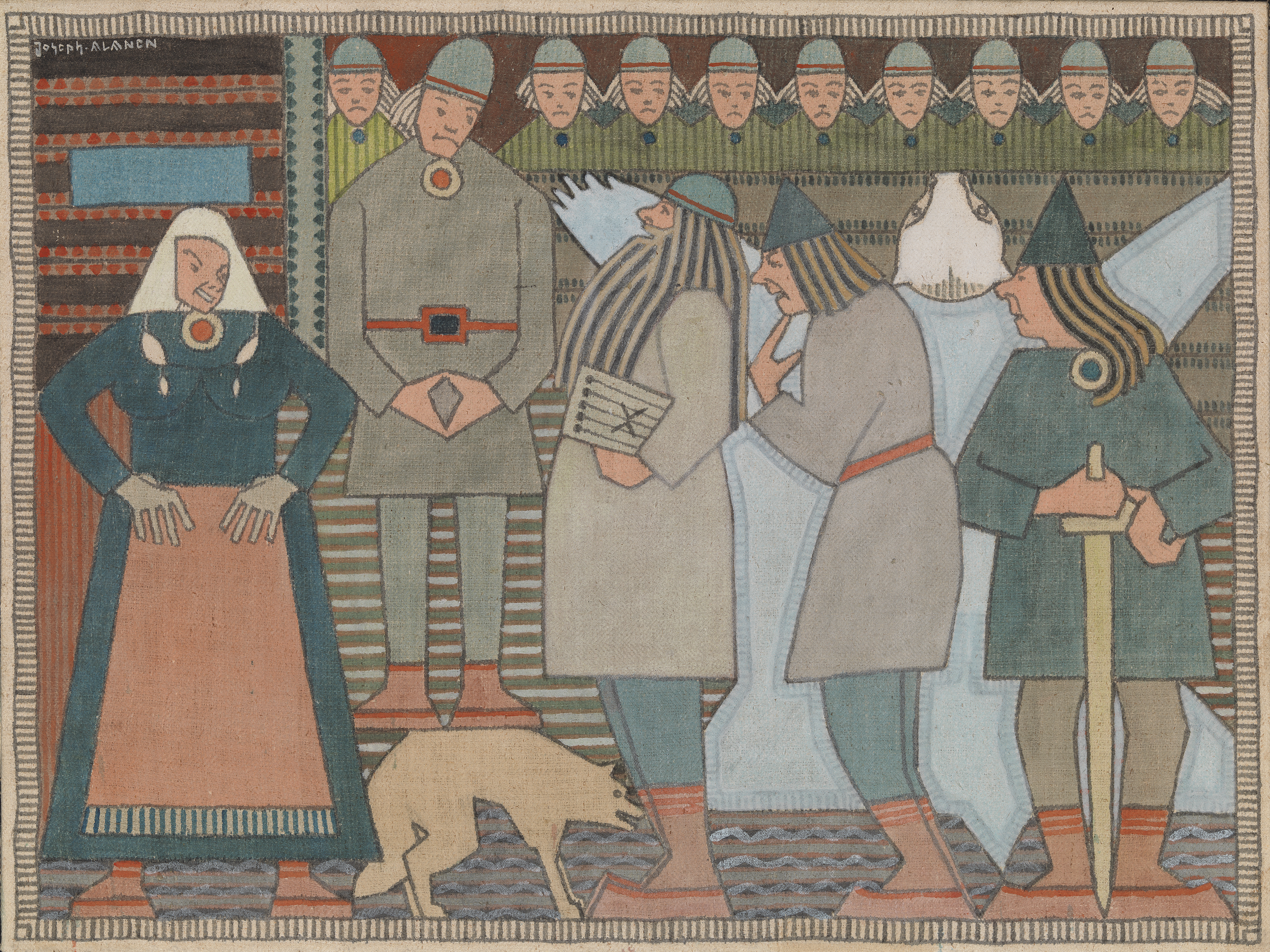
Arrival of Väinämöinen, Ilmarinen and Lemminkäinen at Pohjola, tempera by Joseph Alanen

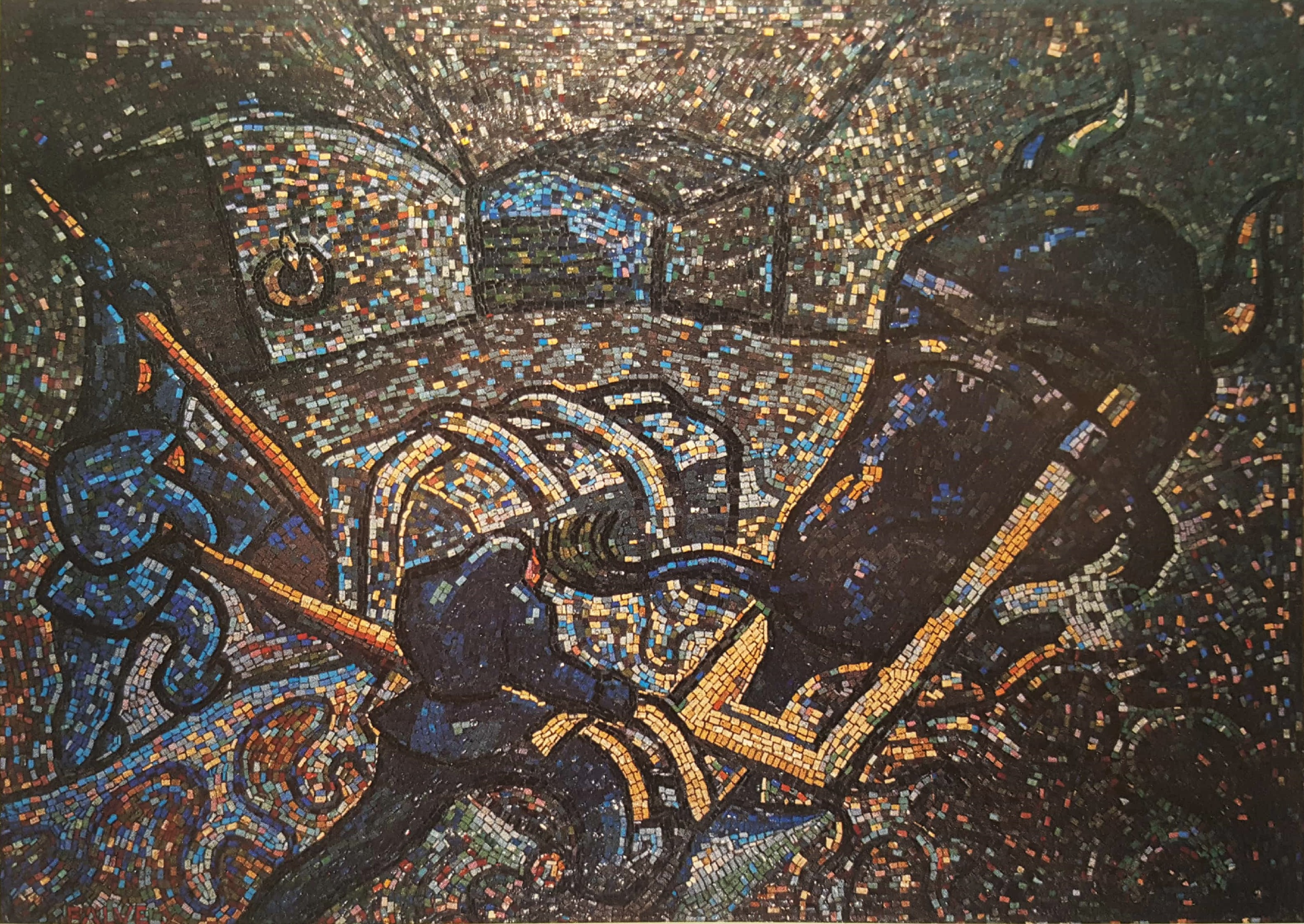
The Retrieval of Sampo from the Stone Hill of Pohjola, where Lemminkäinen ploughs the roots with a Pohjola bull, mosaic by Veikko Aaltona, 1940

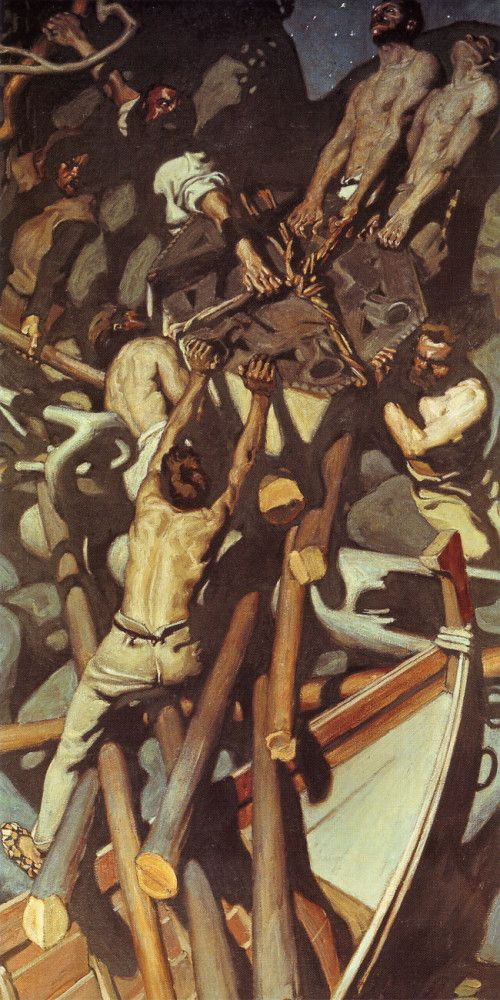
The Theft of the Sampo, Akseli Gallen-Kallela, 1897 (fi)

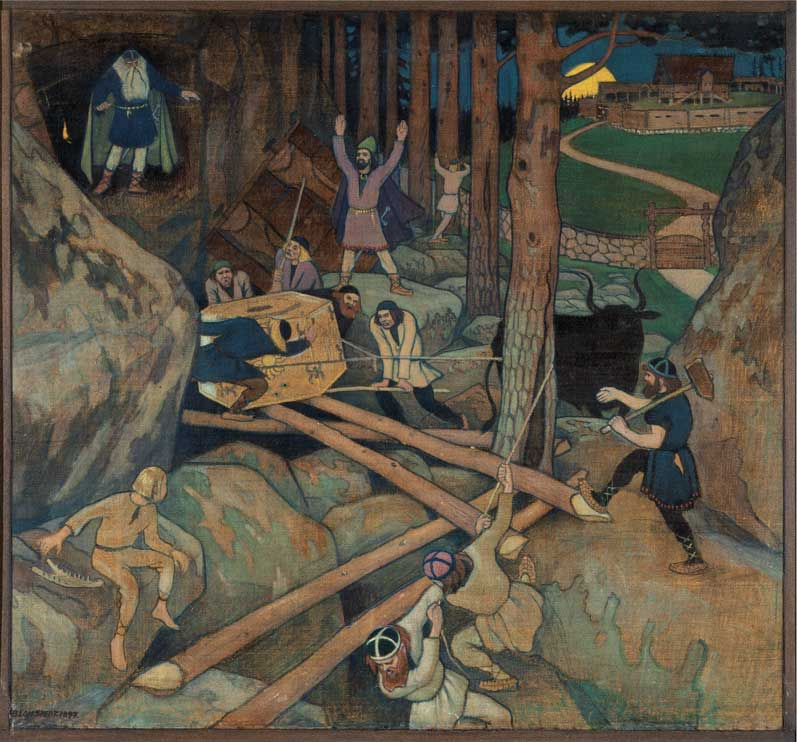
The Theft of the Sampo, Väinö Blomstedt, 1897

Canto XLIII. – Loss of the Sampo

Louhi, filled with rage, prepares her army for battle. She loads a great warship and sets sail to find and take the Sampo.

Väinämöinen asks Lemminkäinen to climb the mast of the ship and check for anything out of the ordinary. Lemminkäinen sees nothing but a dark horizon behind the ship to the north. Väinämöinen asks again for Lemminkäinen to check the situation. He reports of a vast forest to the north and an island to the south. Väinämöinen says there is no forest to the north and asks Lemminkäinen to check again. This time he spies a ship making chase. Väinämöinen orders Ilmarinen and Lemminkäinen to row with the other oarsmen as hard as they can to escape their pursuers, but to no avail.

Väinämöinen utters words of magic with reagents thrown into the sea to create a shoal. The ship of Pohjola crashes into the shoal, breaking the ship apart. Louhi however changes her form into a giant eagle, with scythes as the nails of her talons and the remains of the ship as her wings and tail. A large number of her men climb on her back as she takes flight and continues the pursuit of Väinämöinen and his heroes.

Louhi lands on the highest mast of Väinämöinen's ship. Ilmarinen prays to Ukko for help and protection while Väinämöinen asks Louhi once again if she will share the Sampo. Again she refuses. She then attacks and swoops down to steal the Sampo in her talons, but Lemminkäinen draws his sword and injures her. She scolds him for breaking his promise to his mother not to fight. Väinämöinen, fearing the worst may happen, tears the rudder from the ship and strikes Louhi, striking her army from her back and causing her to fall. She takes one more grab at the Sampo and drops it into the sea where it sinks and breaks into pieces.

Louhi, still furious, warns Väinämöinen that she will steal the sun and moon from the sky and send nine diseases to his people. Väinämöinen answers that she cannot do this as only a god has that ability. Louhi flies away weeping, to return to Pohjola. Väinämöinen rejoices when he returns home. He takes the pieces of the Sampo that washed up on his beaches and prays to Ukko to always protect his people from evil and famine and disease and to protect them from Louhi and her armies. (Note: FLS: Neljäskymmeneskolmas Runo)

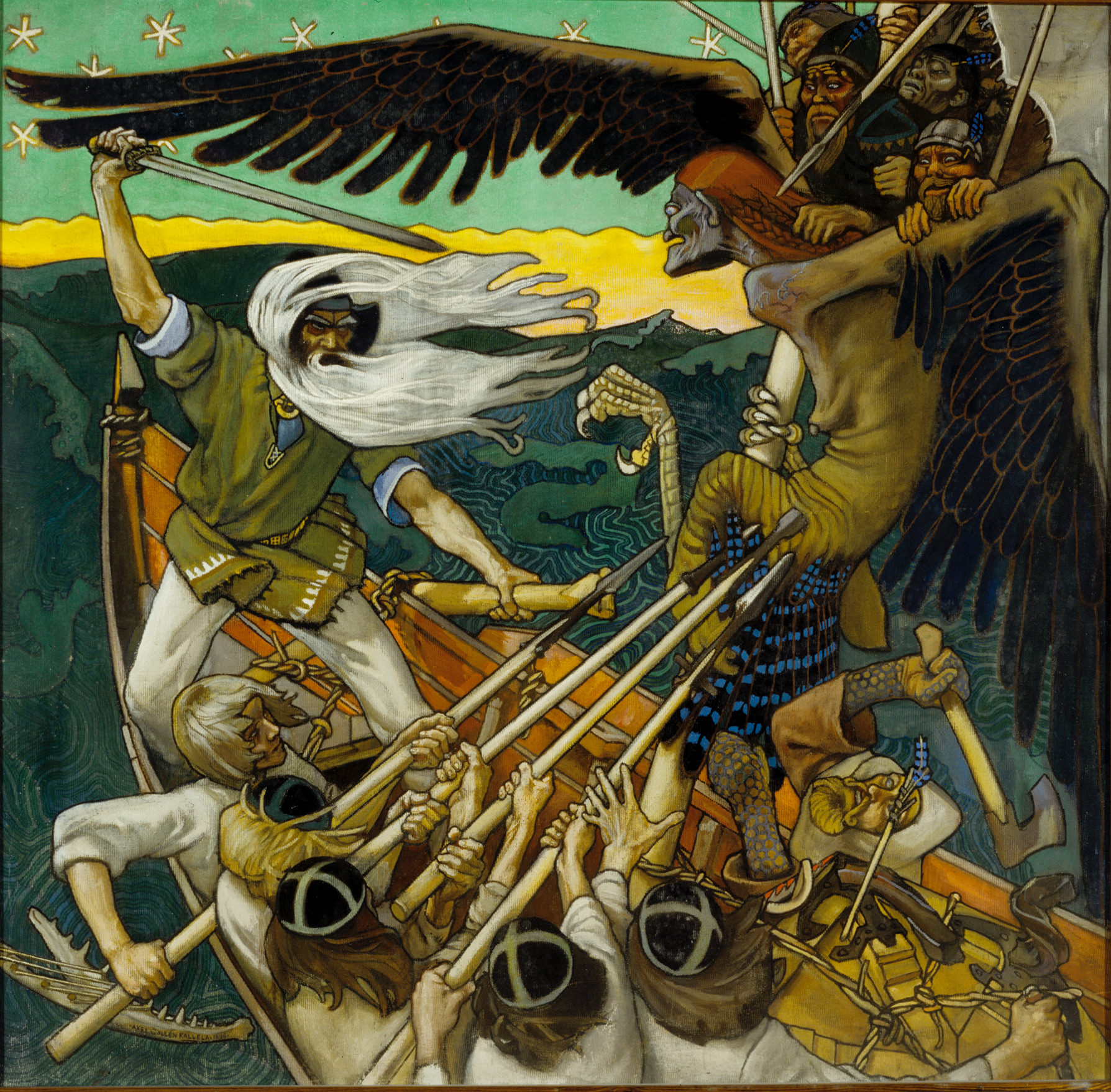
The Defense of the Sampo, Akseli Gallen-Kallela, 1896

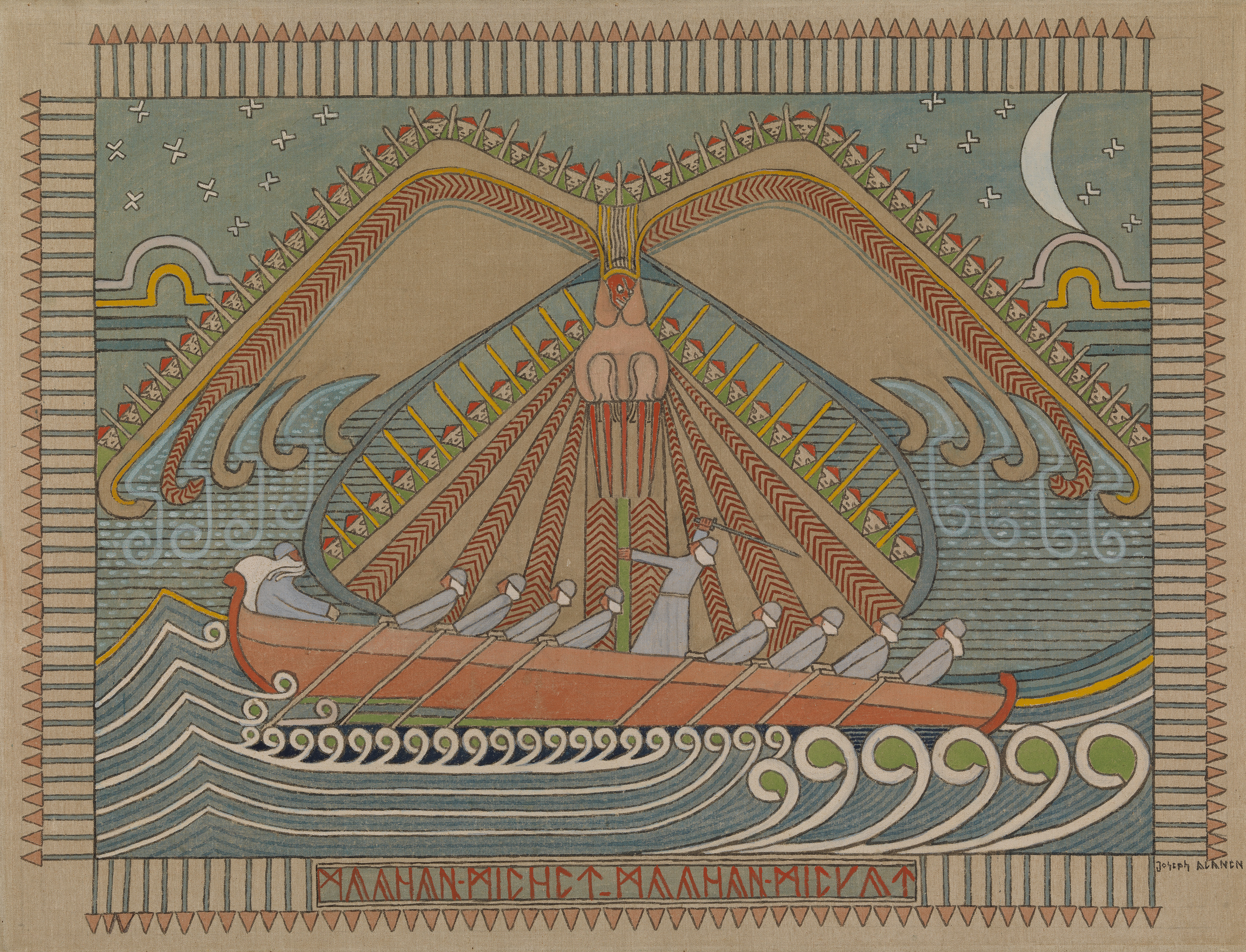
The Defence of the Sampo, Joseph Alanen, 1910–1912

Canto XLIV. – Birth of the Second Kantele

Väinämöinen wishes to sing again but laments that his kantele is lost to the kingdom of Vellamo. He goes to Ilmarinen and asks him to forge a giant rake to dredge the seabed. Väinämöinen goes to a boat shed and addresses the younger of the two boats housed there. He commands the young boat to go to the place where his kantele was lost. He begins to search for his lost kantele, but to no avail.

Väinämöinen makes his way home and meets a weeping birch tree. He asks why it is weeping, and the birch says that it is sad because it is treated badly by the people. It is stripped of its bark and leaves and never feels safe to settle. Väinämöinen proceeds to make a new kantele from the wood of the sacred birch and strings of golden hair from a joyful maiden.

Väinämöinen plays the new kantele, which sounds so beautiful it causes the people of Kalevala to leave whatever they are doing and come to hear, old and young, male and female. They all listen and weep with joy. The same happens with the folk of Northland. The music is so fantastic even the animals themselves come to hear. Väinämöinen plays for three solid days. (Note: FLS: Neljäskymmenesneljäs Runo)

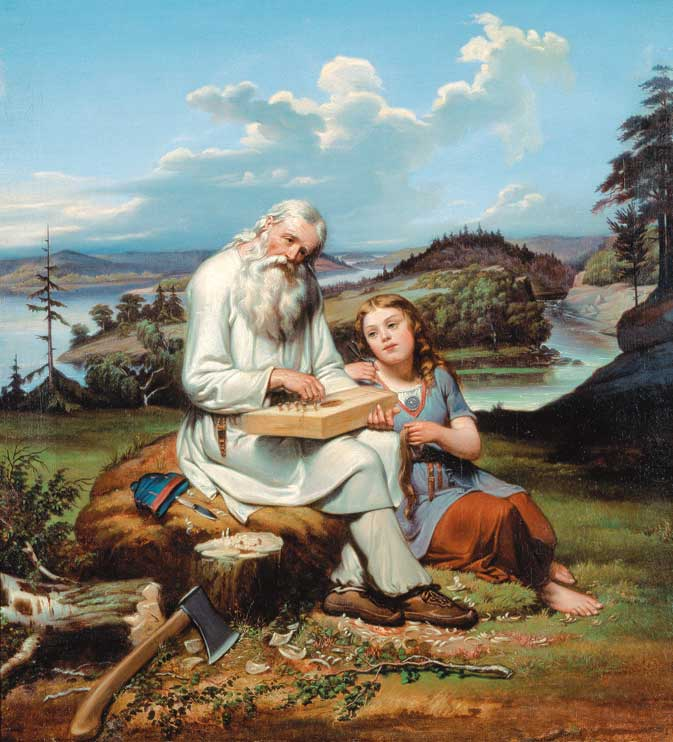
Väinämöinen Attaches Strings to his Kantele, Johan Zacharias Blackstadius, 1851

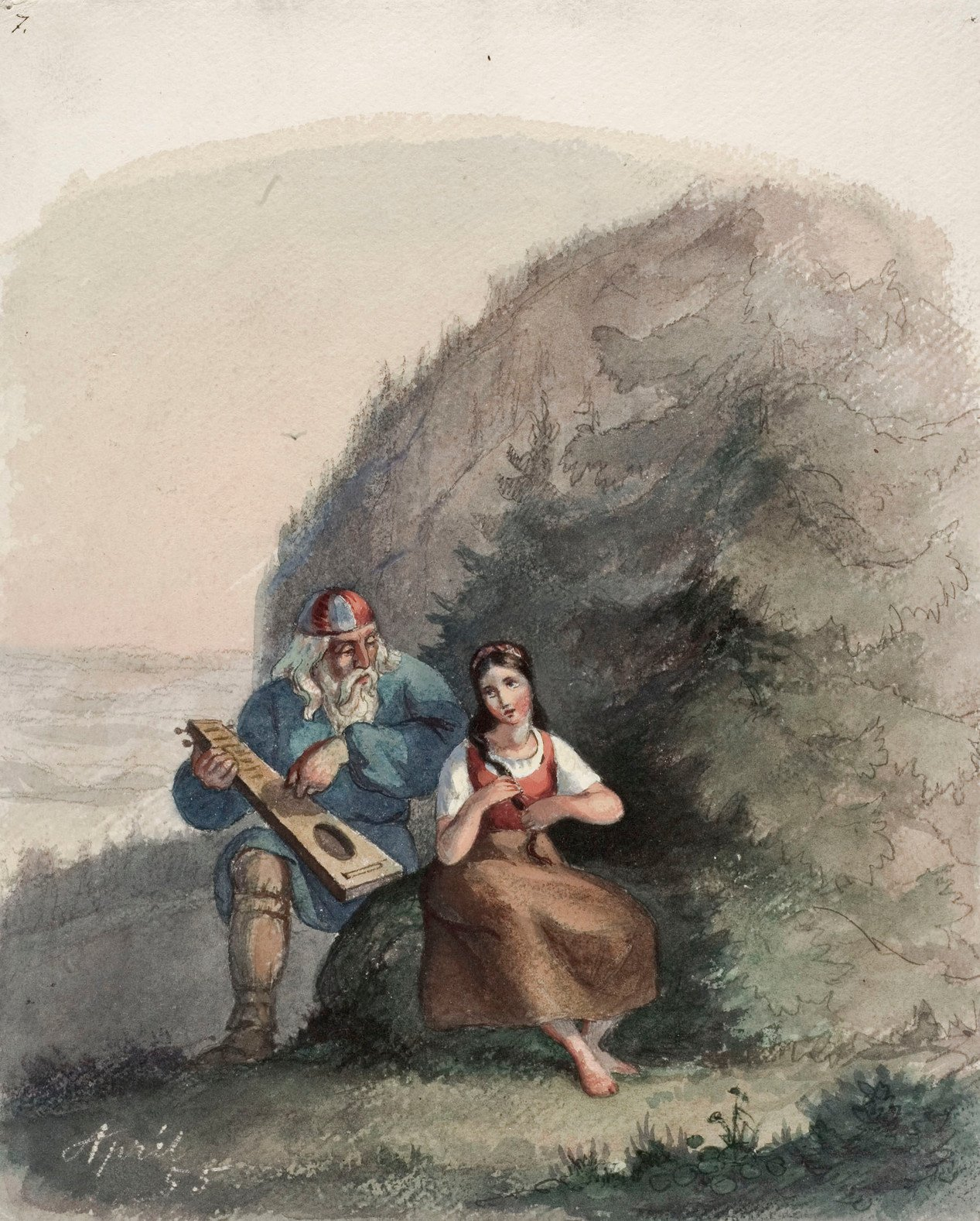
Väinämöinen Stringing His Kantele, Anders Ekman, 1855

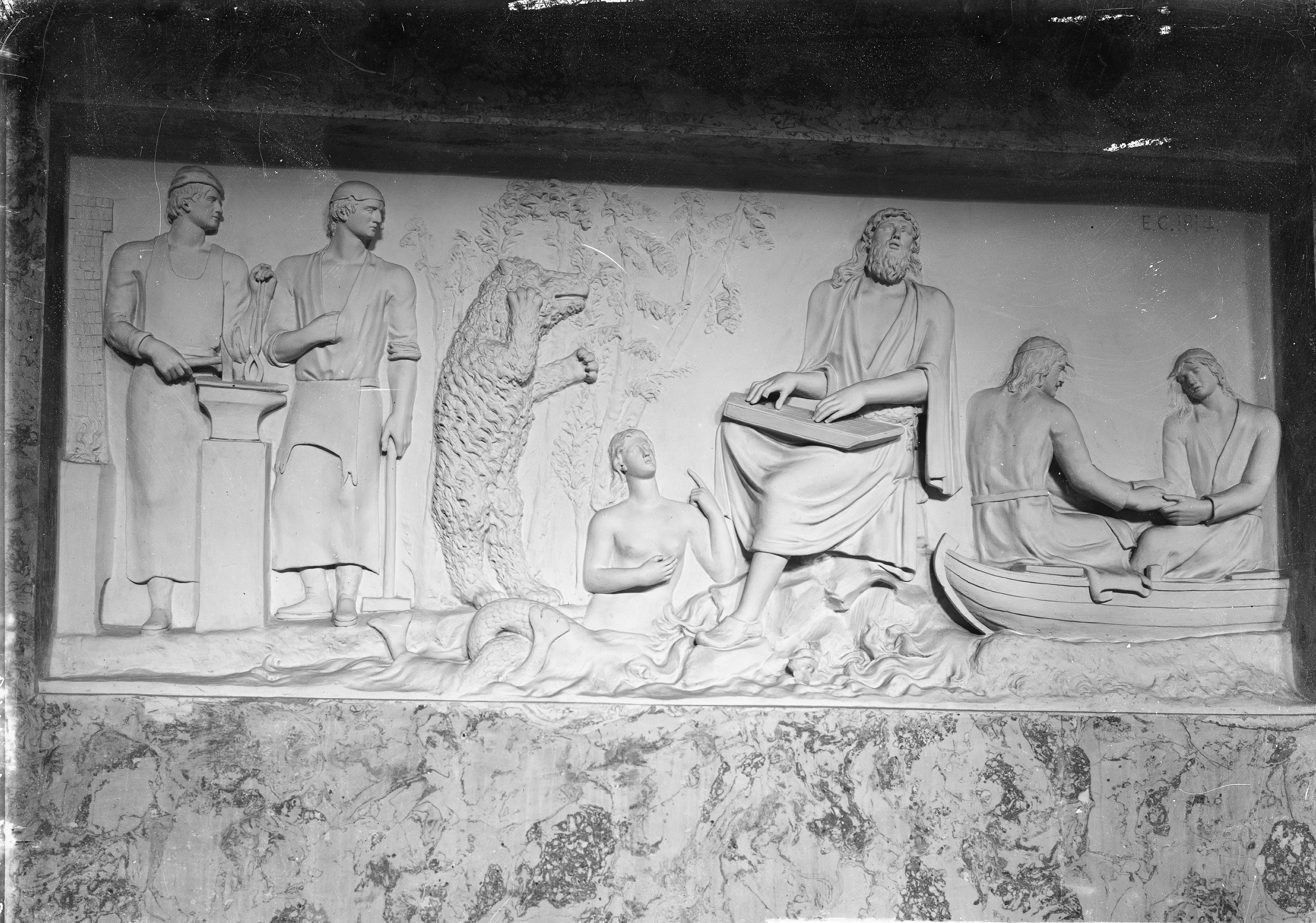
Väinämöinen Plays Kantele, an 1814 relief by Erik Cainberg that is considered to be the first visual depiction of Väinämöinen

== Cantos 45 – 49: Louhi's Revenge on Kalevala ==
Canto XLV. – Louhi's Pestilence on Kalevala

Louhi, growing angry at the prosperity of Kalevala, calls to Loviatar, one of Tuoni's daughters, to bring upon the people of Kalevala disease and pestilence. Loviatar births her children of disease and tends to them:

Then Loviatar named them all in order,

As we do with all our children,

Thus proclaimed what she had wrought:

Cramps and Colic, Gout and Rickets,

Were the first four sons she named:

Cancer, Boil and Scab made seven,

And the eighth she named the Plague.

Louhi banishes the children of Loviatar to Kalevala, causing the people to fall sick. Väinämöinen comes to his people's aid. He fires up healing saunas, sends prayers and magic words to Ukko to deliver his people from peril, and uses healing balms on the ill. Väinämöinen then calls to Ukko to send a healing balm by rain and successfully saves his people from destruction. (Note: FLS: Neljäskymmenesviides Runo)

Canto XLVI. – Otso, the Bear.

Louhi, on hearing the eradication of the disease, sends the great bear Otso to destroy the cattle and people of Kalevala.

Väinämöinen instructs Ilmarinen to build him a spear to kill the bear. He heads out on the hunt, offering spoken charms to the lord of the forest and to the bear. Väinämöinen approaches the bear, which slips from its resting place and is killed in the fall. Väinämöinen comforts the bear. On his return a feast is held in the halls of Kalevala. Väinämöinen tells of the origin of the bear and sings songs wishing for peace and prosperity for his people. (Note: FLS: Neljäskymmeneskuudes Runo)

Canto XLVII. – Robbery of the Sun, Moon, and Fire

Väinämöinen's singing brings the sun and moon to the earth in joy. However, Louhi steals them away and conceals them in Pohjola; she then steals the fire from the homes of Kalevala.

Ukko, confused as to the lack of sun and moon, strikes up a new fire, conceals it in a golden purse and tasks a maiden of the air to nurture it, however she fails and the new fire falls to the earth and is spotted by Väinämöinen and Ilmarinen, they go to hunt for it. They meet Ilmatar and she tells them that the fire has caused many a mischief and was finally swallowed by a fish in Lake Alue. Väinämöinen and Ilmarinen lay nets for the Fire-fish to no avail. (Note: FLS: Neljäskymmenesseitsemäs Runo)

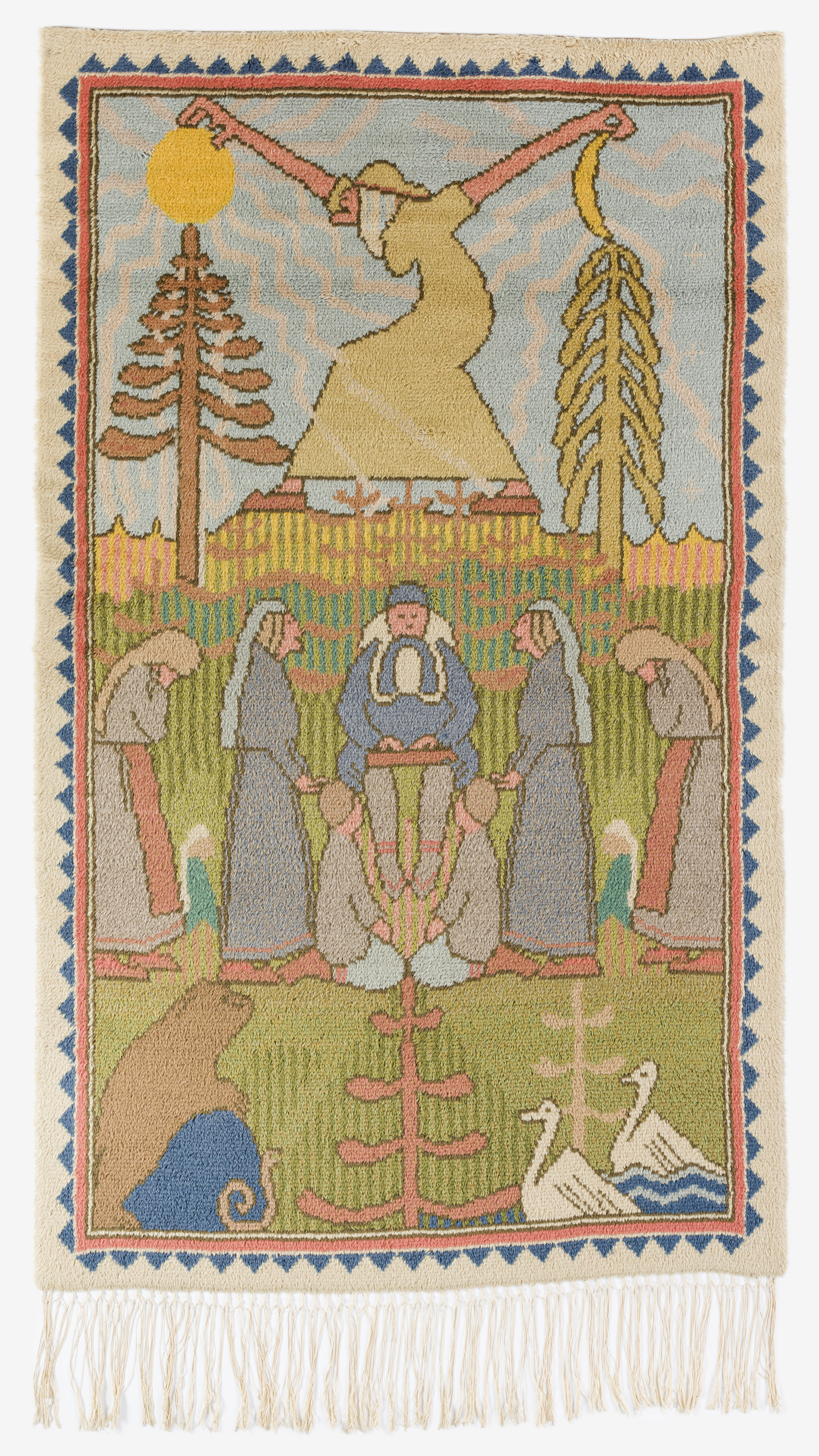
Rya of Louhi stealing the sun and the moon, Joseph Alanen, c. 1909

Canto XLVIII. – Capture of the Fire-fish

Väinämöinen asks his people to make him flaxen net to catch the fire-fish. His people go to work ploughing the land and sowing the seeds. When the flax grows, they harvest, thresh, and weave it into threads. They then prepare the fishing net. When the net is complete, the young folk go to catch the fish, but they do not succeed, so Väinämöinen and Ilmarinen go to fish for the pike themselves. Their attempts fail, and they enlarge the net and try again. On their second failing Väinämöinen calls to Vellamo and Ahto for assistance.

A man of very small stature rises from the water and offers his help to drive the fire-fish to the nets, which Väinämöinen happily accepts. Väinämöinen draws his net in and discovers many fish have been caught, including the fire-fish. Väinämöinen dares not touch the fire-fish and wonders how he will recover the fire. Panu, the son of the Sun, hears and tells Väinämöinen he will open up the fish. He calls to the heavens for a magical fish knife, which he is supplied with.

Panu cuts into the pike and finds the fire. Väinämöinen wonders how to return it to Kalevala. Suddenly the fire grows angry and flies over the lake, burning Väinämöinen and Ilmarinen during its escape. The fire scorches many lands including Pohjola and Kalevala. Väinämöinen tracks the fire and finds it hiding. He offers a charm to coax the fire into obedience and places it in a tinderbox and returns it to his people.

Ilmarinen tries to soothe his burnt fingers by placing them in the water, but this does not help. He calls to the children of the cold dark north to bring him icy slush and to Ukko to bring snow and ice to help him soothe his pains. In time Ilmarinen attains his former health and vigour. (Note: FLS: Neljäskymmeneskahdeksas Runo)

Canto XLIX. – Restoration of the Sun and Moon

Even though the fire has been restored to Kalevala, the animals start to die and the people grow weak because of the lack of sun and moon. One day Ilmarinen is asked to forge another sun and moon, which he agrees to do, but Väinämöinen tells him it is fruitless. Ilmarinen continues to forge the false sun and moon and when they are complete mounts them high in trees but they fail to shine.

Väinämöinen cuts chips from an alder tree to divine the location of the sun and moon. His divination tells him they are locked away in the mountains of Pohjola. Väinämöinen sets off to recover them. He gets within sight of the gates of Pohjola and calls for a boat to carry him across the river, but nobody hears him, so he makes a brushwood fire and lets the smoke drift into the heavens. Louhi sends a messenger to bring her news of the origin of the smoke. Väinämöinen asks the messenger to bring him a boat, but the messenger tells him to swim across the river himself. At this Väinämöinen turns himself into a pike and swims across the river.

Väinämöinen makes his way to the halls of Pohjola and is met by armed men who ask him his intentions, he tells them that he is here to recover the sun and moon. The men of Pohjola and Väinämöinen engage in combat and Väinämöinen is victorious, lopping the heads off the men like turnip roots.

Väinämöinen runs toward the mountain prison of the sun and moon and finds an enormous stone atop a rock with the light of the sun shining out of it. He cleaves the stone in three and discovers serpents drinking ale. He kills them, but when he tries to free the sun and moon he finds his magic lacking, so he returns home and tells of his adventure and his inability to rescue the sun and moon.

Väinämöinen goes to Ilmarinen and asks him to make spears, axes, and keys. Louhi, at the loss of her men, senses her peril. She takes the form of an eagle and talks to Ilmarinen. He tells her of his making implements to imprison her and render her in iron bondage for eternity. Louhi grows fearful and flies back to Pohjola. She lets free the sun and moon and releases them to the sky. Louhi then takes the form of a dove and returns to Kalevala to speak with Ilmarinen again. The Louhi-dove tells Ilmarinen that the sun and moon are now free. Ilmarinen goes to investigate and he sees that it is indeed true, and he tells Väinämöinen.

Väinämöinen is joyful at the sight of the sun and moon and pleads with them to stay where they are and continue to illuminate and nourish his people for eternity. (Note: FLS: Neljäskymmenesyhdeksäs Runo)

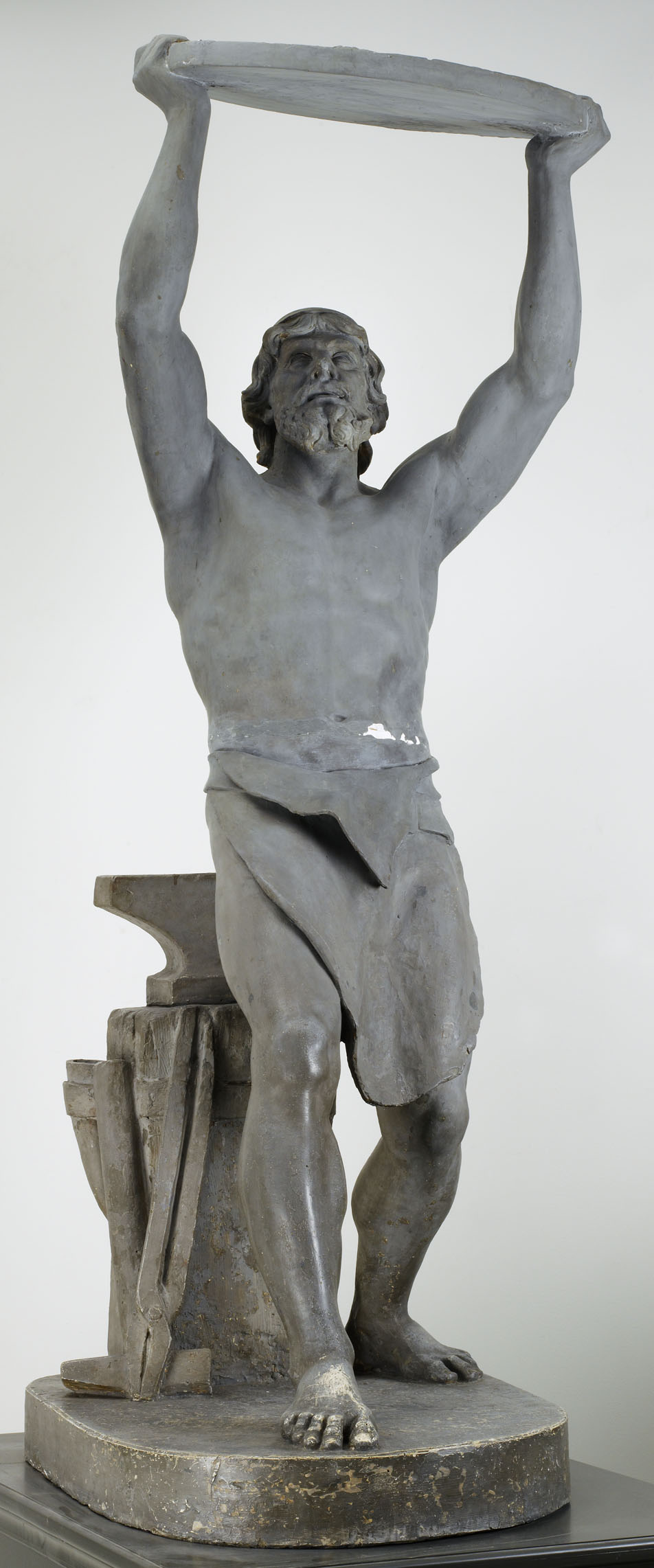
Ilmarinen Forging the Moon, Walter Runeberg, 1866

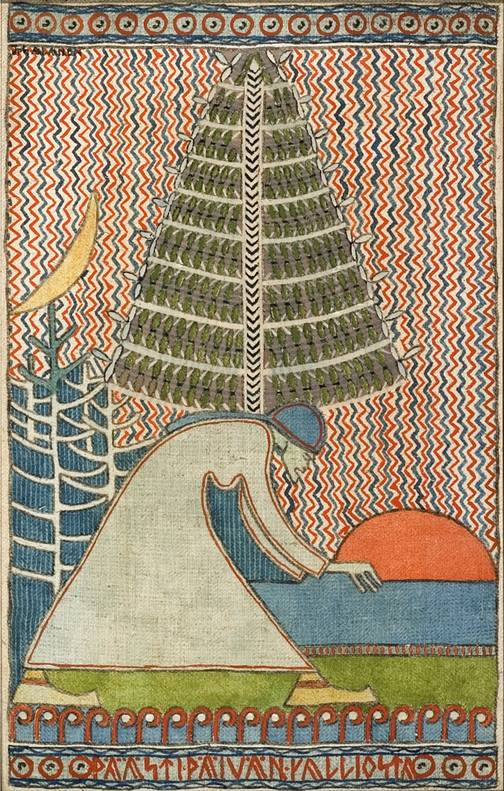
Let the Sun from Bedrock by Joseph Alanen

== Canto 50: Marjatta ==
Canto L. – Marjatta

Marjatta lives a life of respectability and virtue. One day, when she is shepherding her flock, she laments her maidenhood and wishes for a husband. She hears a cowberry crying that no one would pluck it, and she reaches for the berry and it places itself in her mouth and is eaten.

Marjatta grows pregnant and hangs around the house. Her parents wonder what is wrong. The time comes for Marjatta to give birth and she pleads with her parents to give her a place to go and rest and bathe, but she is met with disdain and anger.

Marjatta goes to her trusty maid-servant, Piltti, to seek her some place she can rest and give birth to her child. Piltti goes to the house of Ruotus, but he is insulting and his wife only offers a cold old stable for her. Marjatta goes seeking the stable on her own and when her birth begins prays to Ukko for assistance and protection.

On arrival at the stable Marjatta asks the horse to keep her warm and supply her with steam for a bath. The child is born and cared for well, but one day the child vanishes and Marjatta weeps uncontrollably. She goes in search of her child and asks a star and the moon for assistance, but they offer no advice. Finally the sun tells her that the child is in the swamp and Marjatta recovers him.

The child was to be baptised by Virokannas. Virokannas refuses until the child is proven worthy, however Väinämöinen tells him that the child is not and advises the child be killed. On this the child speaks openly to Väinämöinen and chastises him for his rash judgement and former foul deeds. Virokannas baptises him the rightful ruler of Karelia.

Väinämöinen grows angry and recognises that he is weakening and his influence and importance failing, so he sings up a magic boat and sails away from Kalevala, with these parting words and his magic, songs and sacred kantele as a gift to his noble people.

"May the time pass quickly o'er us,

One day passes, comes another,

And again shall I be needed.

Men will look for me, and miss me,

To construct another Sampo,

And another harp to make me,

Make another moon for gleaming,

And another sun for shining.

When the sun and moon are absent,

In the air no joy remaineth." (Note: FLS: Viideskymmenes Runo)

Epilogue

The poem ends with a sung farewell by the singers.

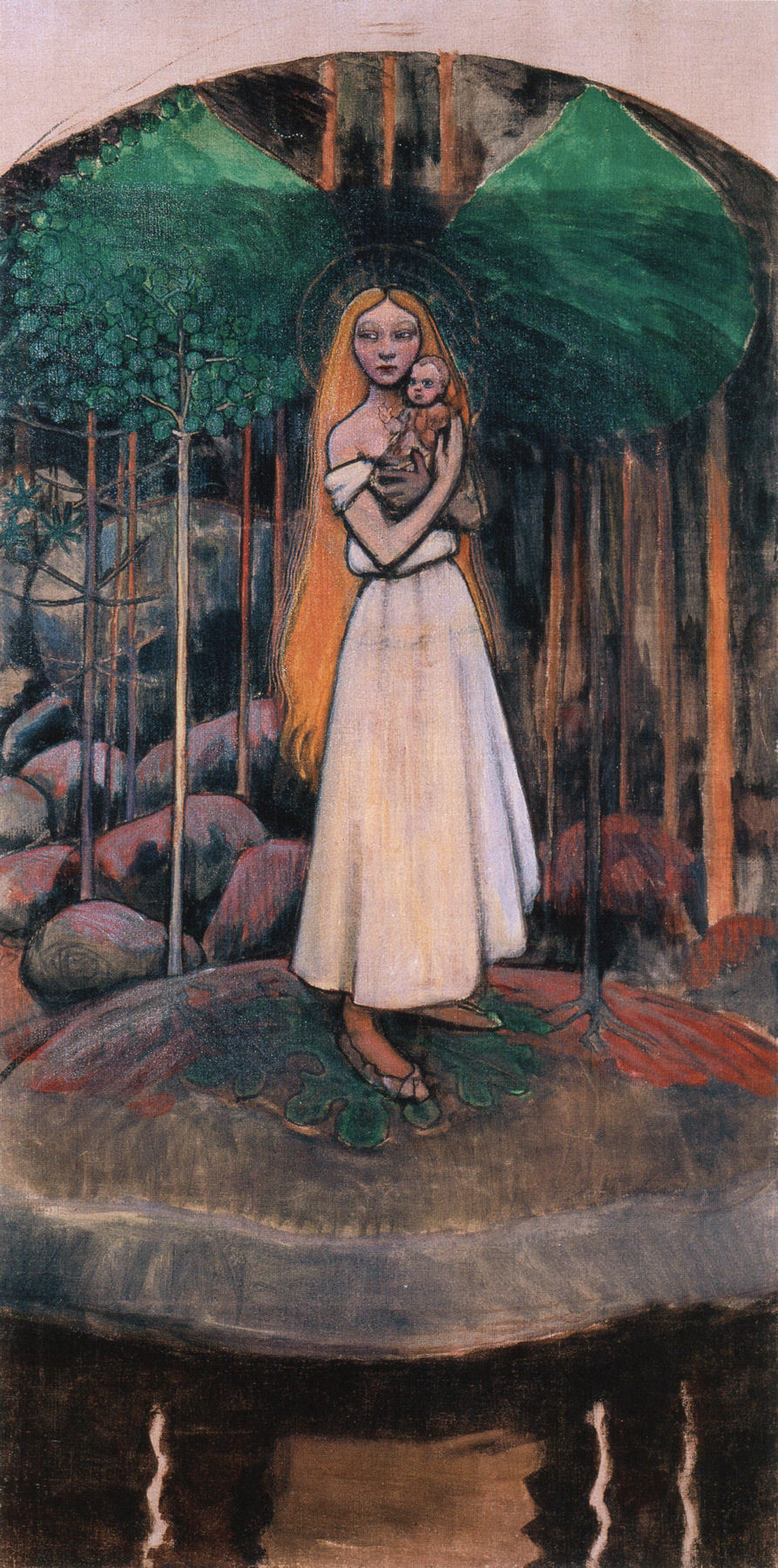
Marjatta and the Christ Child, Akseli Gallen-Kallela, 1895–1896

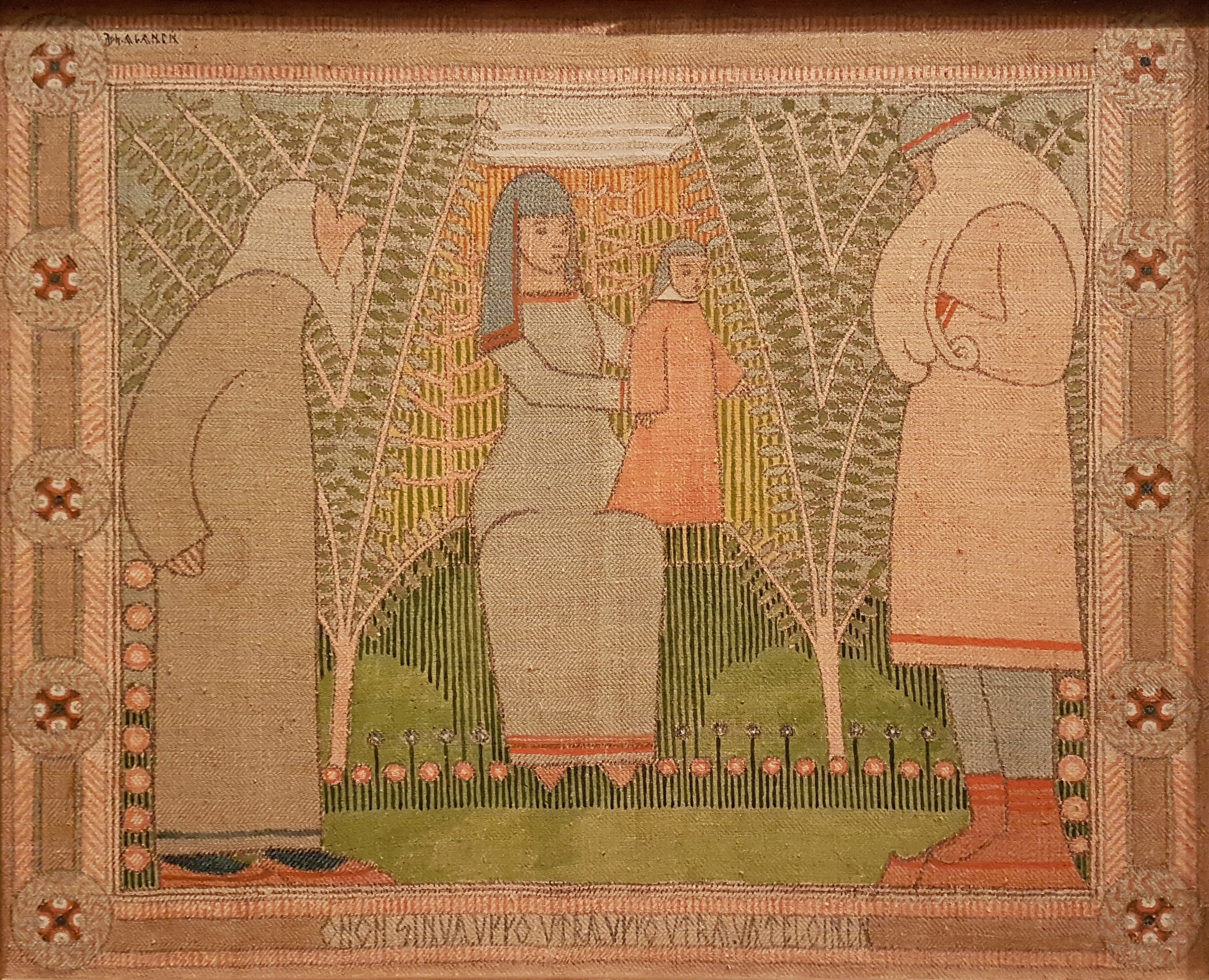
Väinämöinen and Kiesus, Joseph Alanen, 1908–1910

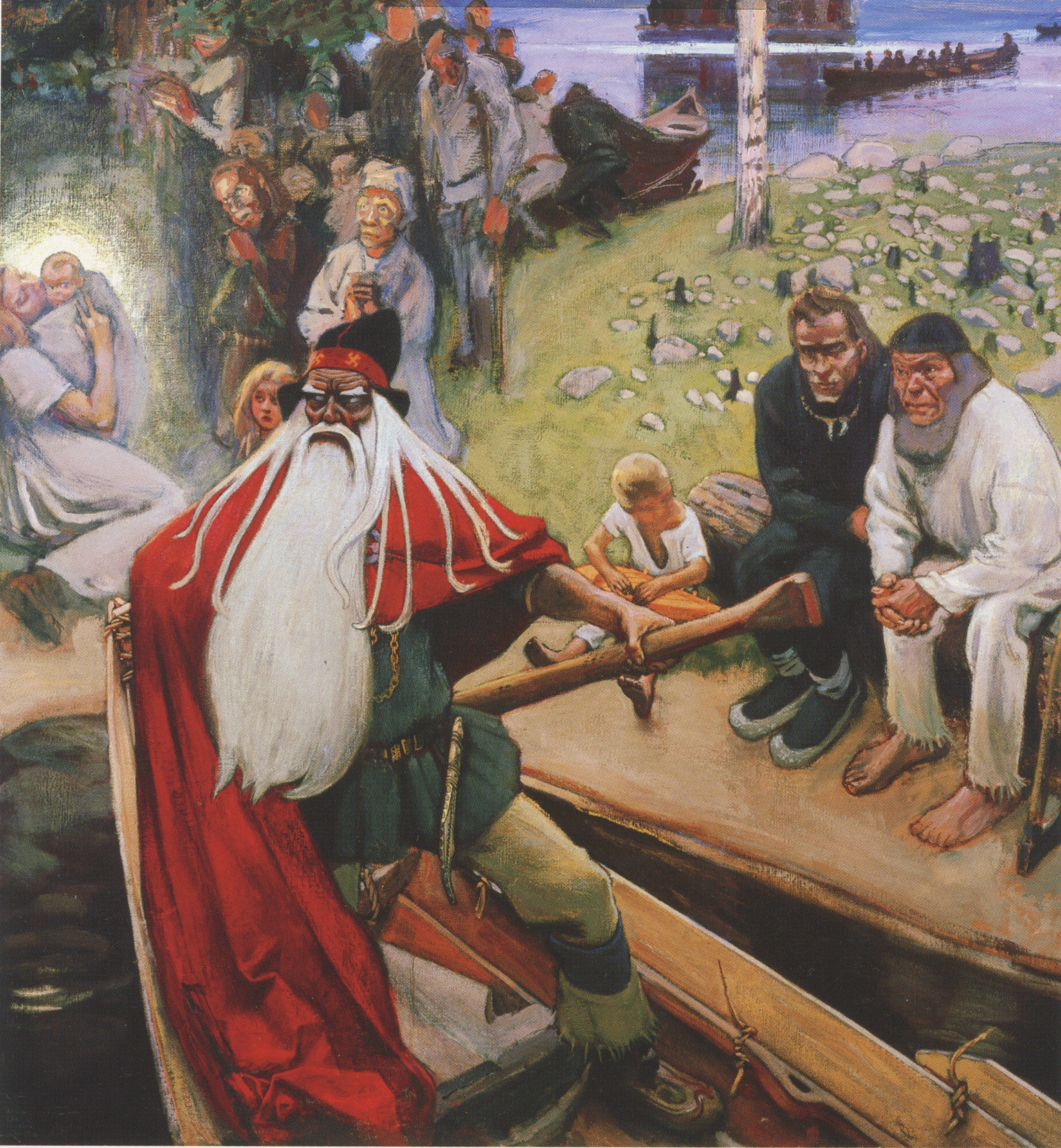
The Departure of Väinämöinen by Gallen-Kallela, 1906 (fi)

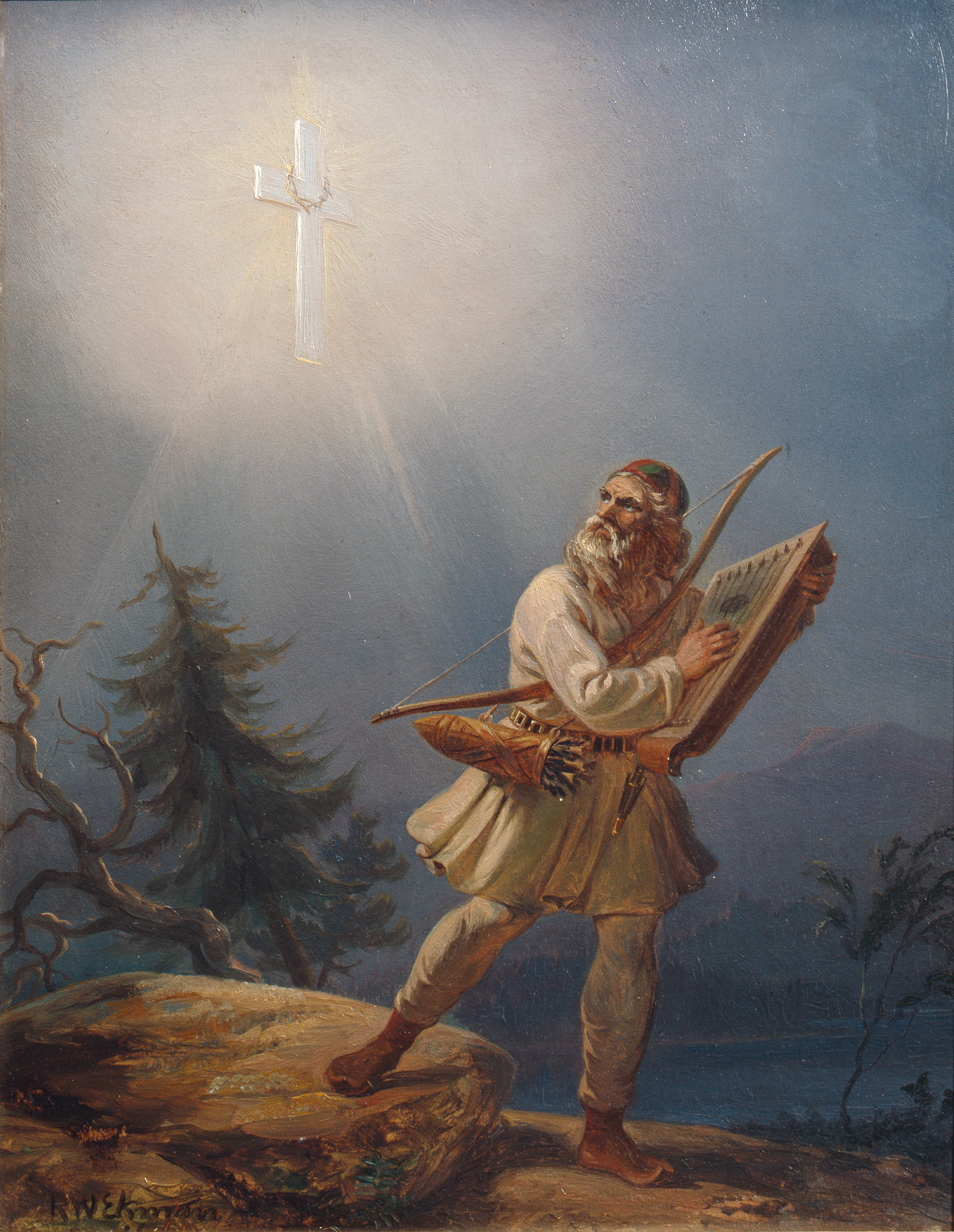
Fleeing Paganism, Robert Wilhelm Ekman, 1860

== See also ==
- Finnish mythology
- List of Kalevala translations
